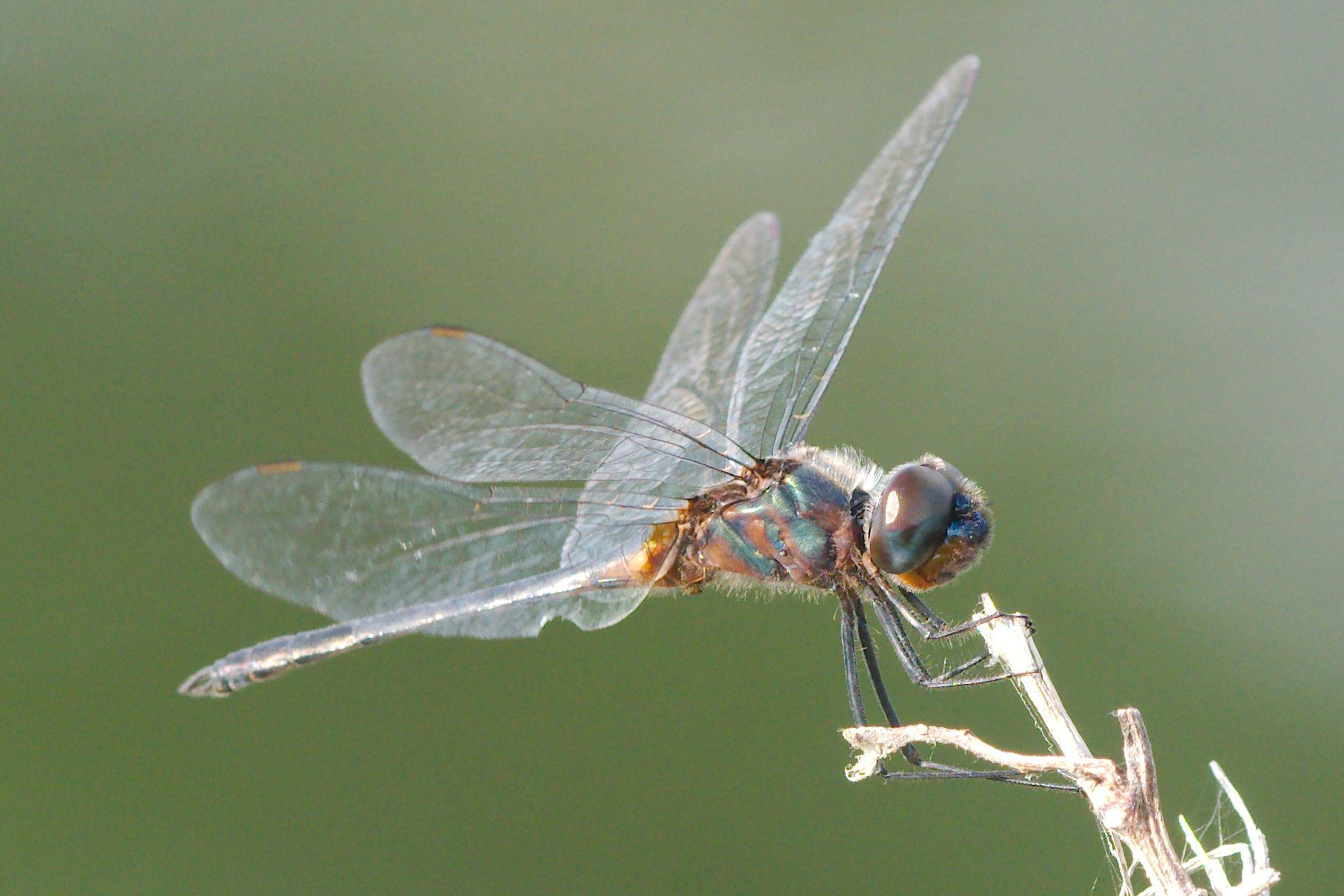

Conservation status
- Least Concern (IUCN 3.1)

Scientific classification
- Kingdom: Animalia
- Phylum: Arthropoda
- Class: Insecta
- Order: Odonata
- Infraorder: Anisoptera
- Family: Libellulidae
- Genus: Idiataphe
- Species: I. cubensis

Binomial name
- Idiataphe cubensis (Scudder, 1866)

= Idiataphe cubensis =

Species of dragonfly

Idiataphe cubensis, the metallic pennant, is a species of skimmer in the dragonfly family Libellulidae. It is found in the Caribbean, Central America, North America, and South America.

The IUCN conservation status of Idiataphe cubensis is "LC", least concern, with no immediate threat to the species' survival. The population is stable. The IUCN status was reviewed in 2017.
