= Cyanothemis =

Conservation status
- Least Concern (IUCN 3.1)

Scientific classification
- Kingdom: Animalia
- Phylum: Arthropoda
- Class: Insecta
- Order: Odonata
- Infraorder: Anisoptera
- Family: Libellulidae
- Genus: Cyanothemis; Ris, 1915
- Species: C. simpsoni

Binomial name
- Cyanothemis simpsoni Ris, 1915

Genus of dragonfly insects commonly known as bluebolt

Cyanothemis is a monotypic genus of dragonflies in the family Libellulidae containing the single species Cyanothemis simpsoni. It is known by the common name bluebolt. It is native to central Africa, where it is known from Cameroon, the Democratic Republic of the Congo, Côte d'Ivoire, Ghana, Guinea, Liberia, Nigeria and Sierra Leone.

This dragonfly lives along rivers in forested habitat.
