= Malgassophlebia bispina =

Conservation status
- Least Concern (IUCN 3.1)

Scientific classification
- Kingdom: Animalia
- Phylum: Arthropoda
- Clade: Pancrustacea
- Class: Insecta
- Order: Odonata
- Infraorder: Anisoptera
- Family: Libellulidae
- Genus: Malgassophlebia
- Species: M. bispina

Binomial name
- Malgassophlebia bispina Fraser, 1958

Species of dragonfly

Malgassophlebia bispina, the ringed leaftipper, is a species of dragonfly in the family Libellulidae. It is found in the Democratic Republic of the Congo, Guinea, Liberia, Nigeria, Uganda, and Zambia. Its natural habitat is subtropical or tropical moist lowland forests.
