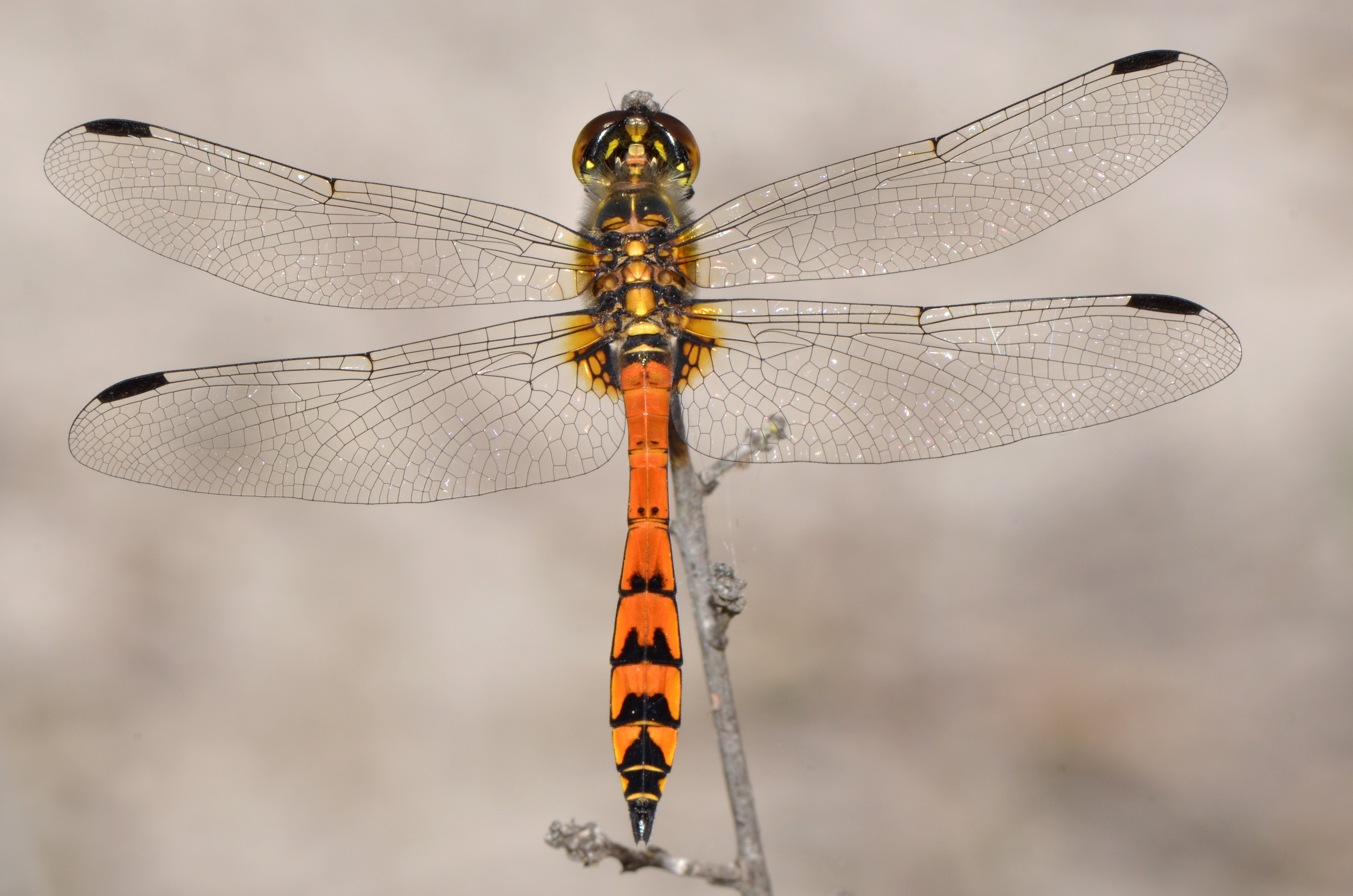

Conservation status
- Least Concern (IUCN 3.1)

Scientific classification
- Kingdom: Animalia
- Phylum: Arthropoda
- Clade: Pancrustacea
- Class: Insecta
- Order: Odonata
- Suborder: Anisoptera
- Superfamily: Libelluloidea
- Family: Libellulidae
- Genus: Austrothemis; Ris, 1912
- Species: A. nigrescens

Binomial name
- Austrothemis nigrescens Martin, 1901

= Austrothemis =

Genus of insects

Austrothemis is a genus of dragonflies in the family Libellulidae, endemic to southern Australia. The single known species, Austrothemis nigrescens, is commonly known as the swamp flat-tail. It is endemic to southern Australia, where it inhabits lakes and swamps. It is a small dragonfly; the male has a flattened abdomen with black and red markings, and the female has black and yellow markings.

== Etymology ==
The genus name Austrothemis combines the prefix austro- (from Latin auster, meaning “south wind”, hence “southern”) with -themis, from the Greek Θέμις (Themis), the goddess of divine law, order and justice. In early odonate taxonomy, names ending in -themis were introduced by Hagen and were widely used for dragonflies in the family Libellulidae.

The species name nigrescens is derived from the Latin nigresco ("to become black"), referring to the dark colouring of much of the thorax and the markings on the abdomen.

== Gallery ==
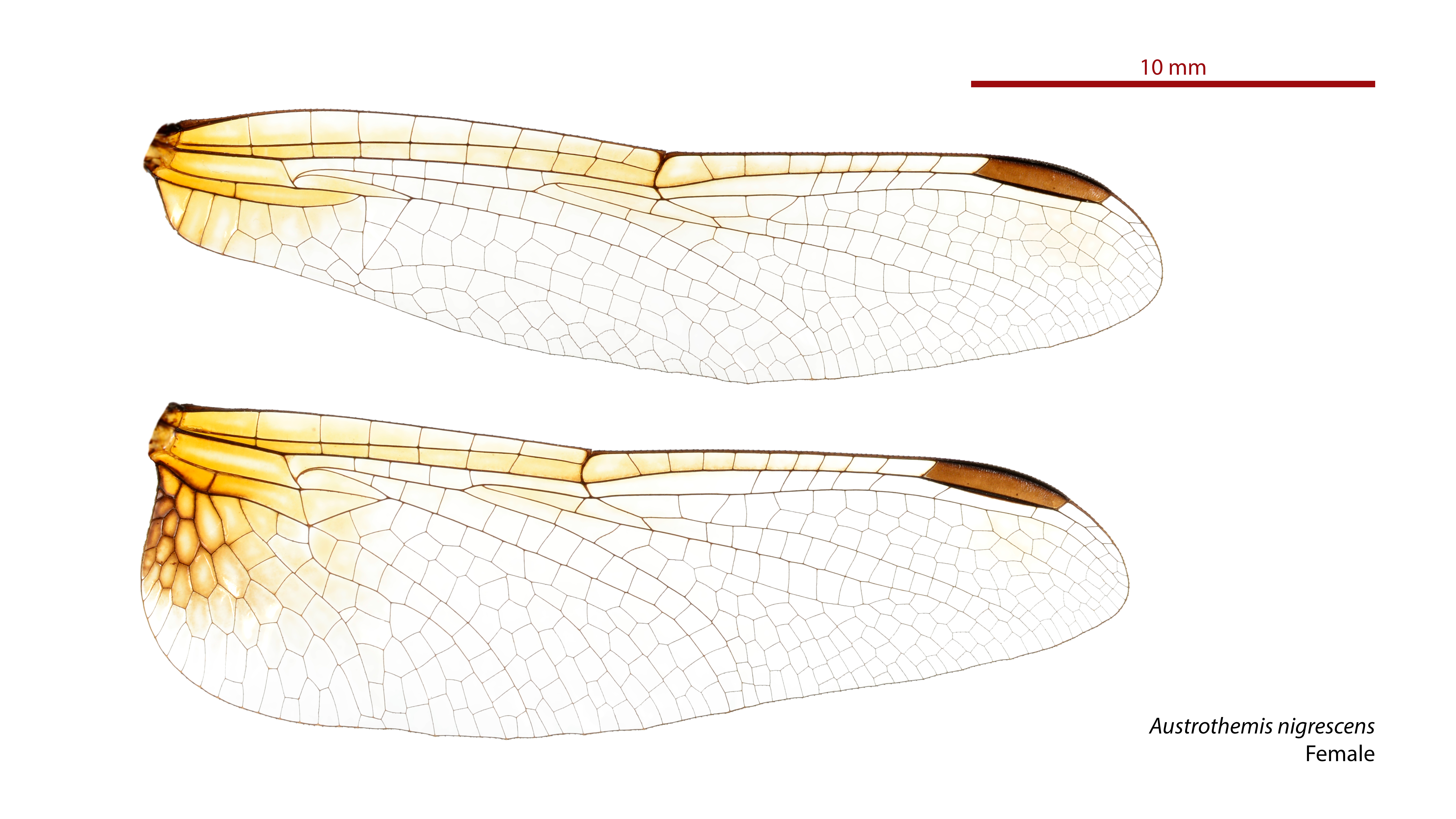
Photo of female wings

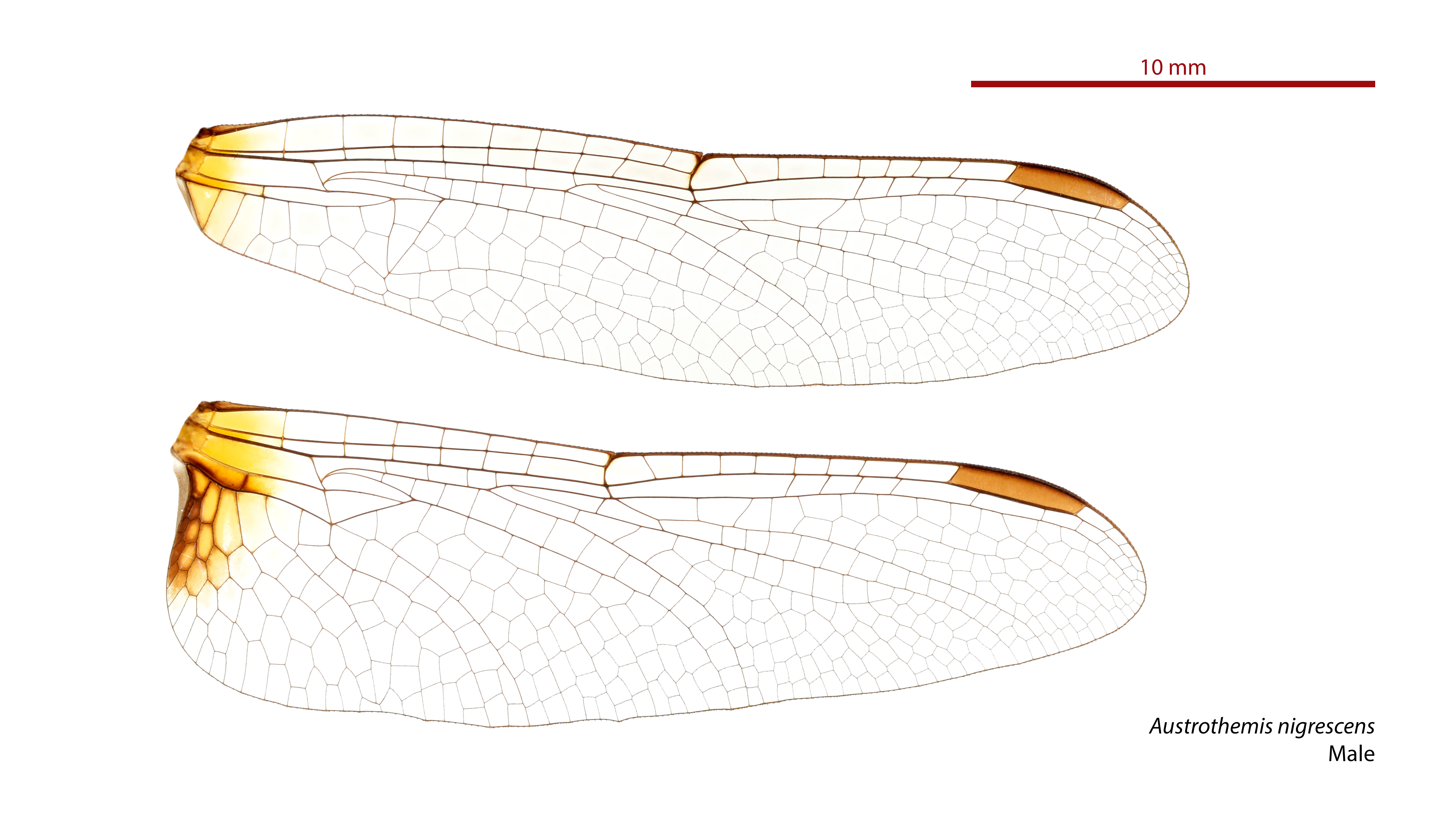
Photo of male wings

== See also ==
- List of Odonata species of Australia
