= Thermochoria equivocata =

Conservation status
- Least Concern (IUCN 3.1)

Scientific classification
- Kingdom: Animalia
- Phylum: Arthropoda
- Class: Insecta
- Order: Odonata
- Infraorder: Anisoptera
- Family: Libellulidae
- Genus: Thermochoria
- Species: T. equivocata

Binomial name
- Thermochoria equivocata Kirby, 1889

Species of dragonfly

Thermochoria equivocata is a species of dragonfly in the family Libellulidae. It is found in Benin, Cameroon, the Democratic Republic of the Congo, Ivory Coast, Equatorial Guinea, Gabon, Ghana, Guinea, Liberia, Malawi, Mozambique, Nigeria, Sierra Leone, Uganda, Zambia, and possibly Tanzania. Its natural habitat is subtropical or tropical moist lowland forests.
