= Oxythemis =

Conservation status
- Least Concern (IUCN 3.1)

Scientific classification
- Kingdom: Animalia
- Phylum: Arthropoda
- Class: Insecta
- Order: Odonata
- Infraorder: Anisoptera
- Family: Libellulidae
- Genus: Oxythemis
- Species: O. phoenicosceles

Binomial name
- Oxythemis phoenicosceles Ris, 1910

Species of dragonfly

Oxythemis phoenicosceles, the Pepperpants, is a species of dragonfly in the family Libellulidae. It is found in Benin, Cameroon, the Republic of the Congo, the Democratic Republic of the Congo, Ivory Coast, Gabon, Gambia, Ghana, Liberia, Nigeria, and Uganda. Its natural habitats are subtropical or tropical moist lowland forests, shrub-dominated wetlands, and freshwater marshes.

It is the only species in its genus.
