= Thermochoria jeanneli =

Conservation status
- Least Concern (IUCN 3.1)

Scientific classification
- Kingdom: Animalia
- Phylum: Arthropoda
- Class: Insecta
- Order: Odonata
- Infraorder: Anisoptera
- Family: Libellulidae
- Genus: Thermochoria
- Species: T. jeanneli

Binomial name
- Thermochoria jeanneli (Martin, 1915)

Species of dragonfly

Thermochoria jeanneli is a species of dragonfly in the family Libellulidae. It is found in Kenya, Malawi, Tanzania, and Zambia. Its natural habitats are subtropical or tropical moist lowland forests, shrub-dominated wetlands, and freshwater marshes. It is threatened by habitat loss.
