= Trithetrum =

Scientific classification
- Kingdom: Animalia
- Phylum: Arthropoda
- Class: Insecta
- Order: Odonata
- Infraorder: Anisoptera
- Family: Libellulidae
- Genus: Trithetrum; Dijkstra & Pilgrim, 2007

Genus of dragonflies

Trithetrum is a genus of dragonflies in the family Libellulidae. It contains only two species:

- Trithetrum congoense (Aguesse, 1966)
- Trithetrum navasi (Lacroix, 1921) - Navas' Darter
