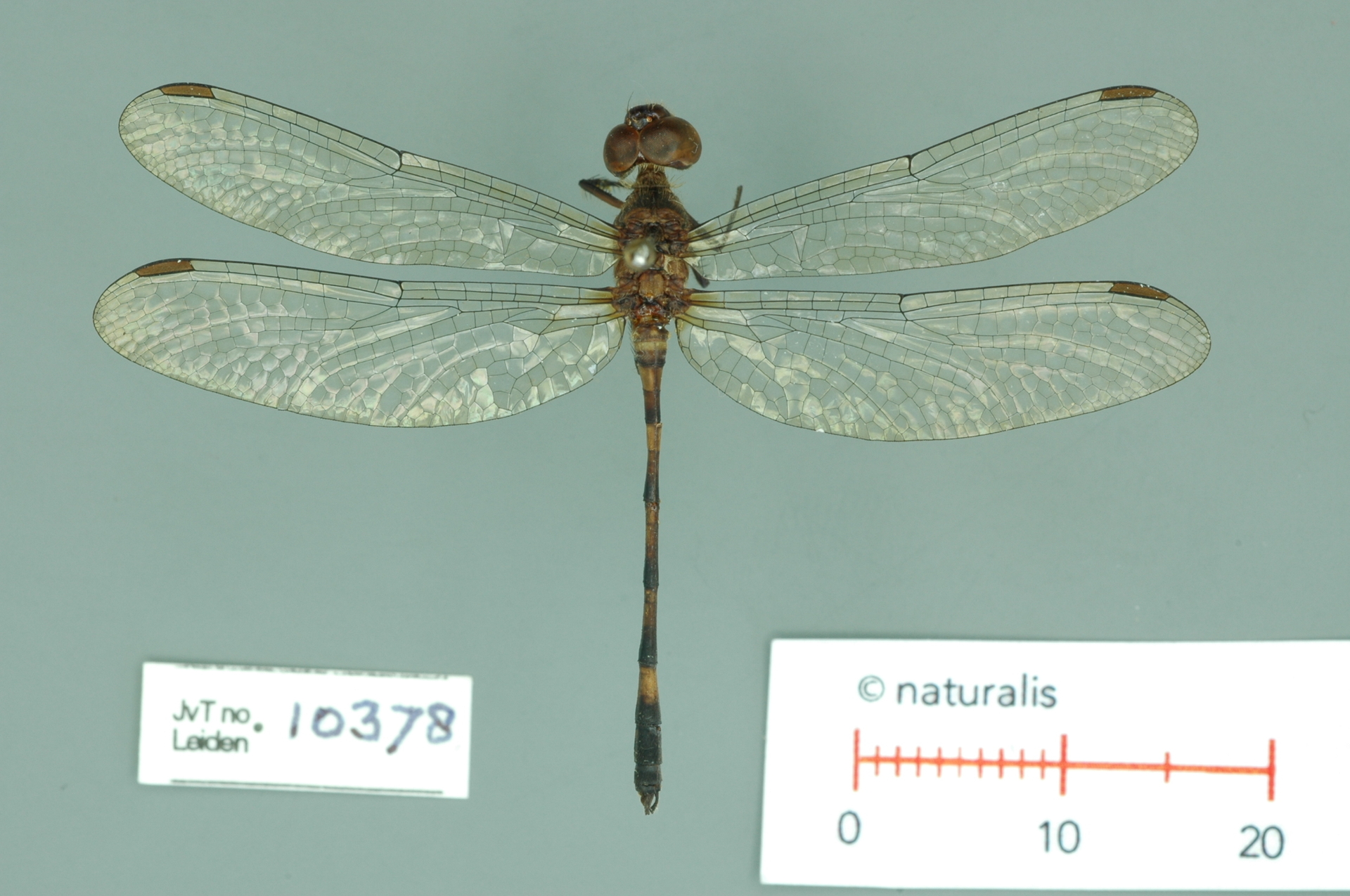

Conservation status
- Data Deficient (IUCN 3.1)

Scientific classification
- Kingdom: Animalia
- Phylum: Arthropoda
- Class: Insecta
- Order: Odonata
- Infraorder: Anisoptera
- Family: Libellulidae
- Genus: Nothodiplax
- Species: N. dendrophila

Binomial name
- Nothodiplax dendrophila Belle, 1984

= Nothodiplax =

Genus of dragonflies

Nothodiplax is a genus of dragonfly in the family Libellulidae. It contains only one species, Nothodiplax dendrophila, known as the canopy skimmer.

It is endemic to Suriname. Its natural habitat is gallery forest with adults occasionally flying down to low bank vegetation of sand-bottomed streams.
