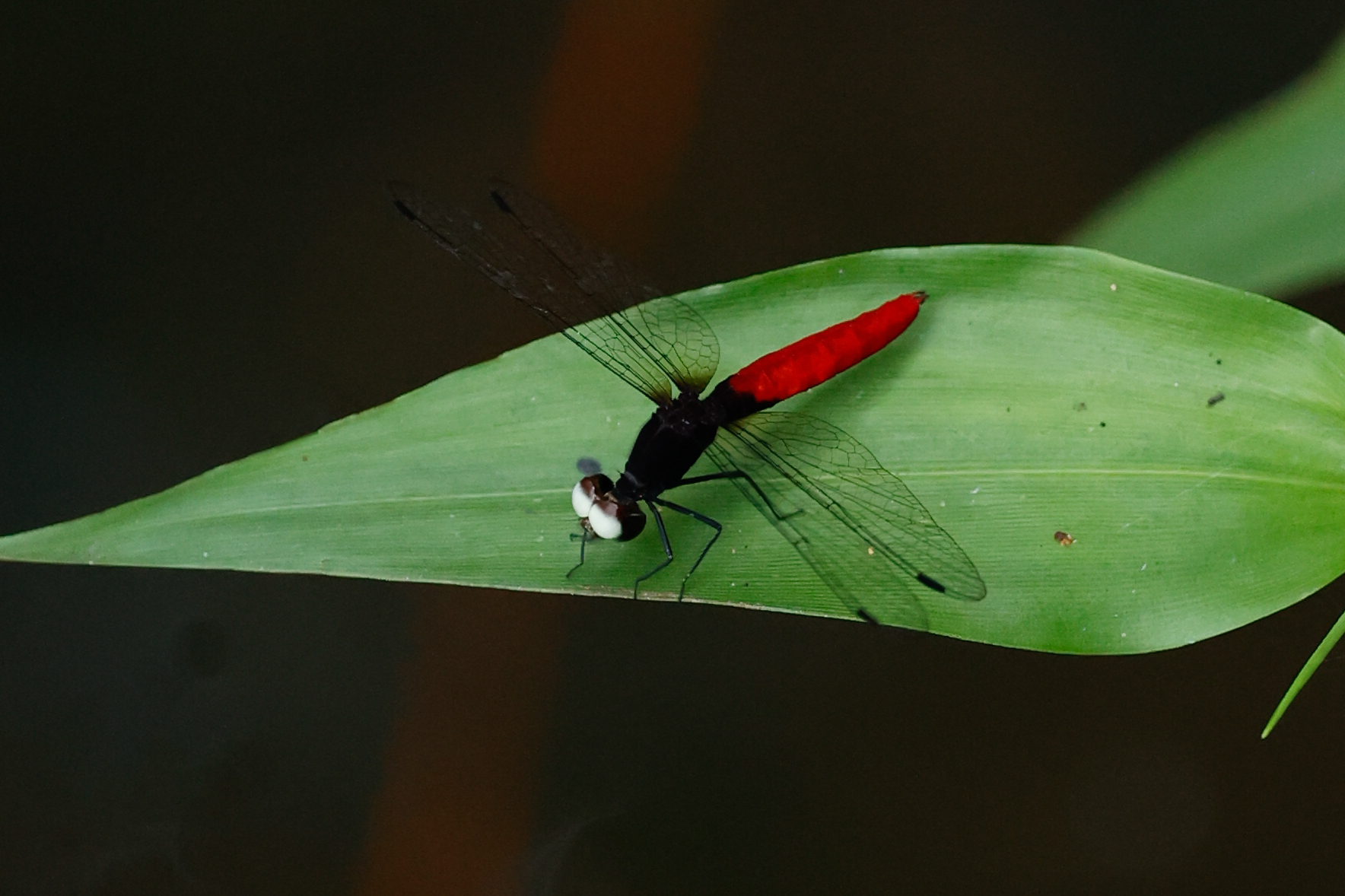
- Male in Ecuador
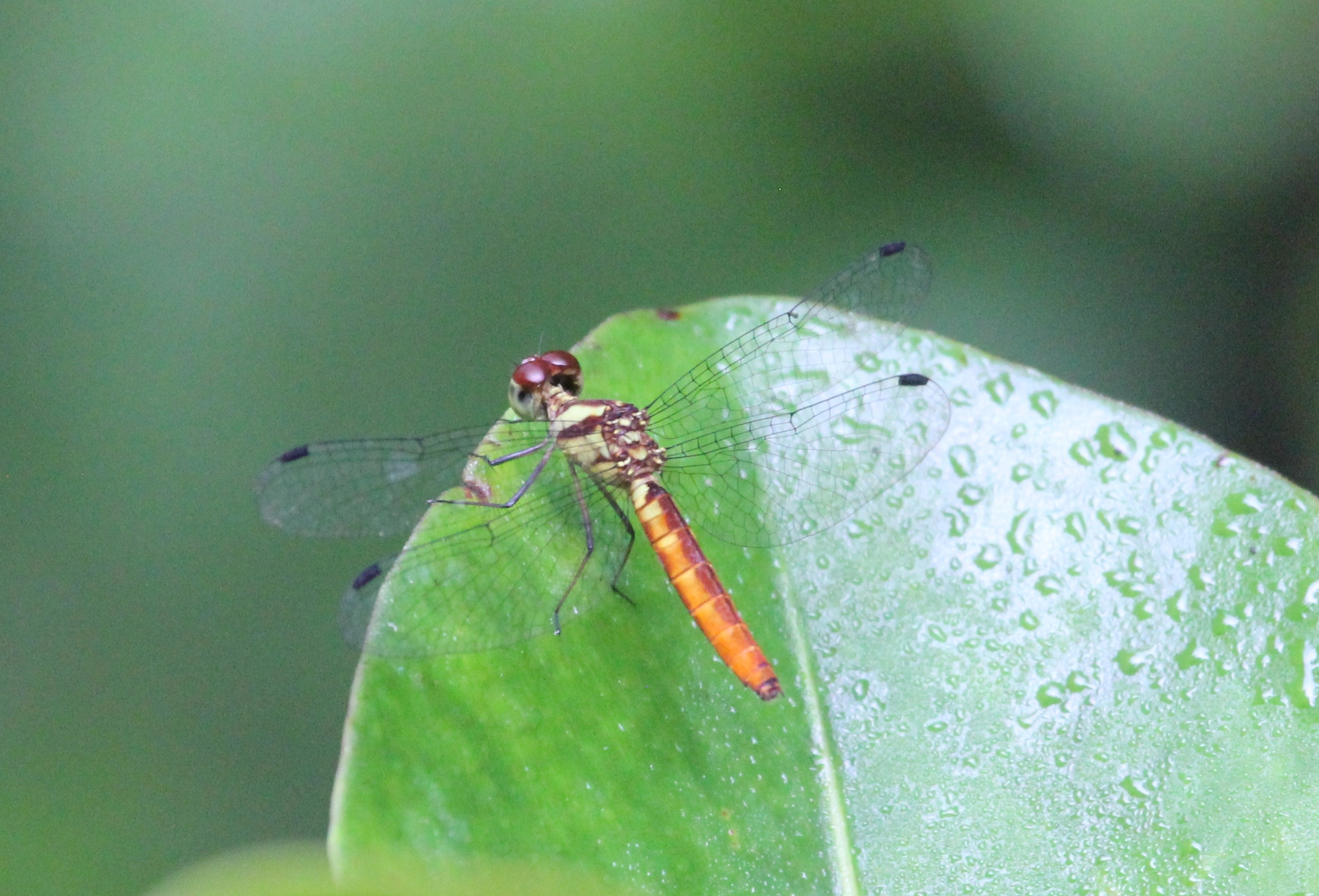
- Female in Colombia

Conservation status
- Least Concern (IUCN 3.1)

Scientific classification
- Kingdom: Animalia
- Phylum: Arthropoda
- Clade: Pancrustacea
- Class: Insecta
- Order: Odonata
- Infraorder: Anisoptera
- Superfamily: Libelluloidea
- Family: Libellulidae
- Genus: Fylgia; Kirby, 1889
- Species: F. amazonica

Binomial name
- Fylgia amazonica Kirby, 1889

= Fylgia amazonica =

Species of dragonfly

Fylgia amazonica is a species of dragonfly in the family Libellulidae. It is the only species in the genus Fylgia. It is a deep forest species, breeding in stagnant pools. It occurs in Latin America from Venezuela to northern Brazil.
