= Akrothemis =

Scientific classification
- Kingdom: Animalia
- Phylum: Arthropoda
- Clade: Pancrustacea
- Class: Insecta
- Order: Odonata
- Infraorder: Anisoptera
- Superfamily: Libelluloidea
- Family: Libellulidae
- Genus: Akrothemis; Theischinger & Richards, 2012

Genus of dragonflies

Akrothemis is a genus of dragonflies in the family Libellulidae. This genus currently has two species.

== Description ==
Akrothemis are small, short-bodied, and have long legs. Their wings are clear. Their eyes meet for much of their length. Their head, thorax and abdomen have are dark with distinctive light-coloured patterns.

== Species ==
- Akrothemis bimaculata
- Akrothemis risi

== Etymology ==
The genus name "Akrothemis" is derived from the Greek "akros" meaning "pointed" and the suffix "-themis", a commonly used suffix for closely related genera.
