= Bironides =

Scientific classification
- Kingdom: Animalia
- Phylum: Arthropoda
- Class: Insecta
- Order: Odonata
- Infraorder: Anisoptera
- Family: Libellulidae
- Genus: Bironides; Förster, 1903

Genus of dragonflies

Bironides is a genus of dragonflies within the family Libellulidae. Members of this genus are found on the island of New Guinea in both Indonesia and Papua New Guinea.

== Species ==
- Bironides glochidion Lieftinck, 1963
- Bironides liesthes Lieftinck, 1937
- Bironides superstes Förster, 1903
- Bironides teuchestes Lieftinck, 1933
- Bironides ypsilon Theischinger, Richards & Toko, 2017
