= Nesoxenia =

Scientific classification
- Kingdom: Animalia
- Phylum: Arthropoda
- Class: Insecta
- Order: Odonata
- Infraorder: Anisoptera
- Superfamily: Libelluloidea
- Family: Libellulidae
- Genus: Nesoxenia; Kirby, 1889

Genus of dragonflies

External image
- Images at iNaturalist

Nesoxenia is a genus of dragonflies in the family Libellulidae, erected by William Forsell Kirby in 1889. Species have been recorded from Indochina and Malesia through to New Guinea.

== Species ==
The Global Biodiversity Information Facility lists:

1. Nesoxenia lineata (Selys, 1879)
2. Nesoxenia mysis (Selys, 1878)
