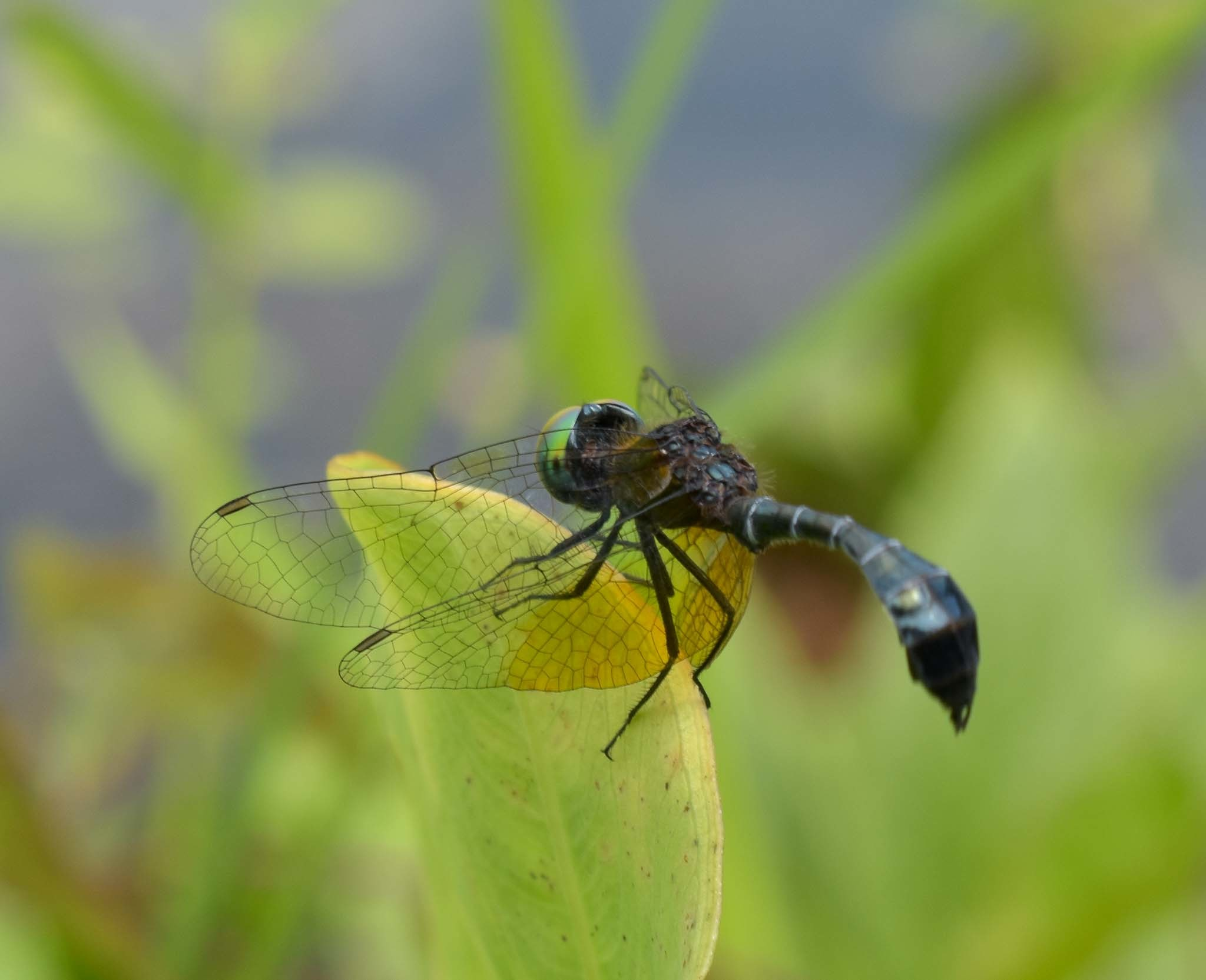
- Nannophyopsis clara

Scientific classification
- Kingdom: Animalia
- Phylum: Arthropoda
- Clade: Pancrustacea
- Class: Insecta
- Order: Odonata
- Infraorder: Anisoptera
- Family: Libellulidae
- Genus: Nannophyopsis; Lieftinck, 1935

Type species
- Nannophyopsis chalcosoma Lieftinck, 1935

Species
- See text

= Nannophyopsis =

Genus of dragonflies

Nannophyopsis is a genus of small-sized dragonflies in the skimmer family Libellulidae. First described by Maurits Lieftinck in 1935, it consists of two species found throughout the Indomalayan biogeographical realm.

The type species for the genus, Nannophyopsis chalcosoma, holds the title of being the smallest dragonfly species, with a wingspan that is a bit smaller than the more commonly known Nannophya pygmaea of Japan.

== Species ==
There are two species in the genus Nannophyopsis, they are as follows:

- Nannophyopsis chalcosoma Lieftinck, 1935
- Nannophyopsis clara (Needham, 1930) – Emerald Dwarf

== Distribution ==
Nannophyopsis chalcosoma is listed by Lieftinck as being found in Biliton Island, now known as Belitung. There are additional sightings on the island of Borneo.

Nannophyopsis clara was first discovered in China, with additional records in: India, Malaysia (Sarawak), Taiwan, Thailand, and Vietnam. With an additional single sighting known from Japan.
