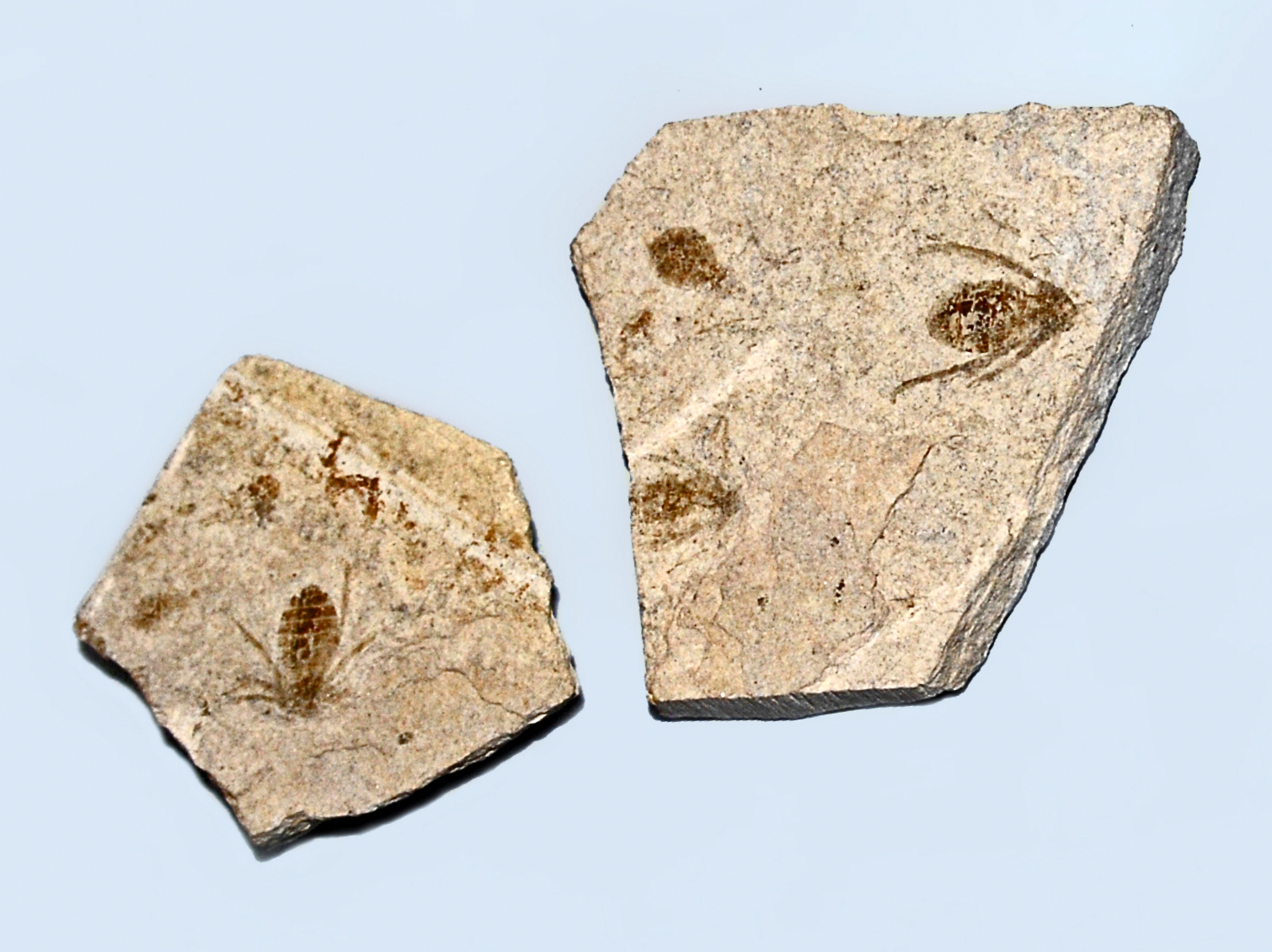
- Fossil larvae of Oryctodiplax gypsorum from Italy

Scientific classification
- Kingdom: Animalia
- Phylum: Arthropoda
- Clade: Pancrustacea
- Class: Insecta
- Order: Odonata
- Infraorder: Anisoptera
- Family: Libellulidae
- Genus: †Oryctodiplax; Cavallo & Galletti, 1987

Type species
- Oryctodiplax gypsorum Cavallo & Galletti, 1987

= Oryctodiplax =

Oryctodiplax Temporal range: Miocene

Extinct genus of dragonflies

Oryctodiplax is an extinct genus of dragonfly in the family Libellulidae.

Fossils (mainly larvae) of these dragonflies have been found in the Miocene of Italy (age range: from 7.246 to 5.332 million years ago).

The type species is Oryctodiplax gypsorum. It was a species resistant to a highly saline environment, formed in the Mediterranean salinity crisis, occurred during the latest stage of the Miocene, with the isolation of the Mediterranean sea and its subsequent drying.
