= Malgassophlebia =

Scientific classification
- Kingdom: Animalia
- Phylum: Arthropoda
- Clade: Pancrustacea
- Class: Insecta
- Order: Odonata
- Infraorder: Anisoptera
- Family: Libellulidae
- Subfamily: Tetrathemistinae
- Genus: Malgassophlebia; Fraser, 1956

Genus of dragonflies

Malgassophlebia, sometimes called leaftippers, is a genus of dragonfly in the family Libellulidae. It contains the following species:

- Malgassophlebia bispina Fraser, 1958 - ringed leaftipper
- Malgassophlebia mayanga (Ris, 1909)
- Malgassophlebia mediodentata Legrand, 2001
- Malgassophlebia westfalli Legrand, 1986 - dark leaftipper
