= Zygonychidium =

Conservation status
- Critically Endangered (IUCN 3.1)

Scientific classification
- Kingdom: Animalia
- Phylum: Arthropoda
- Class: Insecta
- Order: Odonata
- Infraorder: Anisoptera
- Family: Libellulidae
- Genus: Zygonychidium; Lindley, 1970
- Species: Z. gracile

Binomial name
- Zygonychidium gracile Lindley, 1970

Species of dragonfly

Zygonychidium gracile is a species of dragonfly in the family Libellulidae. It is the only species in the genus Zygonychidium.

Zygonychidium gracile has only been found on a section of the Bandama River in Côte d'Ivoire. It has extremely long cerci (rear appendages) hence its common name of streamertail.
