= Thermochoria =

Scientific classification
- Kingdom: Animalia
- Phylum: Arthropoda
- Class: Insecta
- Order: Odonata
- Infraorder: Anisoptera
- Family: Libellulidae
- Genus: Thermochoria; Kirby, 1889

Genus of dragonflies

Thermochoria is a genus of dragonfly in the family Libellulidae. It contains only two species:

- Thermochoria equivocata Kirby, 1889
- Thermochoria jeanneli (Martin, 1915)
