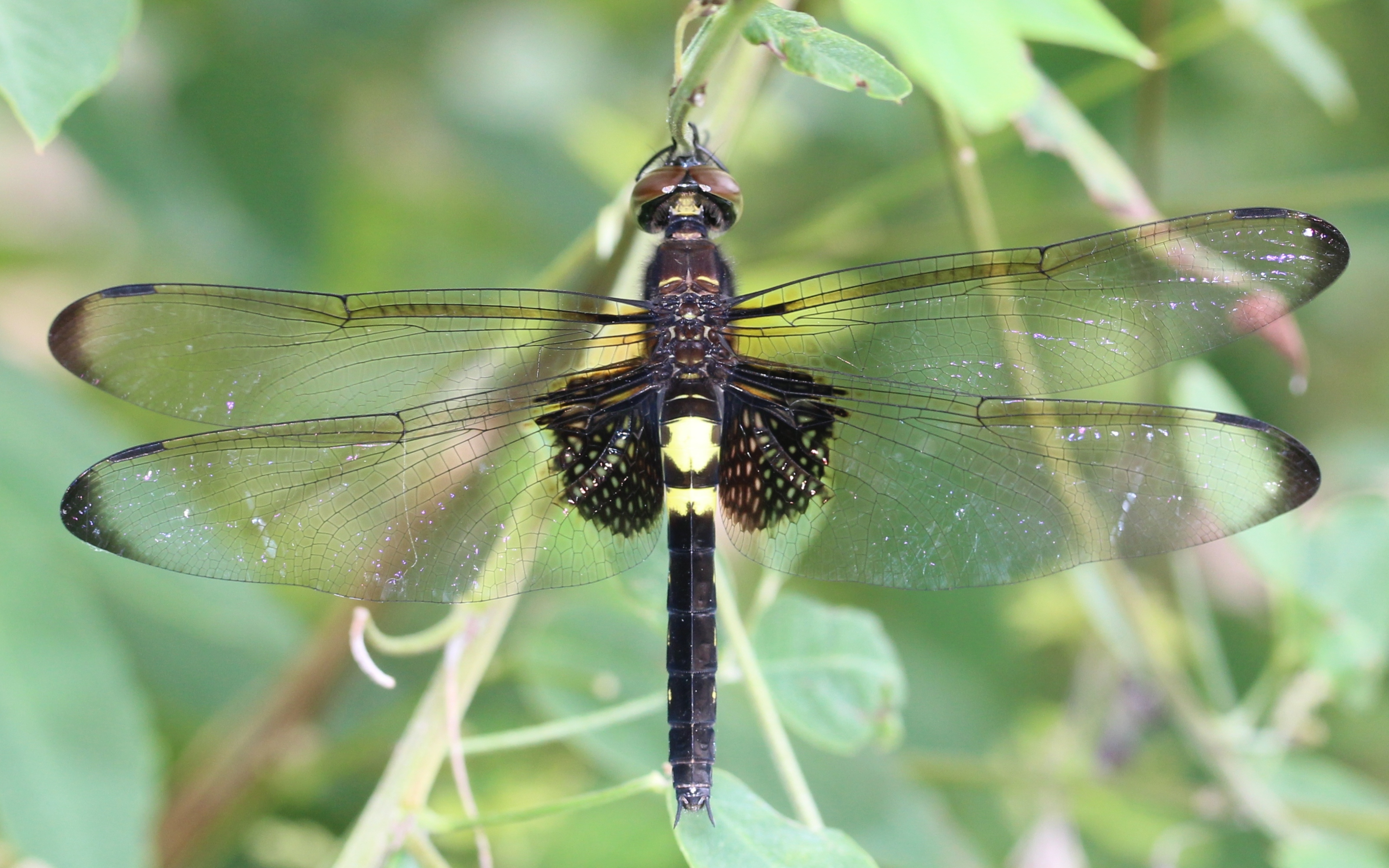
- Pseudothemis zonata

Scientific classification
- Kingdom: Animalia
- Phylum: Arthropoda
- Class: Insecta
- Order: Odonata
- Infraorder: Anisoptera
- Family: Libellulidae
- Subfamily: Trithemistinae
- Genus: Pseudothemis; Kirby, 1889

= Pseudothemis =

Genus of dragonflies

Pseudothemis is a genus of dragonflies in the family Libellulidae, erected by William Forsell Kirby in 1889. Species have been recorded from Japan, Korea, China, Indochina down to Peninsular Malaysia and Borneo.

== Species ==
The Global Biodiversity Information Facility lists:

Male	Female	Scientific name	Distribution
		Pseudothemis jorina Förster, 1904	Thailand, Malaysia, Cambodia
		Pseudothemis zonata (Burmeister, 1839)	China, Bangladesh, India (Nagaland), Japan, Taiwan, Thailand and Vietnam
