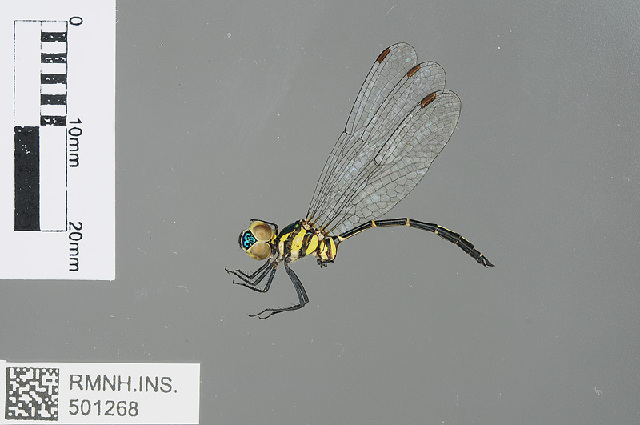
- Risiophlebia dohrni

Scientific classification
- Kingdom: Animalia
- Phylum: Arthropoda
- Class: Insecta
- Order: Odonata
- Infraorder: Anisoptera
- Family: Libellulidae
- Subfamily: Tetrathemistinae
- Genus: Risiophlebia; Cowley, 1934

Species
- Risiophlebia dohrni; Risiophlebia guentheri; Risiophlebia risi

= Risiophlebia =

Genus of insects

Risiophlebia is a genus of dragonfly in the family Libellulidae. It contains three species, all of which are endemic to the Central Highlands of the Mondulkiri Province and some other regions of southern Vietnam.

== Species ==
The genus contains three species:

- Risiophlebia dohrni
- Risiophlebia guentheri
- Risiophlebia risi

Risiophlebia guentheri is named after André Günther in honor of his contributions to the study of Odonata.

== Range and habitat ==
Deforestation and the establishment of new plantations is the biggest threat to Risiophlebia. The Nee Soon freshwater swamp, located in the Central Catchment Nature Reserve, is the only site in Singapore where R. dohrni can be found. R. dohrni is extremely rare, making them hard to find and study. R. dohrni has been documented in the Central Kalimantan province of Indonesia. R. dohrni has also been documented at the island of Belitung in Indonesia. R. guentheri was first discovered at the Central Plateau of the Annamese Mountains, and was named after André Günther as a homage to his contributions to the study of Odonata.

== Reproduction ==
Risiophlebia dohrni reproduce in freshwater and peat swamp forests. Larvae are found in freshwater where they prey on other aquatic organisms, such as tadpoles and small fish.

== Distinguishing species of Risiophlebia ==
Risiophlebia risi possess a forewing triangle that resembles the shape of a wide rhombus. In R. risi, the hindwing triangle is located at the arculus and is not recessed. The forewing triangle of R. dohrni has a normal shape and the hindwing triangle is recessed.
