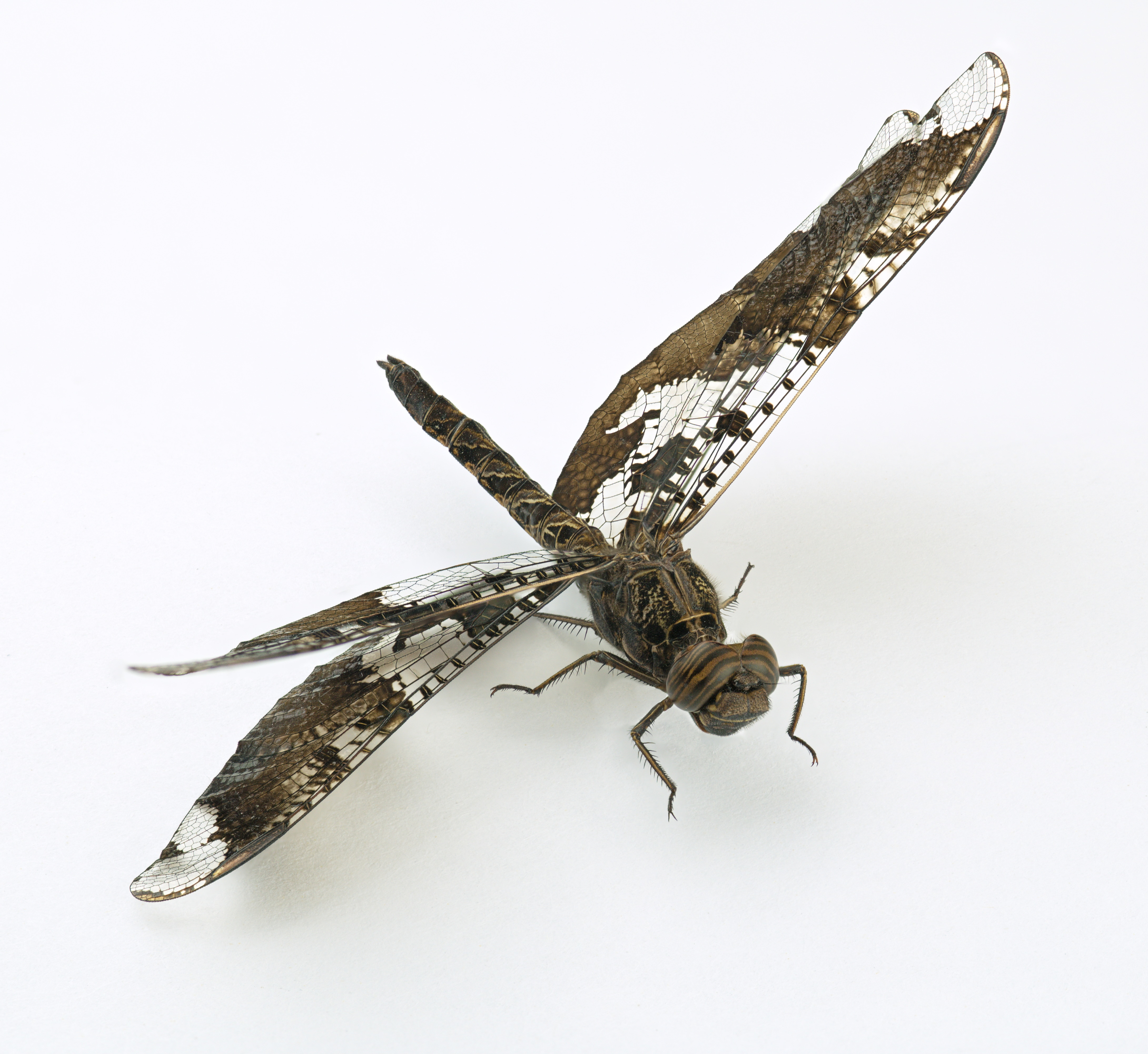
- A dead male specimen, photographed in Coacalco, Mexico

Scientific classification
- Kingdom: Animalia
- Phylum: Arthropoda
- Clade: Pancrustacea
- Class: Insecta
- Order: Odonata
- Infraorder: Anisoptera
- Family: Libellulidae
- Subfamily: Sympetrinae
- Genus: Pseudoleon; Kirby, 1889
- Species: P. superbus

Binomial name
- Pseudoleon superbus (Hagen, 1861)

Synonyms
- Celithemis superba Hagen, 1861

= Pseudoleon =

Genus of insects

Pseudoleon superbus, commonly known as the filigree skimmer, is a species of dragonfly in the family Libellulidae. It is distributed across parts of North America and is noted for its wing patterning. It is the only species in the genus Pseudoleon.

== Taxonomy ==
P. superbus belongs to the order Odonata. Within the family Libellulidae, it is placed in the genus Pseudoleon, of which it is the sole species. It was described in 1861 by Hermann August Hagen (also classified as Celithemis superba), and later by William Forsell Kirby in 1889.

== Description ==
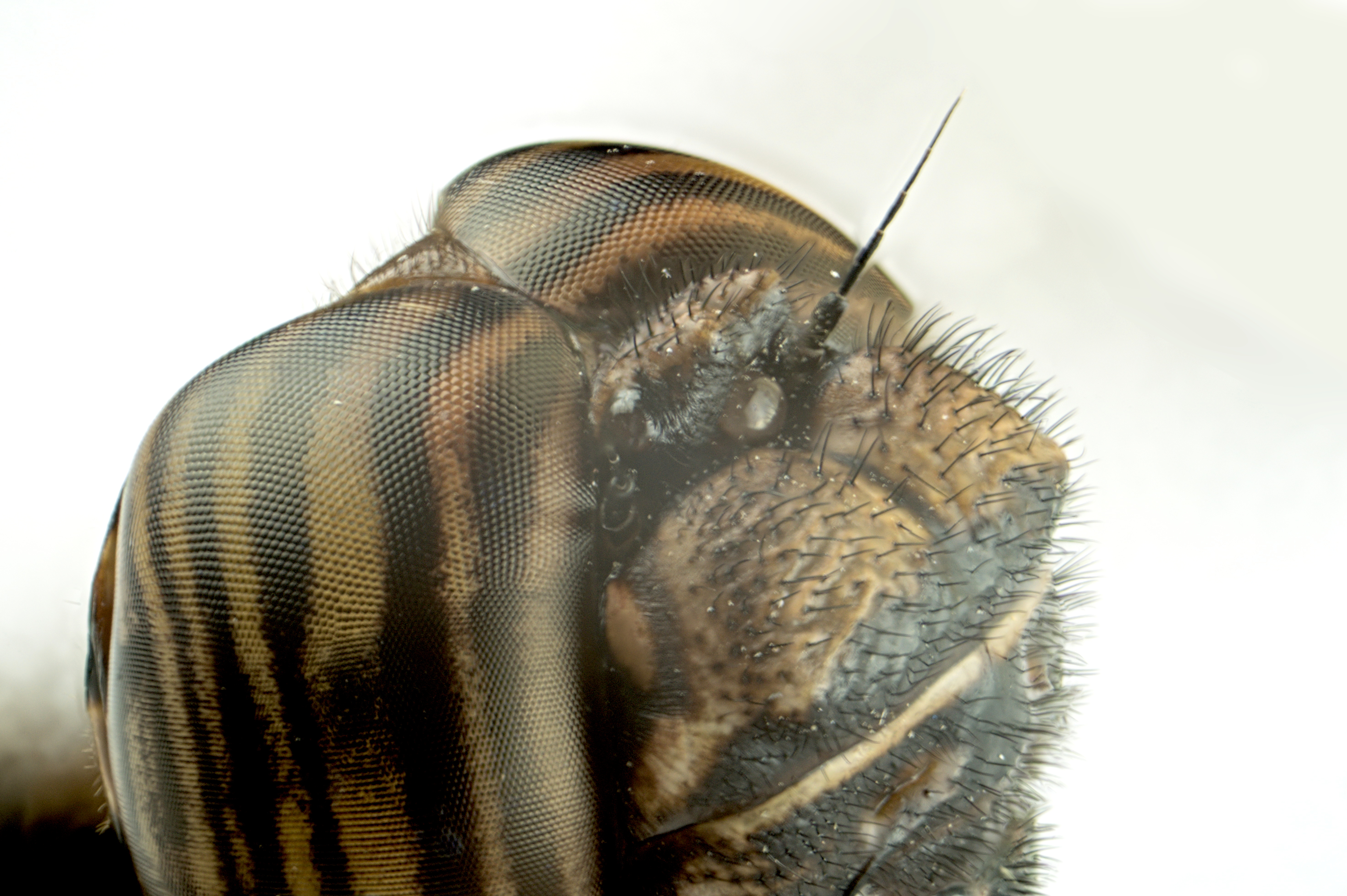
Head detail

Adults are typically between 34 millimeters (1.3 in) and 45 millimeters (1.8 in) long, the abdomen, which commonly bears V-shaped markings, averages 21 millimeters (0.83 in) to 28 millimeters (1.1 in) in length, and the hindwing ranges between 30 millimeters (1.2 in) to 36 millimeters (1.4 in) long. The eyes are pale with dark stripes. The face, abdomen, thorax, and legs are tan when young but darken with age. The wings display dark patterns and always show a distinct dark band at the nodus. The species exhibits sexual dimorphism, as males typically develop darker wings than females upon reaching sexual maturity. The wings pattern resembles filigree, from which the common name is derived.

== Behavior and distribution ==
James G. Needham and Minter J. Westfall Jr. described the species' behavior in 1955. P. superbus is found in North America, distributing from Southwestern United States to Costa Rica, and inhabits on ponds and streams. While males exhibit territorial behavior, including midair fights with rivals, females are usually found near grass and pounds. Females oviposit directly into the water or onto submerged vegetation, but they are often interrupted by males, causing the females to flee away.
