= Atratothemis =

Conservation status
- Data Deficient (IUCN 3.1)

Scientific classification
- Kingdom: Animalia
- Phylum: Arthropoda
- Class: Insecta
- Order: Odonata
- Infraorder: Anisoptera
- Family: Libellulidae
- Genus: Atratothemis; Wilson, 2005
- Species: A. reelsi

Binomial name
- Atratothemis reelsi Wilson, 2005

Genus of dragonflies

Atratothemis is a monotypic genus of dragonflies in the family Libellulidae. It contains the single species Atratothemis reelsi, which is recently described and has been observed in China and Laos. Little is known about the species so far, but it has been noted in lowland and submontane forest habitat near pools of water.

The name Atratothemis means "Themis dressed in black". The wings are narrow and pointed, and the abdomen is shorter than the wingspan. It resembles the darker-colored dragonflies of the genus Rhyothemis, which are bee mimics. In general it is blackish with a reddish tinge.
