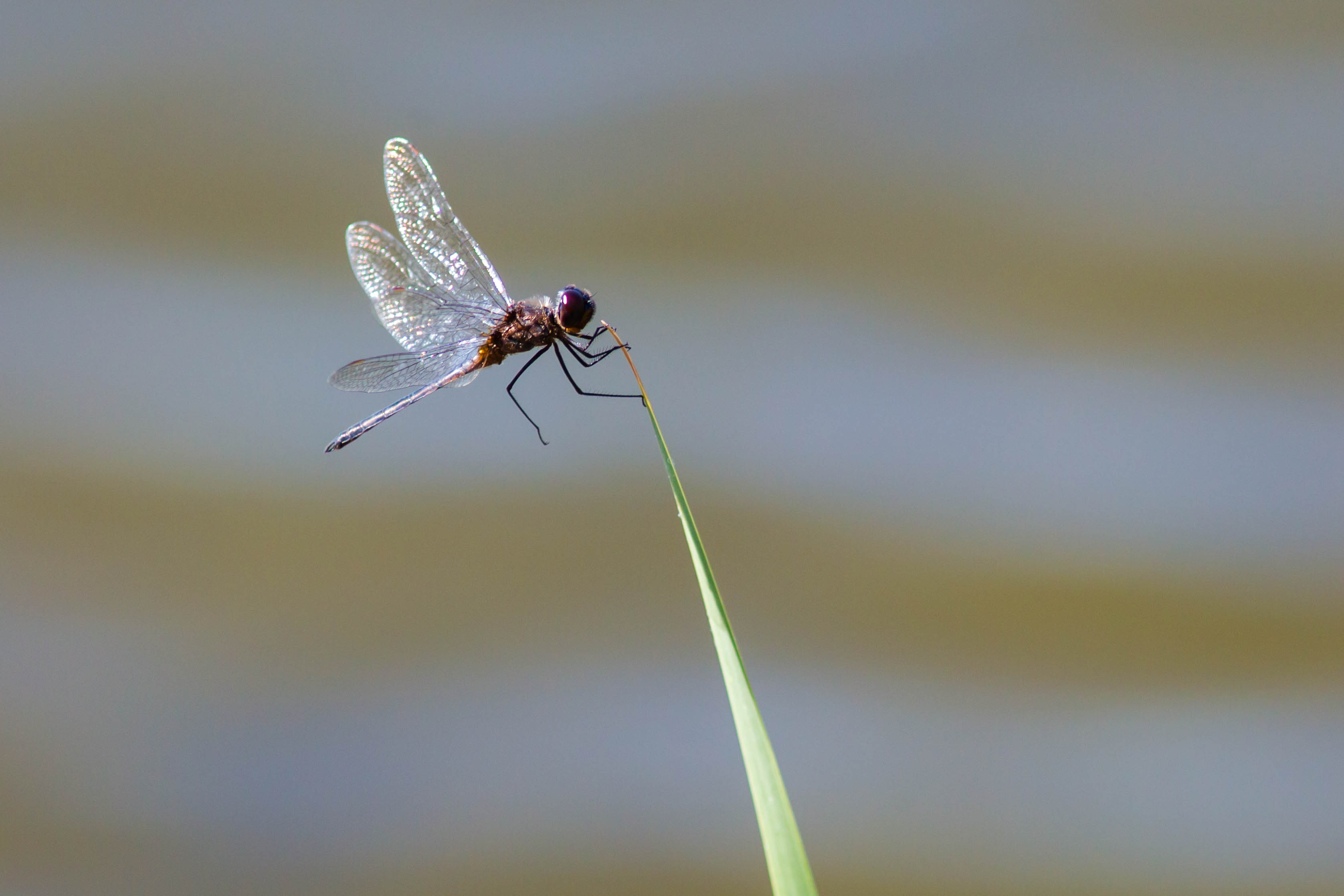

Scientific classification
- Kingdom: Animalia
- Phylum: Arthropoda
- Clade: Pancrustacea
- Class: Insecta
- Order: Odonata
- Infraorder: Anisoptera
- Family: Libellulidae
- Subfamily: Trameinae
- Tribe: Trameini
- Genus: Idiataphe; Cowley, 1934

Type species
- Idiataphe longipes

= Idiataphe =

Genus of dragonflies

Idiataphe is a genus of dragonflies in the family Libellulidae. The species are medium-sized, 34–42 millimetres (1.3–1.7 in) long. They occur from northeastern Argentina, through Brazil and the Antilles to Florida.

The genus contains the following species:

- Idiataphe amazonica (Kirby, 1889)
- Idiataphe batesi (Ris, 1913)
- Idiataphe cubensis (Scudder, 1866) – metallic pennant
- Idiataphe longipes (Hagen, 1861)
