= Sympetrum navasi =

Conservation status
- Least Concern (IUCN 3.1)

Scientific classification
- Kingdom: Animalia
- Phylum: Arthropoda
- Class: Insecta
- Order: Odonata
- Infraorder: Anisoptera
- Family: Libellulidae
- Genus: Sympetrum
- Species: S. navasi

Binomial name
- Sympetrum navasi Lacroix, 1921

Synonyms
- Trithetrum navasi (Lacroix, 1921)

Species of dragonfly

Sympetrum navasi is a species of dragonfly in the family Libellulidae. It is found in Benin, Botswana, Ivory Coast, Gambia, Ghana, Kenya, Liberia, Malawi, Namibia, Nigeria, Sierra Leone, Uganda, Zambia, Zimbabwe, possibly Burundi, and possibly Tanzania. Its natural habitats are shrub-dominated wetlands, swamps, freshwater marshes, and intermittent freshwater marshes.
