= Friedrich Ris =

Swiss physician and entomologist

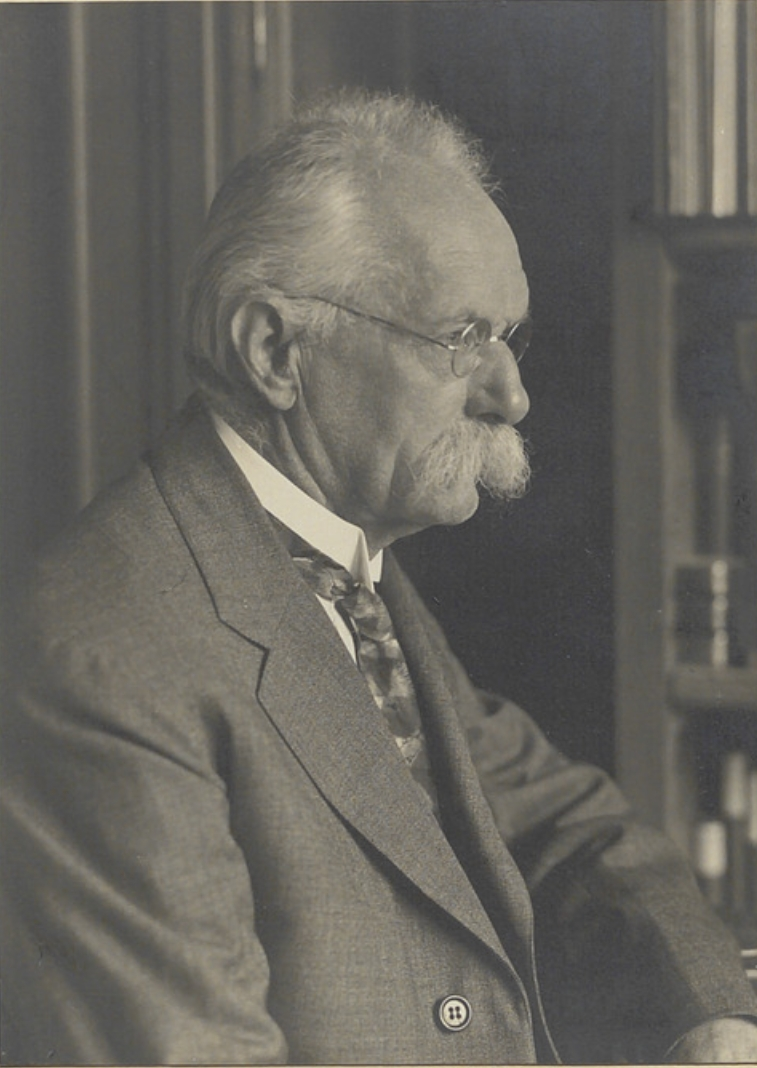
Friedrich Ris

Friedrich Ris (8 January 1867 – 30 January 1931) was a Swiss physician and entomologist who specialised in Odonata. He was Director of a psychiatric clinic in Rheinau, Switzerland.

Ris was born in Glarus, the son of merchant Frederick and Maria née Schmid. He went to school at Glarus before going to the University of Zurich and received a medical degree in 1890 with a dissertation on kidney surgery under Rudolf Ulrich Krönlein. He took an interest in entomology even as a young boy and published his first note on insects at the age of 19. After obtaining his medical degree, he worked as a ship doctor, travelling to the Americas and Asia and in 1892 moved to the University Hospital in Zurich and in 1895 he worked with the psychiatrist Eugen Bleuler in Rheinau. He also worked with Auguste Forel at Burghölz in Zurich. In his spare time he collected dragonflies and studied them. He became a director of the Rheinau canton sanatorium in 1898.

Ris described nearly 127 new species and published 100s of notes. He donated his collections to the Senckenberg Museum in Frankfurt.
