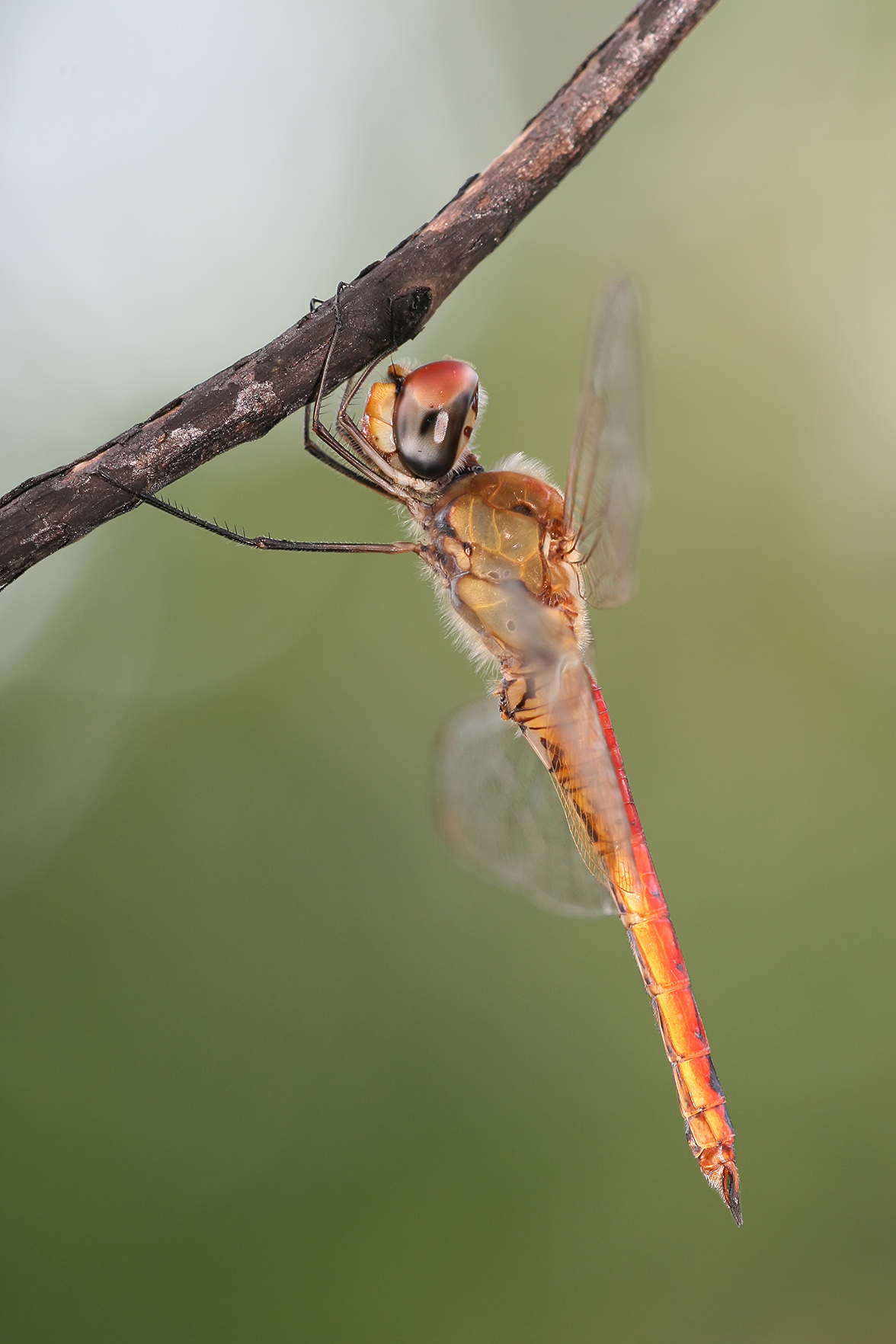
- Pantala flavescens

Scientific classification
- Kingdom: Animalia
- Phylum: Arthropoda
- Clade: Pancrustacea
- Class: Insecta
- Order: Odonata
- Suborder: Anisoptera
- Superfamily: Libelluloidea
- Family: Libellulidae; Leach, 1815
- Distribution of Libellulidae

= Libellulidae =

Libellulidae Temporal range: Turonian to present

Family of dragonflies

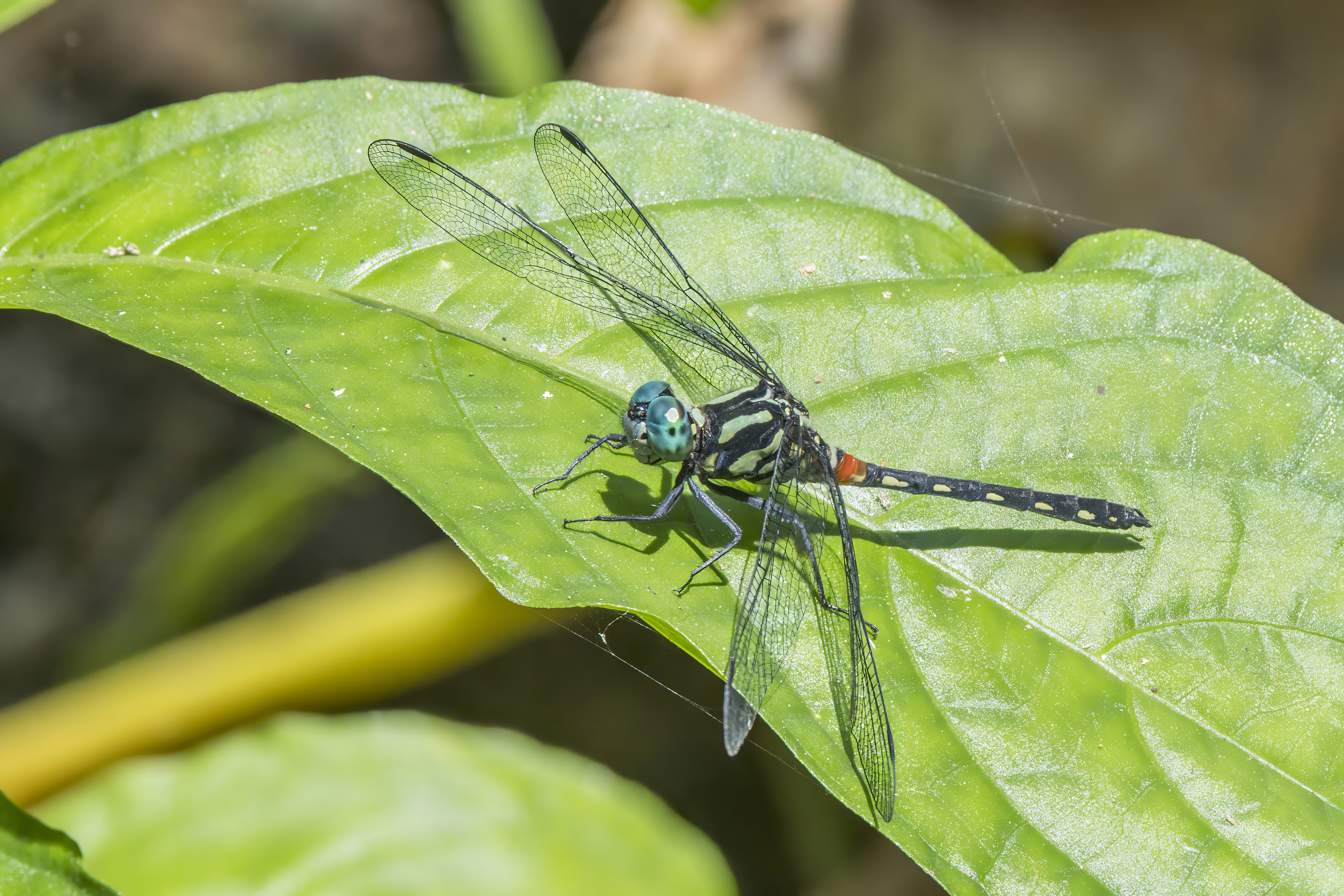
Diplacina bolivari, Luzon, Philippines

The chasers, darters, skimmers, and perchers and their relatives form the Libellulidae, the largest family of dragonflies. It is sometimes considered to contain the Corduliidae as the subfamily Corduliinae and the Macromiidae as the subfamily Macromiinae. Even if these are excluded (as Silsby does), there remains a family of over 1000 species. With nearly worldwide distribution, these are the most commonly encountered dragonflies.

The genus Libellula is mostly New World but also has one of the few endangered odonates from Japan: Libellula angelina. Many of the members of this genus are brightly colored or have banded wings. The related genus Plathemis includes the whitetails. The genus Celithemis contains several brightly marked species in the southern United States. Members of the genus Sympetrum are called darters (or meadowhawks in North America) and are found throughout most of the world, except Australia. Several tropical species in the genera Trithemis and Zenithoptera are considered to be especially beautiful. Other common genera include Tramea and Pantala.

Libellulids have stout-bodied larvae with the lower lip or labium developed into a mask over the lower part of the face.

The earliest record of the family is the fossil genus †Palaeolibellula Fleck, Nel & Martinez-Delclos, 1999 from the Turonian of Kazakhstan, which appears to represent a stem-member of the family.

== Genera ==
The following genera are currently placed in Libelluidae:

- Acisoma Rambur, 1842 – pintails
- Aeschnosoma Selys, 1871
- Aethiothemis Martin, 1908
- Aethriamanta Kirby, 1889
- Agrionoptera Brauer, 1864
- Akrothemis Theischinger & Richards, 2012
- Amphithemis Selys, 1891
- Anatya Kirby, 1889
- Antidythemis Kirby, 1889
- Antipodochlora Fraser, 1939
- Archaeophlebia Ris, 1909
- Argyrothemis Ris, 1911
- Atoconeura Karsch, 1899
- Atratothemis Wilson, 2005
- Austrothemis Ris, 1909
- Bironides Förster, 1903
- Boninthemis Asahina, 1952
- Brachydiplax Brauer, 1868
- Brachygonia Kirby, 1889
- Brachymesia Kirby, 1889 – tropical pennants
- Brachythemis Brauer, 1868
- Bradinopyga Kirby, 1894
- Brechmorhoga Kirby, 1894 – clubskimmers
- Calophlebia Selys, 1896
- Camacinia Kirby, 1889
- Cannaphila Kirby, 1889 – narrow-winged skimmers
- Carajathemis Machado, 2012
- Celebophlebia Lieftinck, 1936
- Celebothemis Ris, 1909
- Celithemis Hagen, 1861 – pennants
- Chalcostephia Kirby, 1889
- Chalybeothemis Lieftinck, 1933
- Cordulia Leach, 1815
- Corduliochlora Marinov & Seidenbusch, 2007
- Cordulisantosia Fleck & Costa, 2007
- Cratilla Kirby, 1900
- Crocothemis Brauer, 1868 – skimmers
- Cyanothemis Ris, 1915
- Dasythemis Karsch, 1889
- Deielia Kirby, 1889
- Diastatops Rambur, 1842
- Diplacina Brauer, 1868
- Diplacodes Kirby, 1889 – perchers
- Dorocordulia Needham, 1901
- Dythemis Hagen, 1861 – setwings
- Edonis Needham, 1905
- Elasmothemis Westfall, 1988
- Eleuthemis Ris, 1910
- Elga Ris, 1911
- Epitheca Charpentier, 1840
- Epithemis Laidlaw, 1955
- Erythemis Hagen, 1861 – pondhawks
- Erythrodiplax Brauer, 1868 – dragonlets
- Fylgia Kirby, 1889 - white-eyed skimmer
- Garrisonia Penalva & Costa, 2007
- Guadalca Kimmins, 1957
- Gynothemis Calvert, 1909
- Hadrothemis Karsch, 1891 – jungle-skimmers
- Helocordulia Needham, 1901
- Hemicordulia Selys, 1871
- Hemistigma Kirby, 1889 – pied-spots
- Heteronaias Needham & Gyger, 1937
- Huonia Förster, 1903
- Hydrobasileus Kirby, 1889
- Hylaeothemis Ris, 1909
- Hypothemis Karsch, 1889
- Idiataphe Cowley, 1934 – metallic pennants
- Indothemis Ris, 1909
- Ladona Needham, 1897
- Lanthanusa Ris, 1909
- Lathrecista Kirby, 1889
- Leucorrhinia Brittinger, 1850 – whitefaces
- Libellula Linnaeus, 1758 – chasers (Eng.), skimmers (Amer.)
- Libellulosoma Martin, 1907
- Lyriothemis Brauer, 1868
- Macrodiplax Brauer, 1868 – marl pennants
- Macrothemis Hagen, 1868 – sylphs
- Malgassophlebia Fraser, 1956
- Metaphya Laidlaw, 1912
- Miathyria Kirby, 1889 – dashers
- Micrathyria Kirby, 1889 – tropical dashers
- Micromacromia Karsch, 1890
- Microtrigonia Förster, 1903
- Misagria Kirby, 1889
- Nannodiplax Brauer, 1868
- Nannophlebia Selys, 1878
- Nannophya Rambur, 1842
- Nannophyopsis Lieftinck, 1935
- Nannothemis Brauer, 1868 – skimmers
- Navicordulia Machado & Costa, 1995
- Neodythemis Karsch, 1889
- Nephepeltia Kirby, 1889
- Nesciothemis Longfield, 1955
- Nesogonia Kirby, 1898
- Nesoxenia Kirby, 1889
- Neurocordulia Selys, 1871
- Neurothemis Brauer, 1867
- Nothodiplax Belle, 1984
- Notiothemis Ris, 1919 – forestwatchers
- Notolibellula Theischinger & Watson, 1977
- Oligoclada Karsch, 1890
- Olpogastra Karsch, 1895
- Onychothemis Brauer, 1868
- Orchithemis Brauer, 1878
- Orionothemis Fleck, Hamada & Carvalho, 2009
- Orthemis Hagen, 1861 – tropical king skimmers
- Orthetrum Newman, 1833 – skimmers
- Oxythemis Ris, 1910
- Pachydiplax Brauer, 1868 – blue dasher
- Pacificothemis Asahina, 1940
- Palaeothemis Fraser, 1923
- Palpopleura Rambur, 1842
- Paltothemis Karsch, 1890 – rock skimmers
- Pantala Hagen, 1861 – rainpool gliders
- Paracordulia Martin, 1906
- Parazyxomma Pinhey, 1961
- Pentathemis Karsch, 1890
- Perithemis Hagen, 1861 – amberwings
- Phyllothemis Fraser, 1935
- Planiplax Muttkowski, 1910
- Plathemis Hagen, 1861
- Pornothemis Krüger, 1902
- Porpax Karsch, 1896
- Potamarcha Karsch, 1890
- Protorthemis Kirby, 1889
- Pseudagrionoptera Ris, 1909
- Pseudoleon Kirby, 1889
- Pseudothemis Kirby, 1889
- Pseudotramea Fraser, 1920
- Raphismia Kirby, 1889
- Rhodopygia Kirby, 1889
- Rhodothemis Ris, 1909
- Rhyothemis Hagen, 1867
- Rialla Navás, 1915
- Risiophlebia Cowley, 1934
- Scapanea Kirby, 1889
- Schizocordulia Machado, 2005
- Selysiothemis Ris, 1897
- Somatochlora Selys, 1871
- Sympetrum Newman, 1833 – darters (Eng.), meadowhawks (Amer.)
- Tapeinothemis Lieftinck, 1950
- Tauriphila Kirby, 1889 – pasture gliders
- Tetrathemis Brauer, 1868
- Thalassothemis Ris, 1909
- Thermochoria Kirby, 1889
- Thermorthemis Kirby, 1889
- Tholymis Hagen, 1867 – evening skimmers
- Tramea Hagen, 1861
- Trithemis Brauer, 1868
- Trithetrum Dijkstra & Pilgrim, 2007
- Tyriobapta Kirby, 1889
- Uracis Rambur, 1842
- Urothemis Brauer, 1868
- Viridithemis Fraser, 1960
- Williamsonia Davis, 1913
- Ypirangathemis Santos, 1945
- Zenithoptera Selys, 1869
- Zygonoides Fraser, 1957
- Zygonychidium Lindley, 1970
- Zygonyx Selys in Hagen, 1867
- Zyxomma Rambur, 1842

=== Fossil genera ===
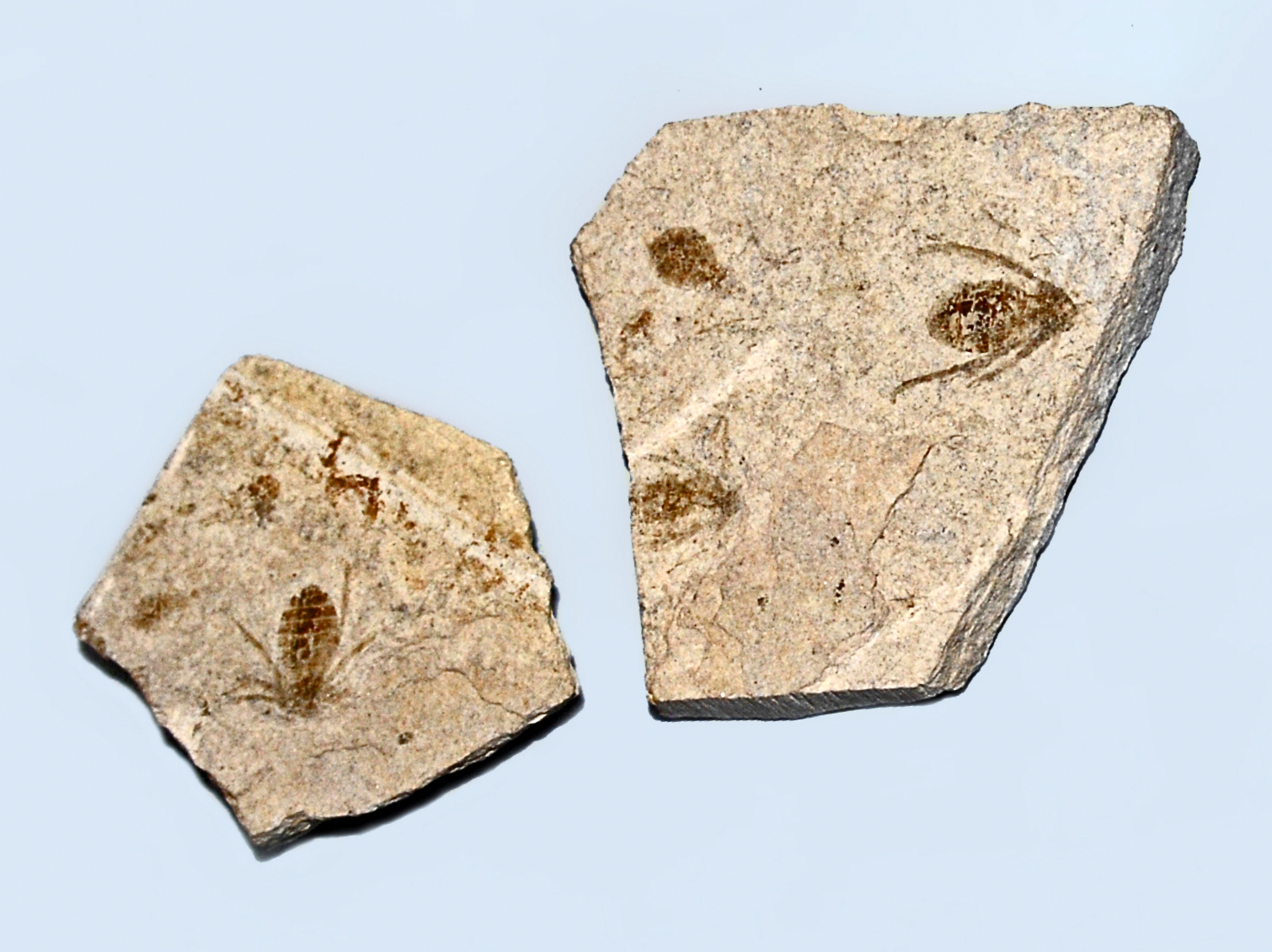
Fossil larvae of Oryctodiplax

The following fossil genera are currently assigned to Libelluidae:

- †Caussanelia Nel, Martinez-Delclós, Papier, & Oudard, 1997 (Late Oligocene of France)
- †Jeanlegrandia Nel, Petrulevicius & Jarzembowski, 2005 (Late Oligocene of France)
- †Lithemis Fraser, 1951 (mid-late Miocene of Croatia)
- †Miorhodopygia Riou & Nel, 1995 (Late Miocene of France)
- †Molertrum Zessin, 2019 (earliest Eocene of Denmark)
- †Oligocaemia Fraser, 1951 (mid-late Miocene of Croatia)
- †Oryctodiplax Cavallo & Galetti, 1987 (Late Miocene of Italy)
- †Palaeolibellula Fleck, Nel & Martinez-Delclos, 1999 (Late Cretaceous of Kazakhstan)
- †Paleotauriphila Nel & Paicheler, 1993 (Early Oligocene of France)
- †Palaeotramea Nel & Papazian, 1985 (Late Oligocene to early Miocene of France, Germany & Turkey)
- †Parabrachydiplax Bechly & Sach, 2002 (Middle Miocene of Germany)
- †Protopaltothemis Pongrácz, 1928 (Middle Miocene of Croatia)
- †Prorhyothemis Prokop, Fleck & Nel, 2003 (Early Miocene of the Czech Republic)
- †Pisaurum Gentilini, 1988 (Late Miocene of Italy)
- †Randecktrum Zessin, 2019 (early-mid Miocene of Germany)
- †Sloveniatrum Zessin, Zalohar & Hitij, 2008 (mid-late Miocene of Slovenia)
- †Trameobasileus Zeuner, 1938 (Early Miocene of Germany)

== Etymology ==
The family name Libellulidae is derived from the type genus Libellula, with the standard zoological suffix -idae used for animal families.

The genus name Libellula comes from Latin libella, meaning "a carpenter's level", because of the insect's ability to stay level when hovering.

== Gallery ==
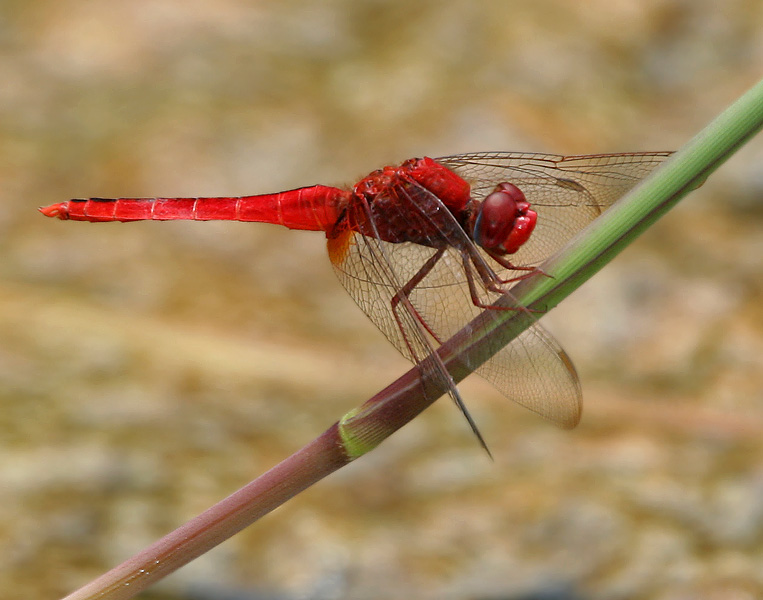
Crocothemis servilia

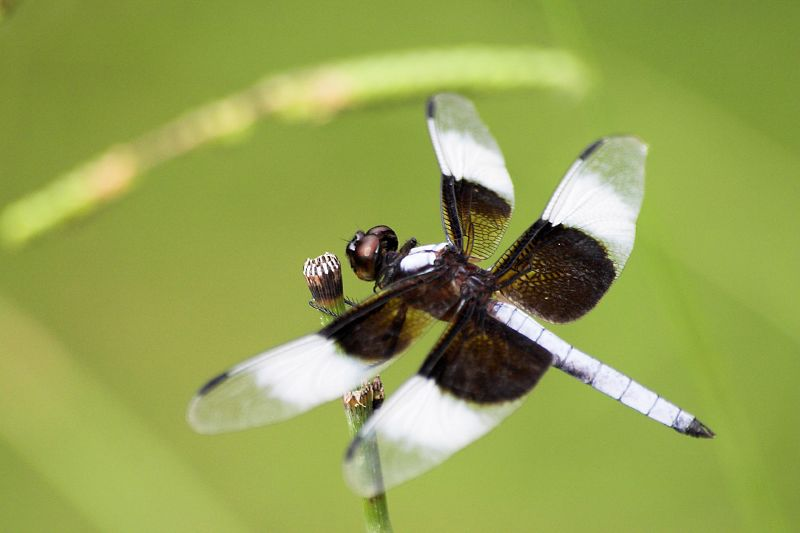
Libellula luctuosa

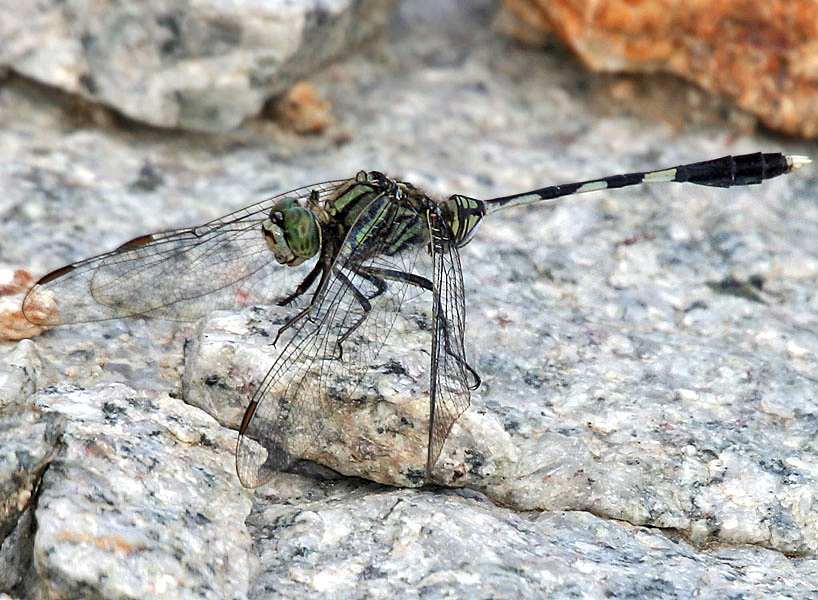
Orthetrum sabina

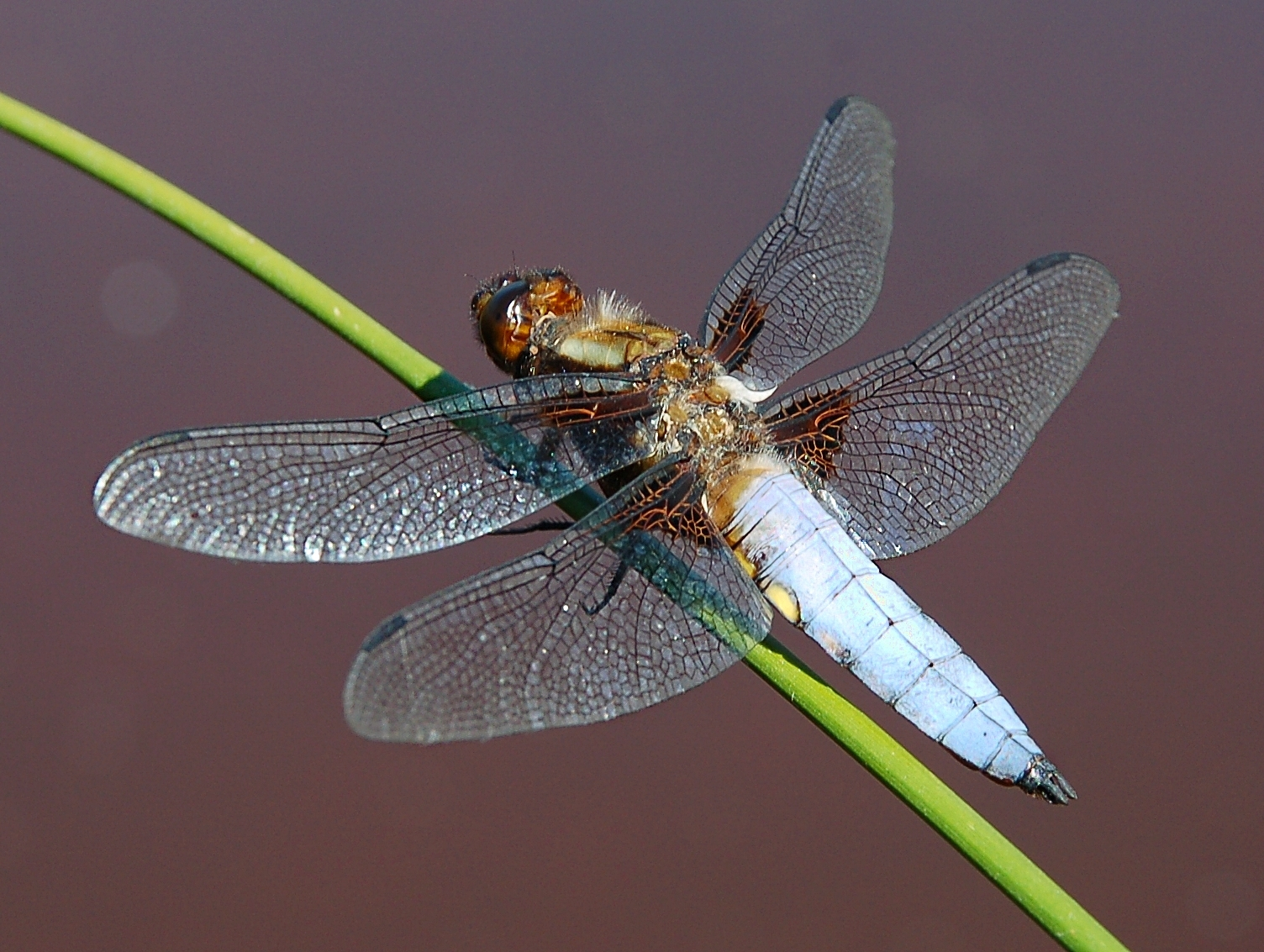
Libellula depressa

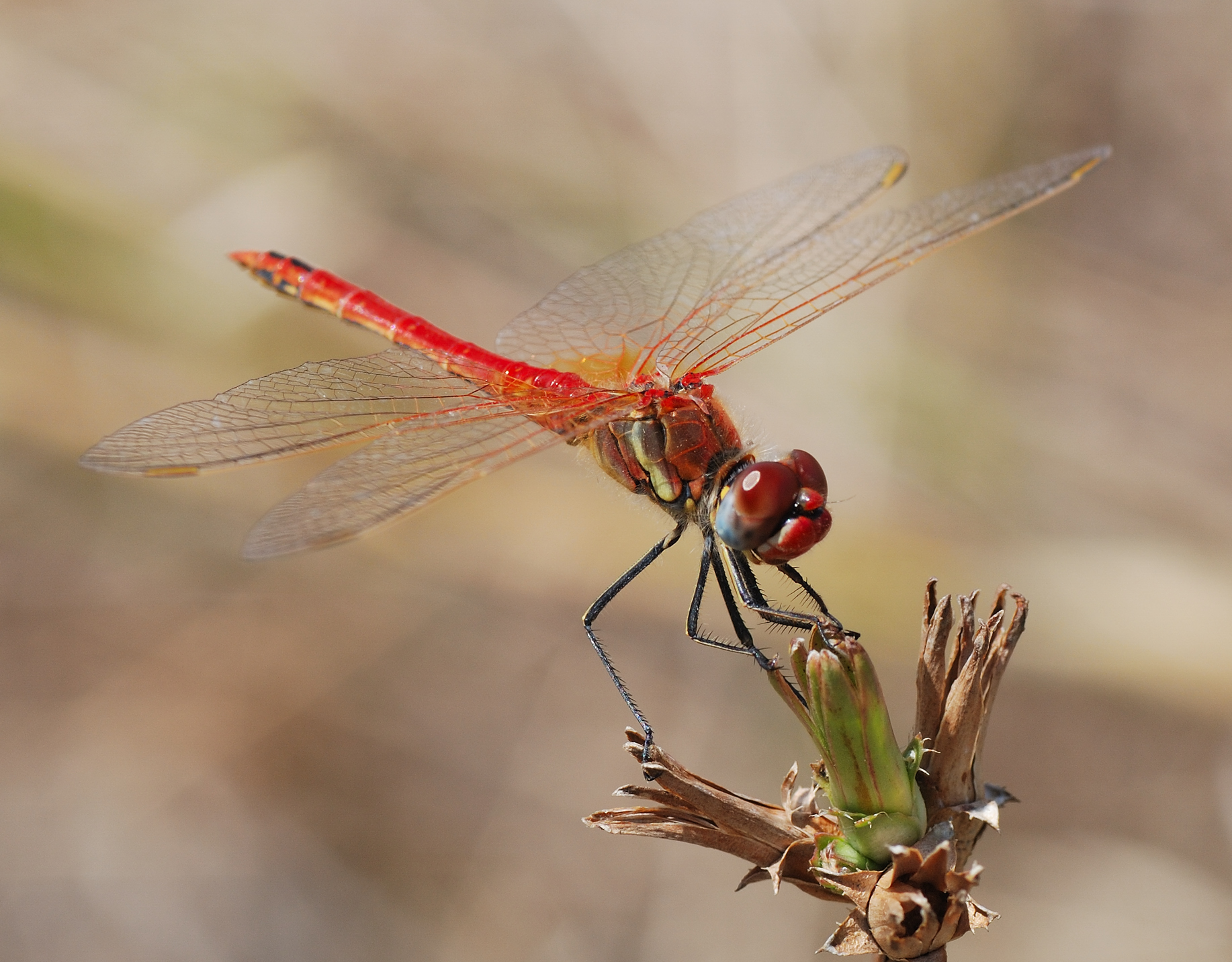
Sympetrum fonscolombii

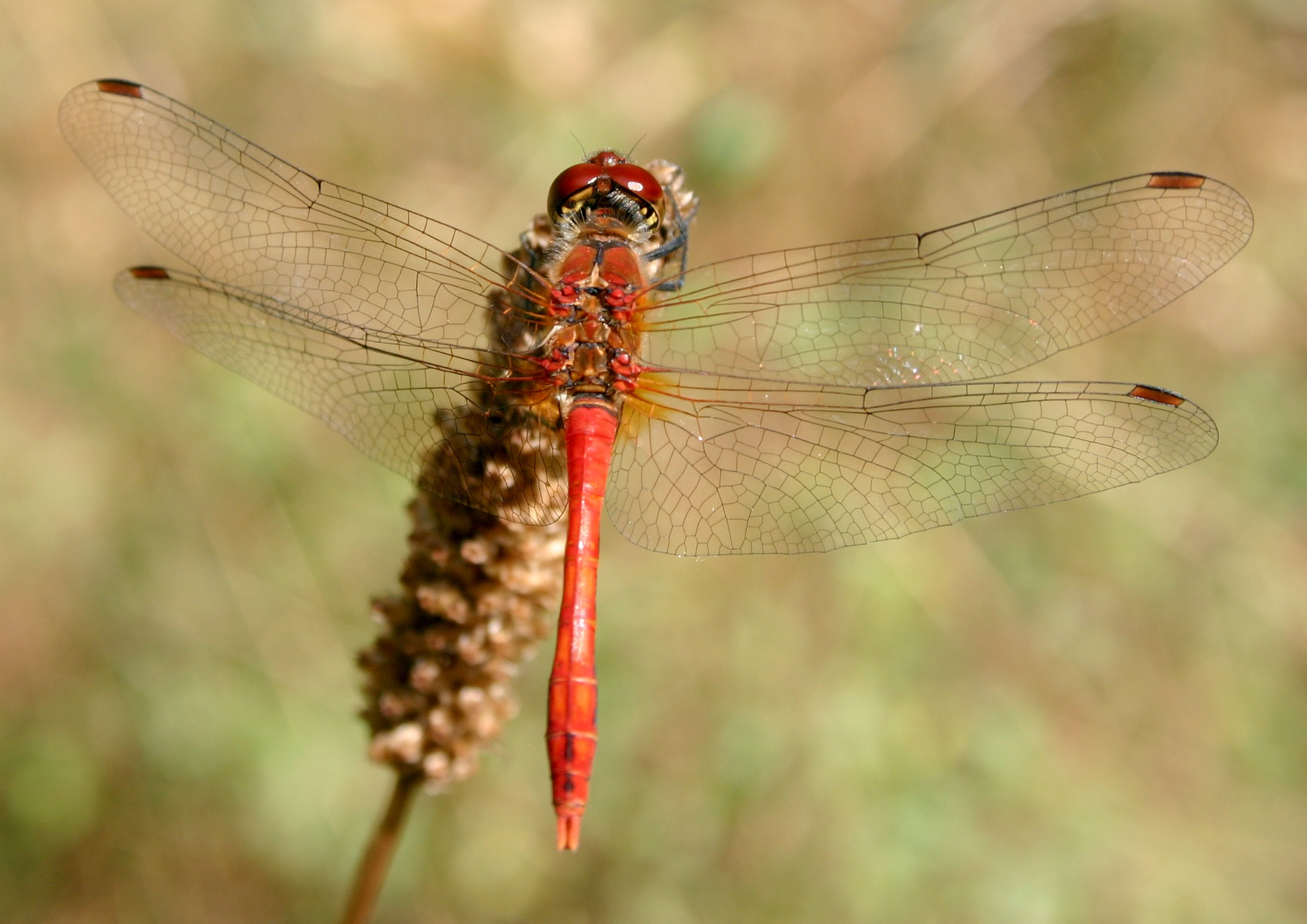
Sympetrum sanguineum

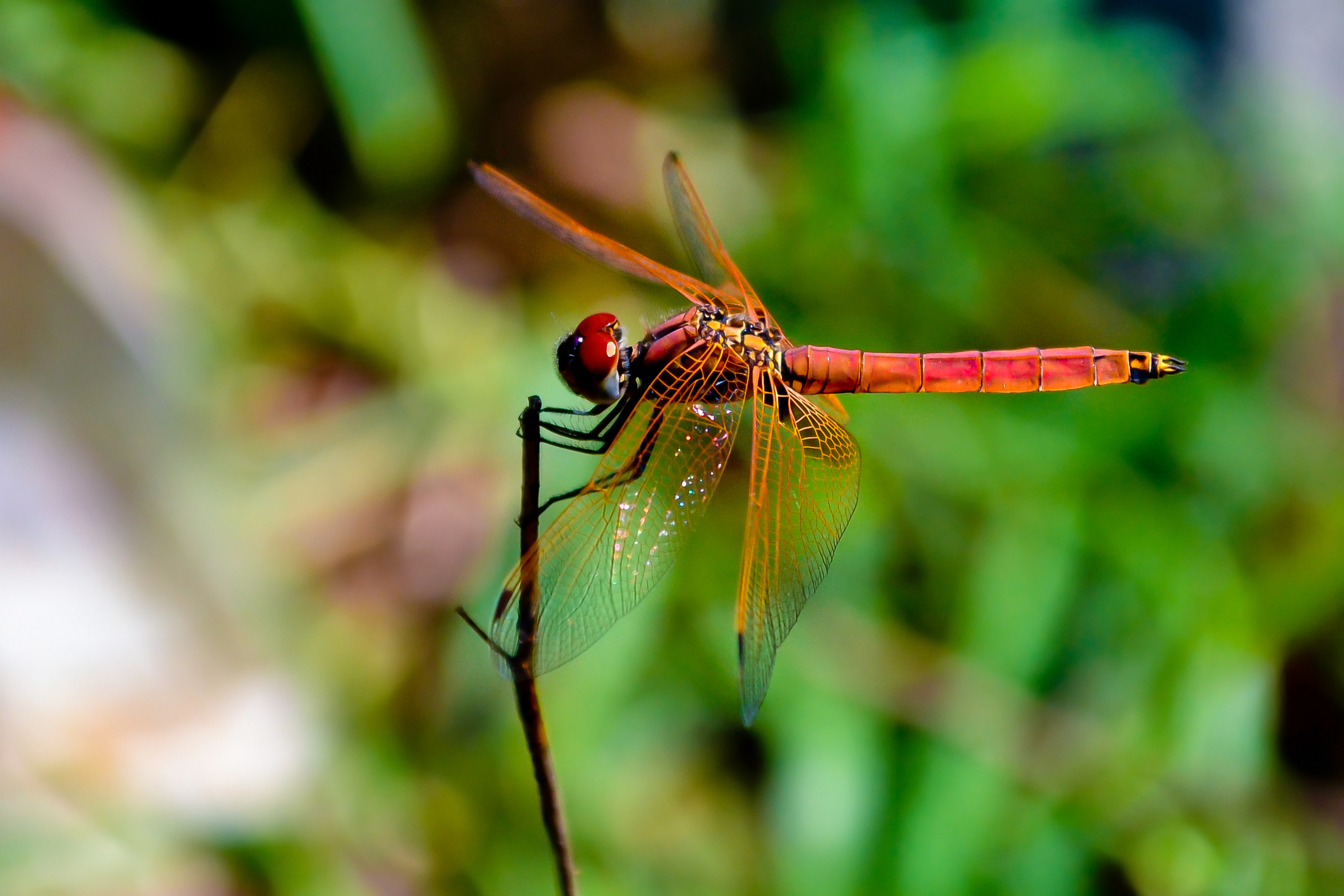
Trithemis aurora

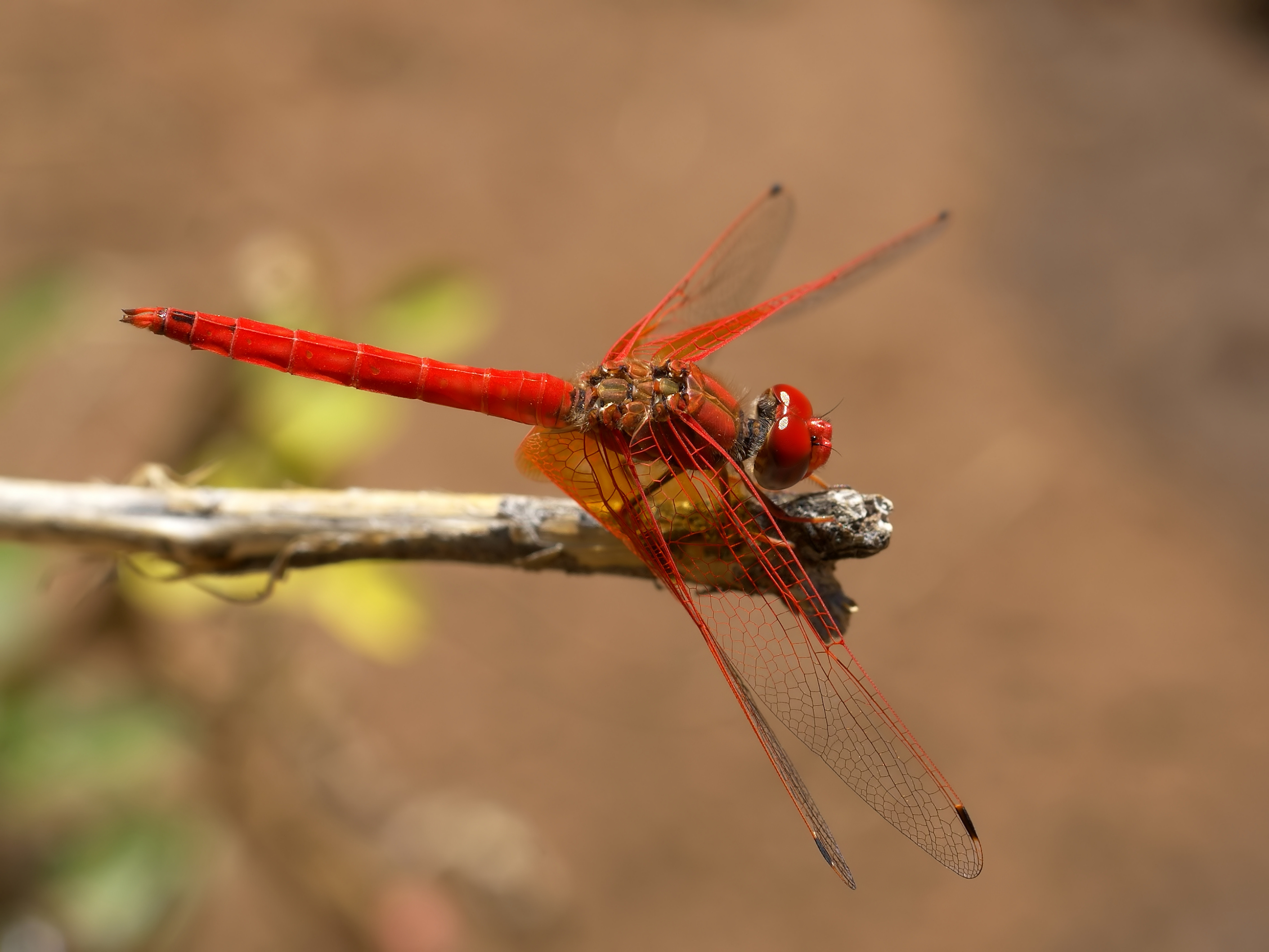
Trithemis kirbyi

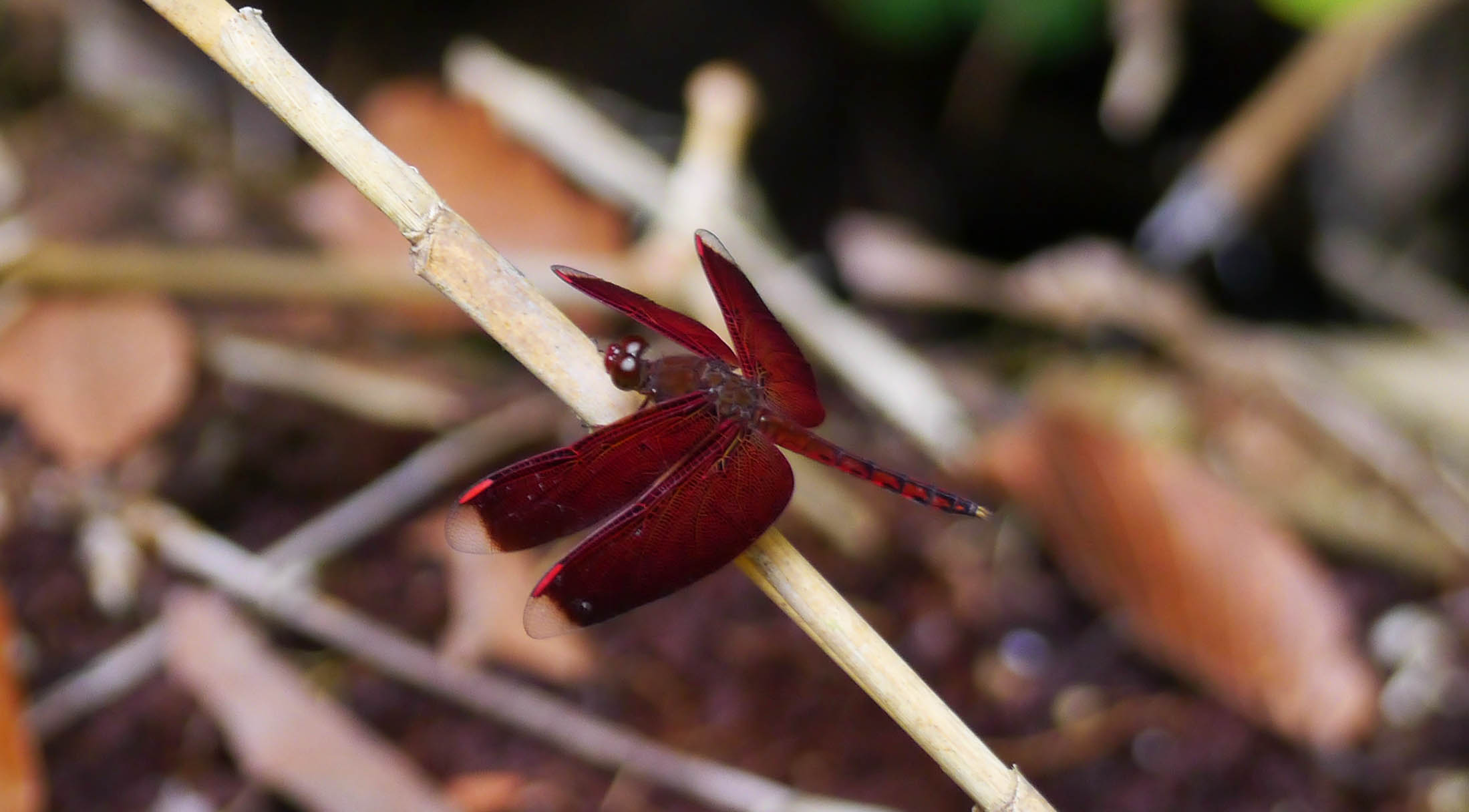
Neurothemis terminata

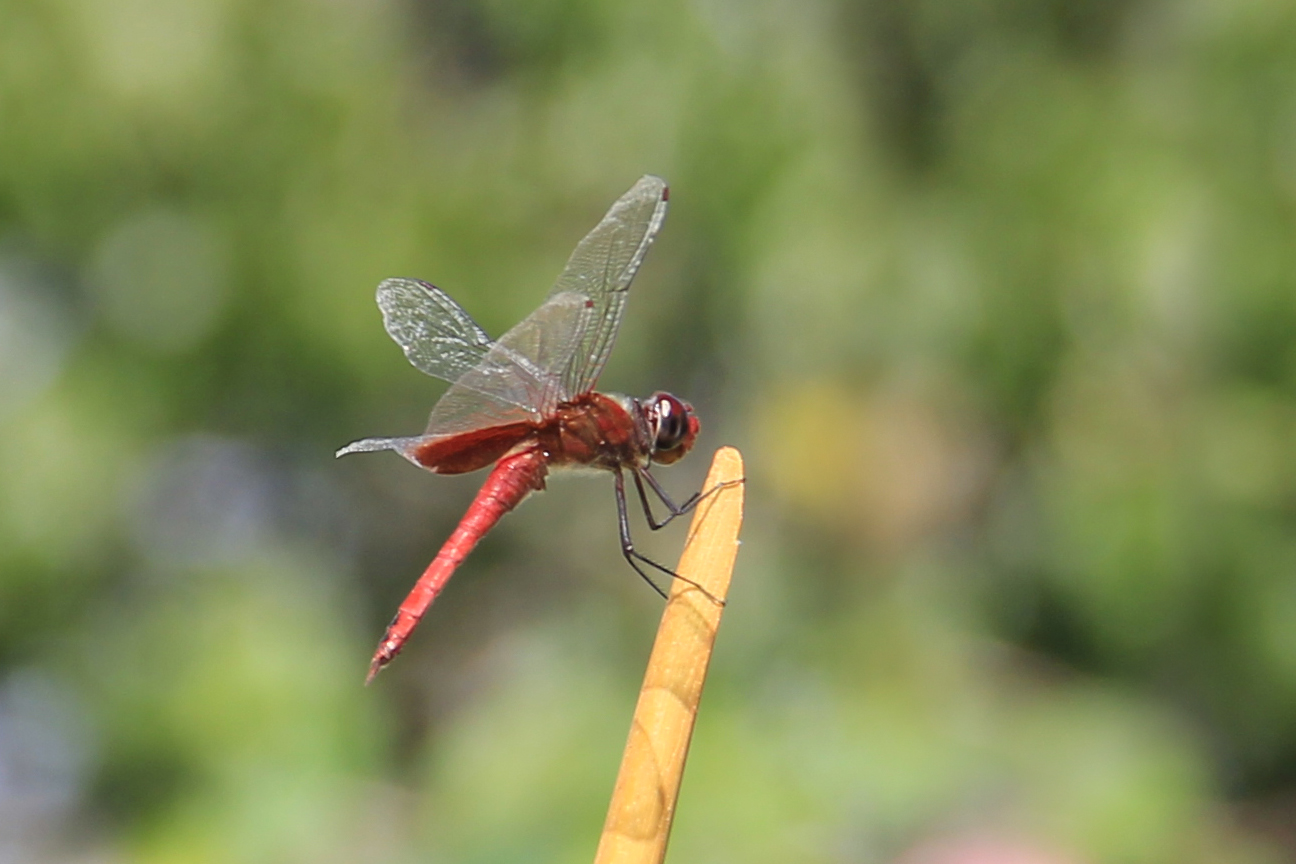
Crocothemis erythraea

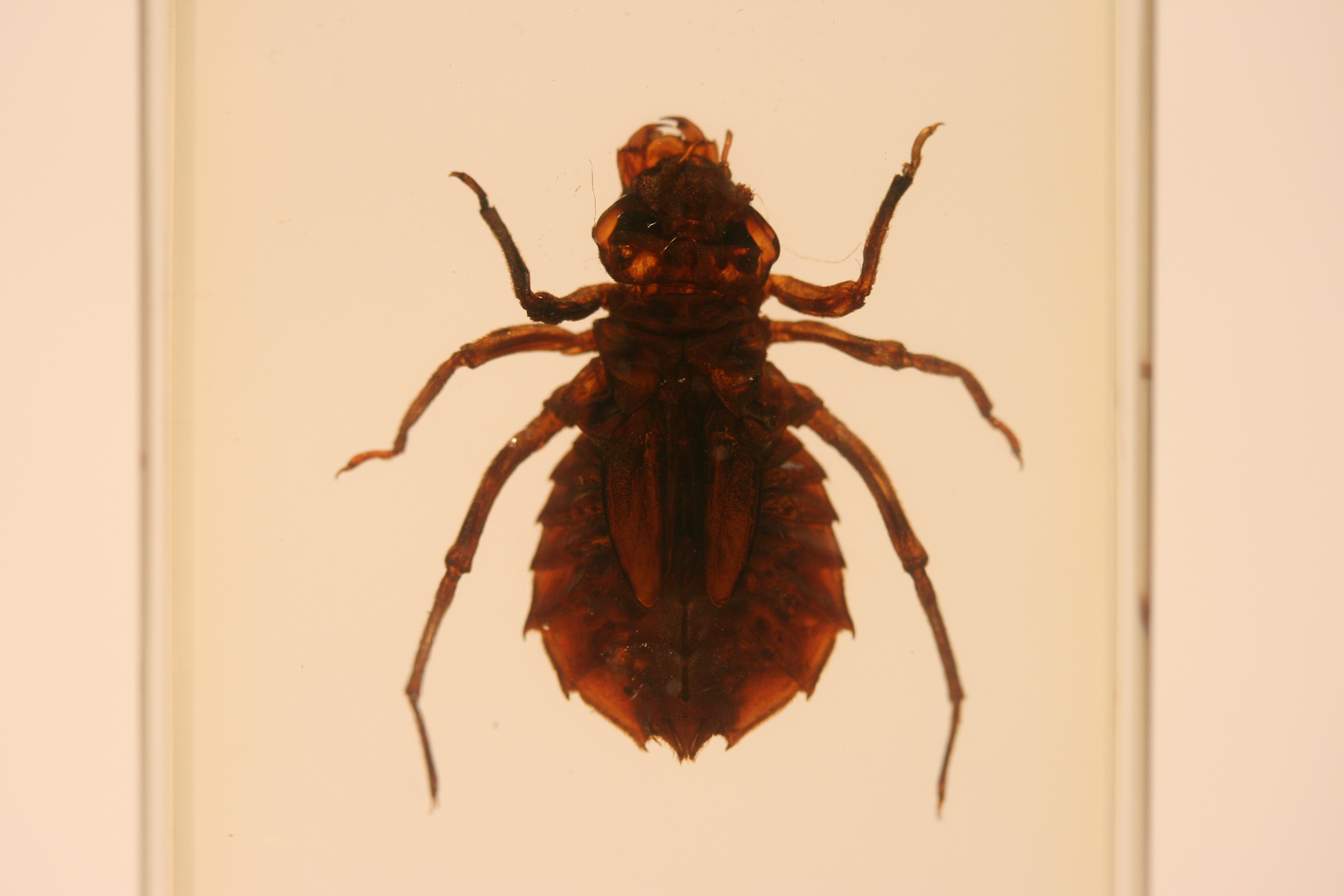
Libellulidae nymph

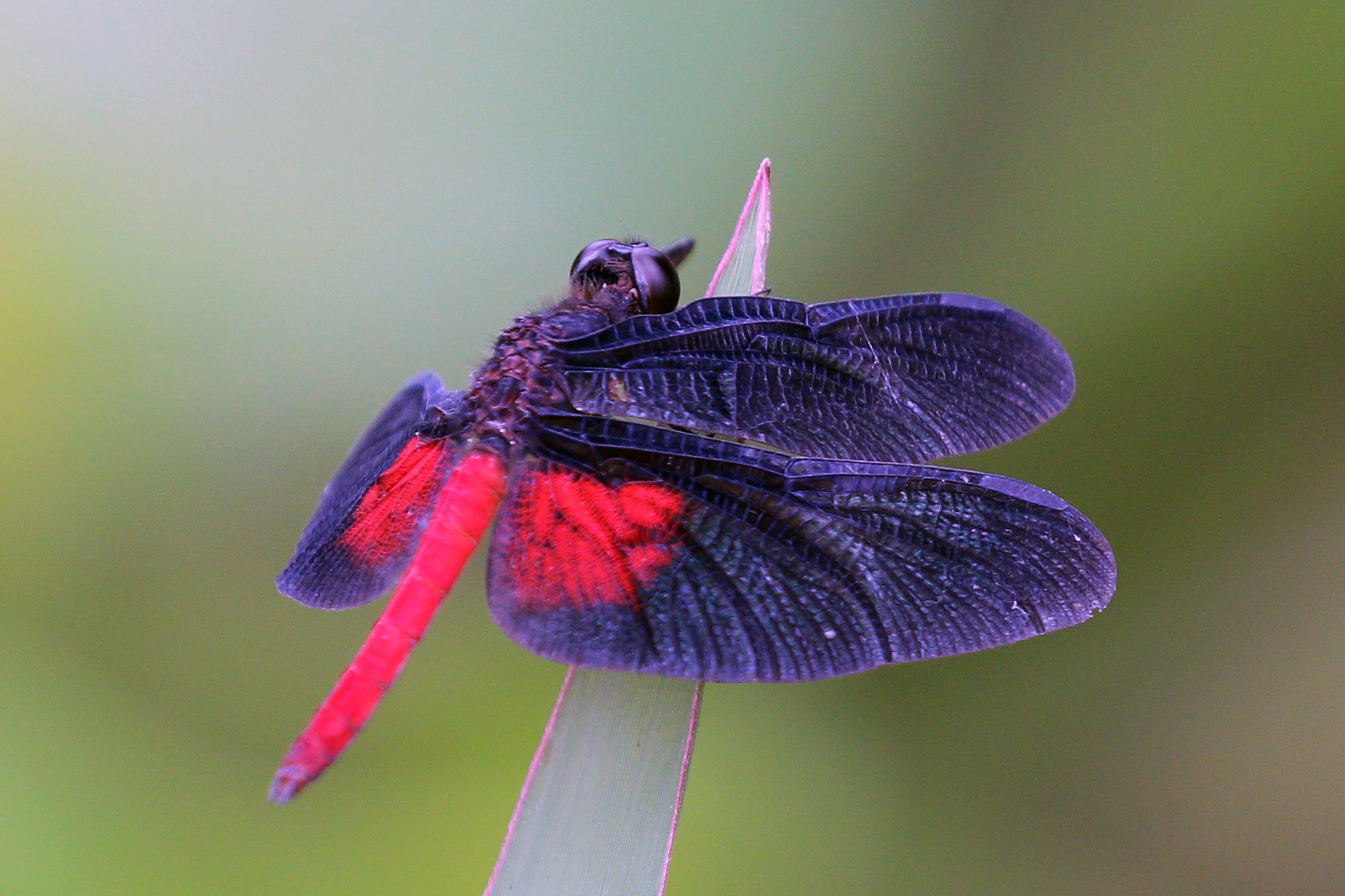
Diastatops pullata, male

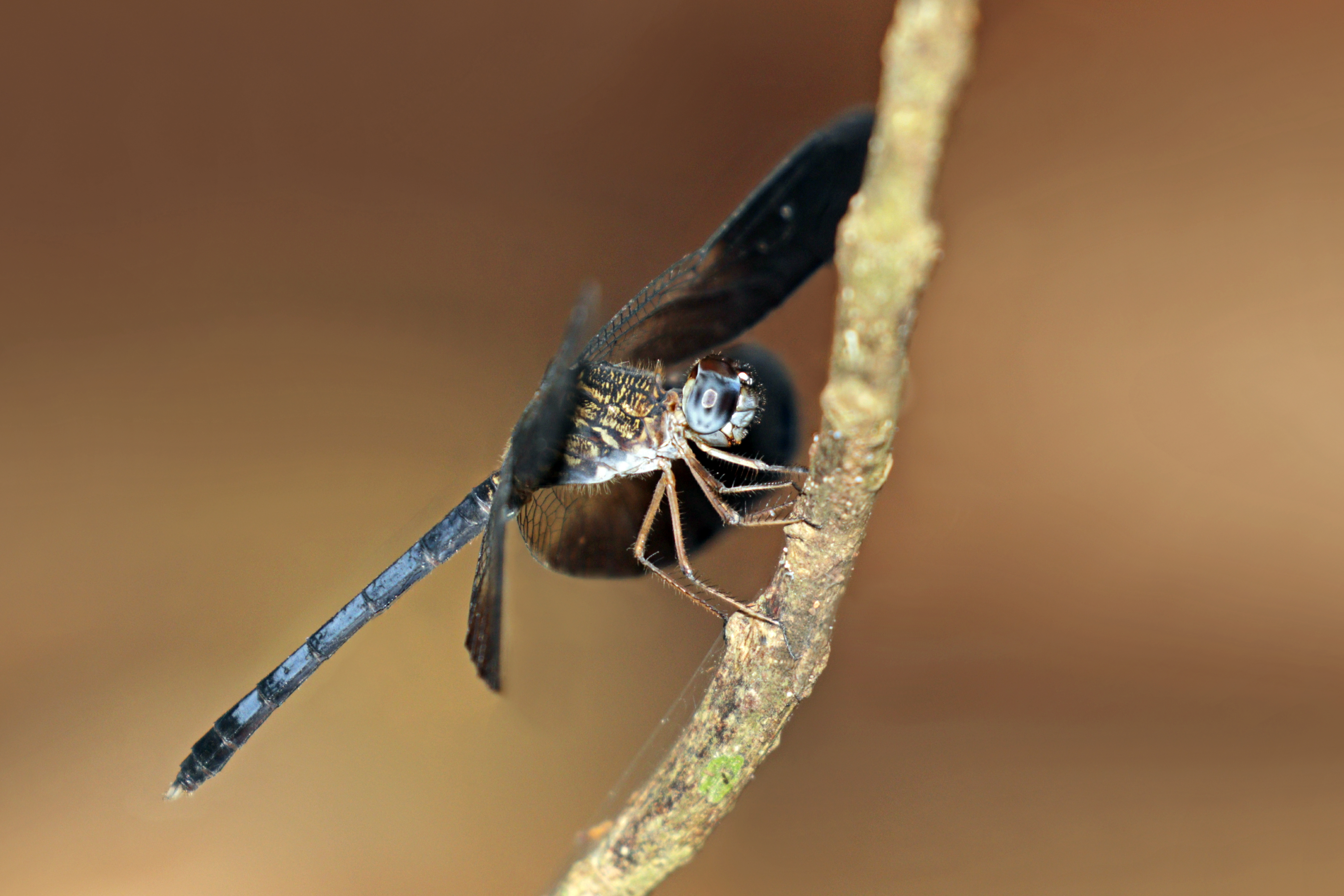
Uracis fastigiata, male

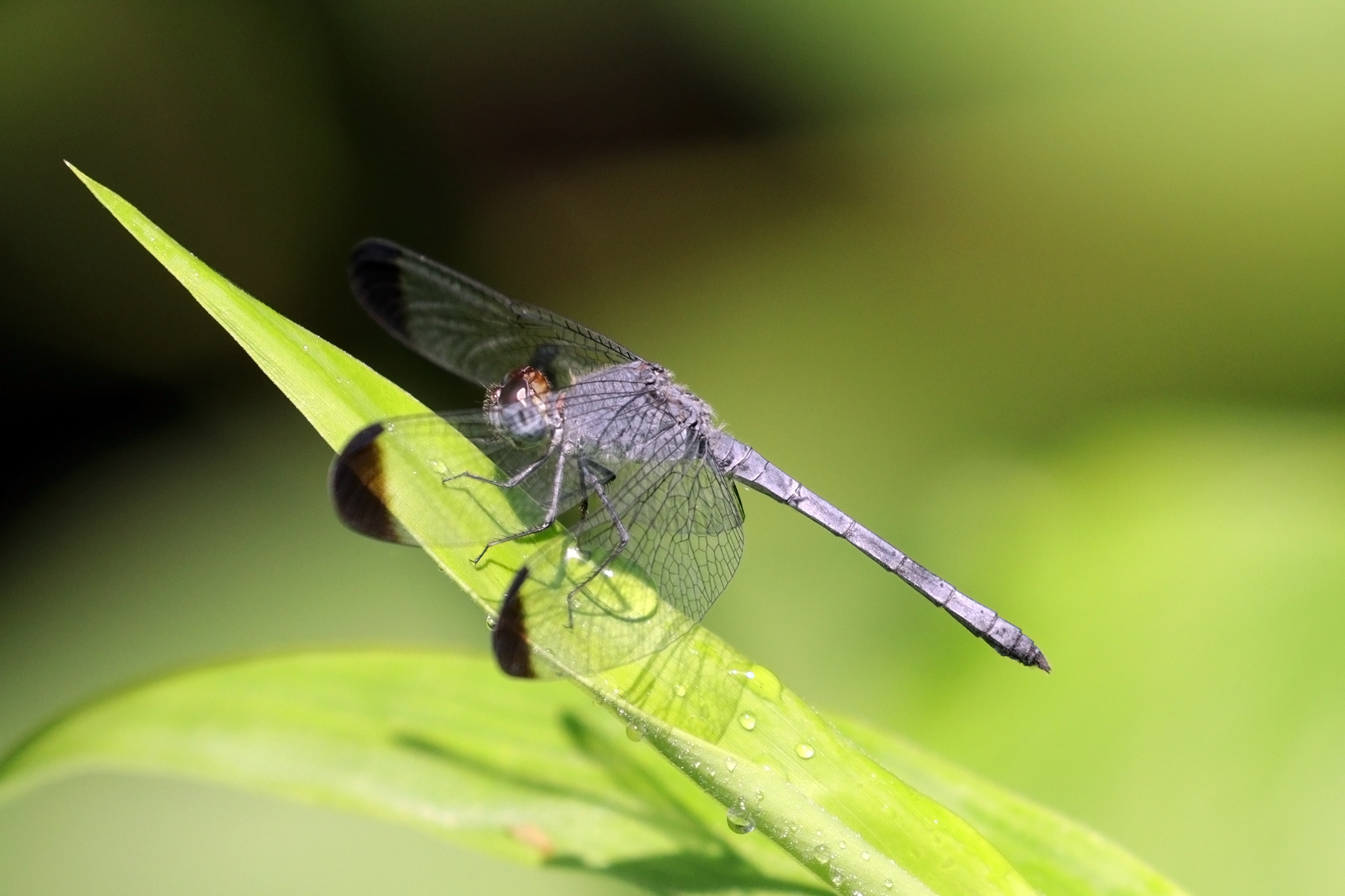
Uracis imbuta, male

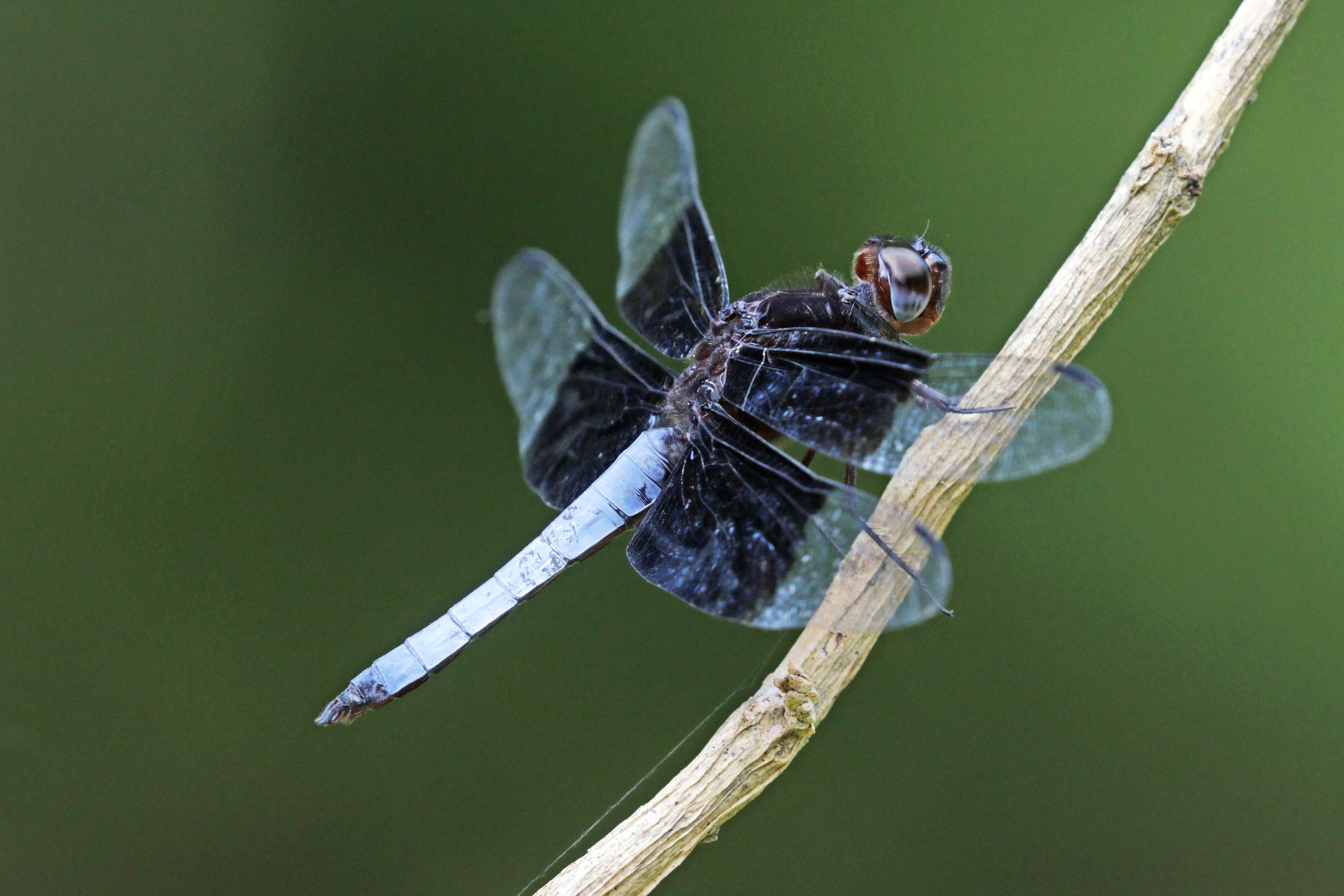
Thermorthemis madagascariensis, male

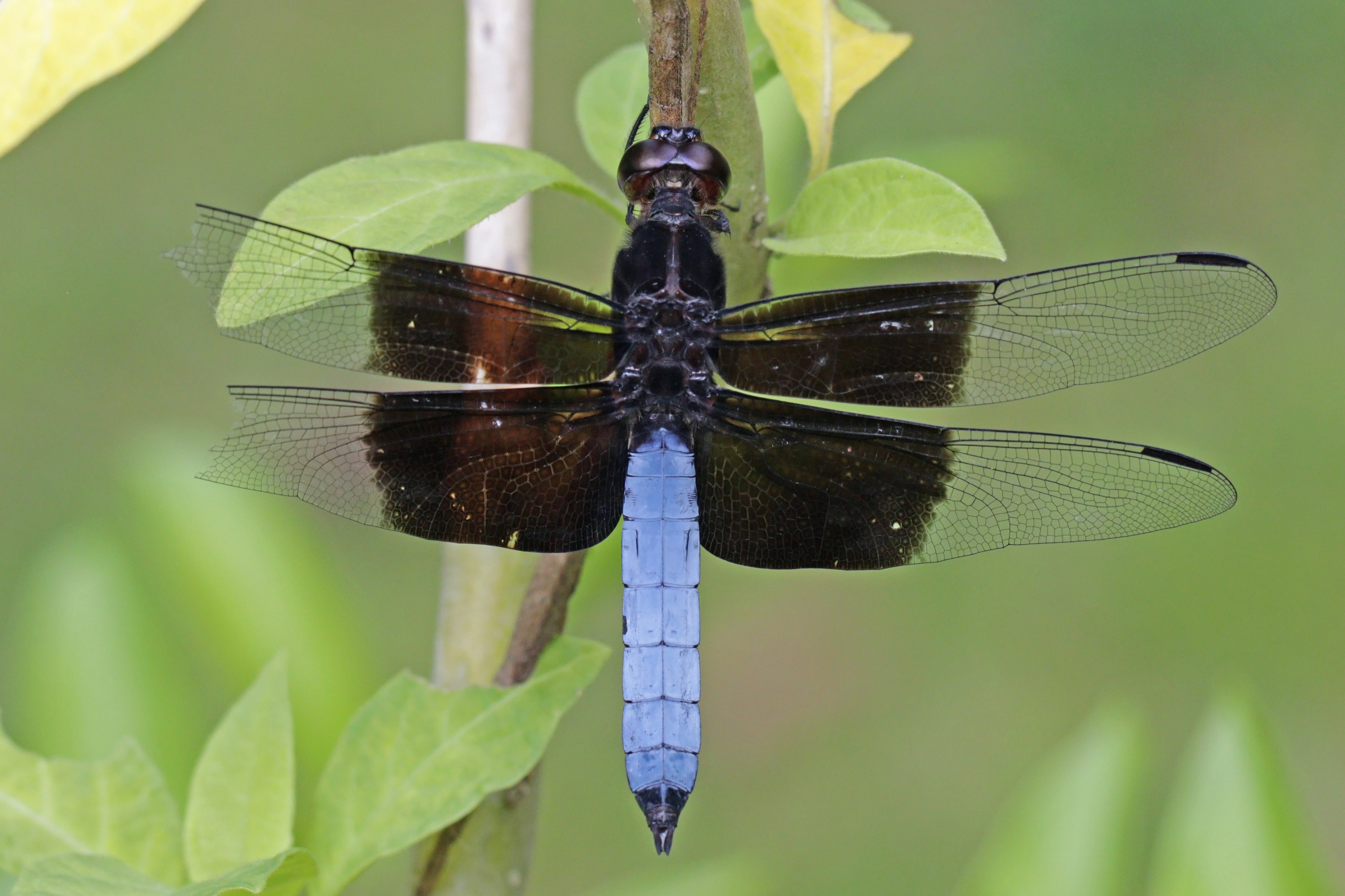
Thermorthemis madagascariensis, male

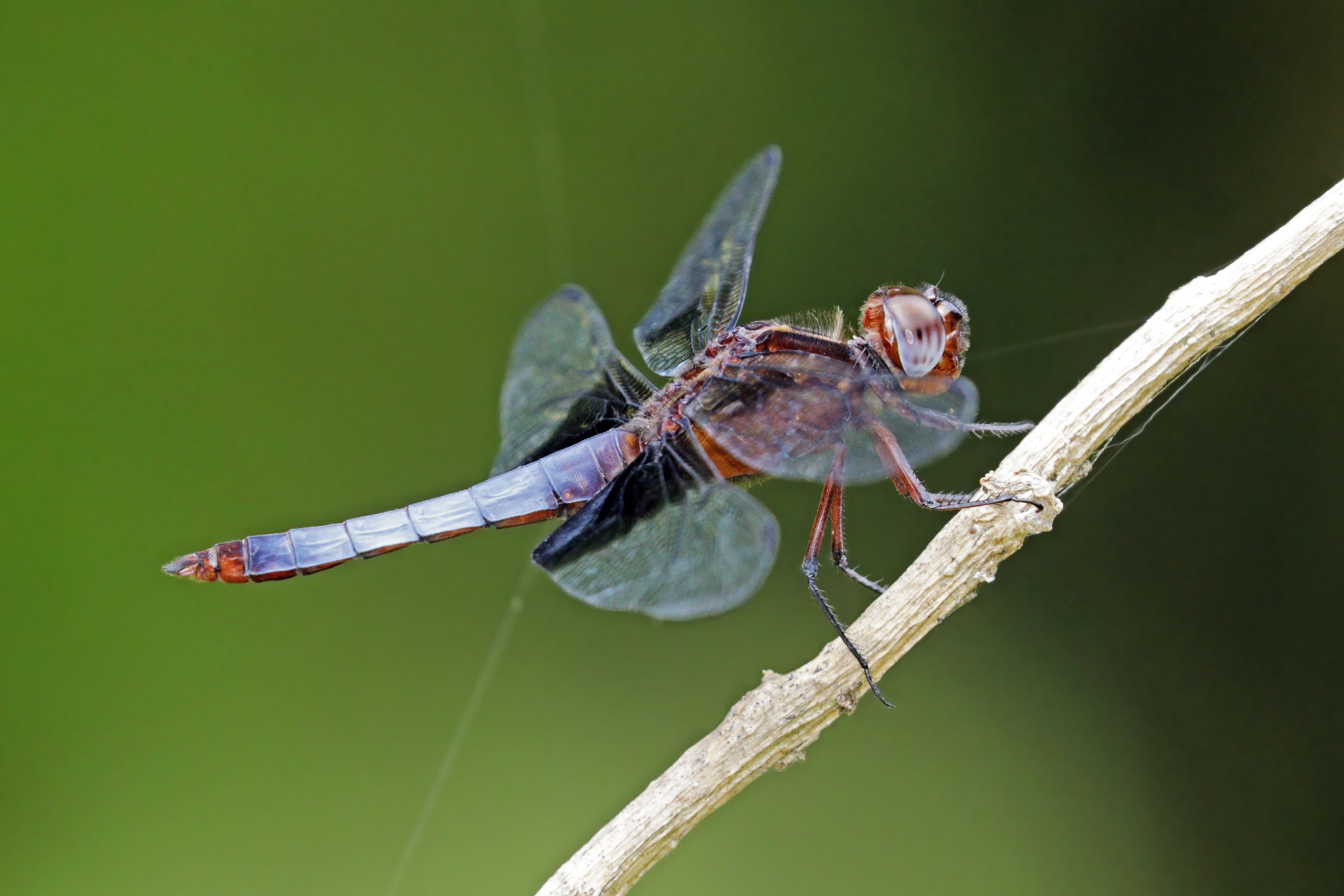
Thermorthemis madagascariensis, immature male

== Bibliography ==
- Silsby, Jill. 2001. Dragonflies of the World. Smithsonian Institution Press, Washington D.C.
