= Neuroptera in the 10th edition of Systema Naturae =

In the 10th edition of Systema Naturae, Carl Linnaeus classified the arthropods, including insects, arachnids and crustaceans, among his class "Insecta". Insects with net-veined wings were brought together under the name Neuroptera.

== Libellula (dragonflies & damselflies) ==
(Note: The current names of all Linnaeus' Libellula species are taken from Schorr et al.)

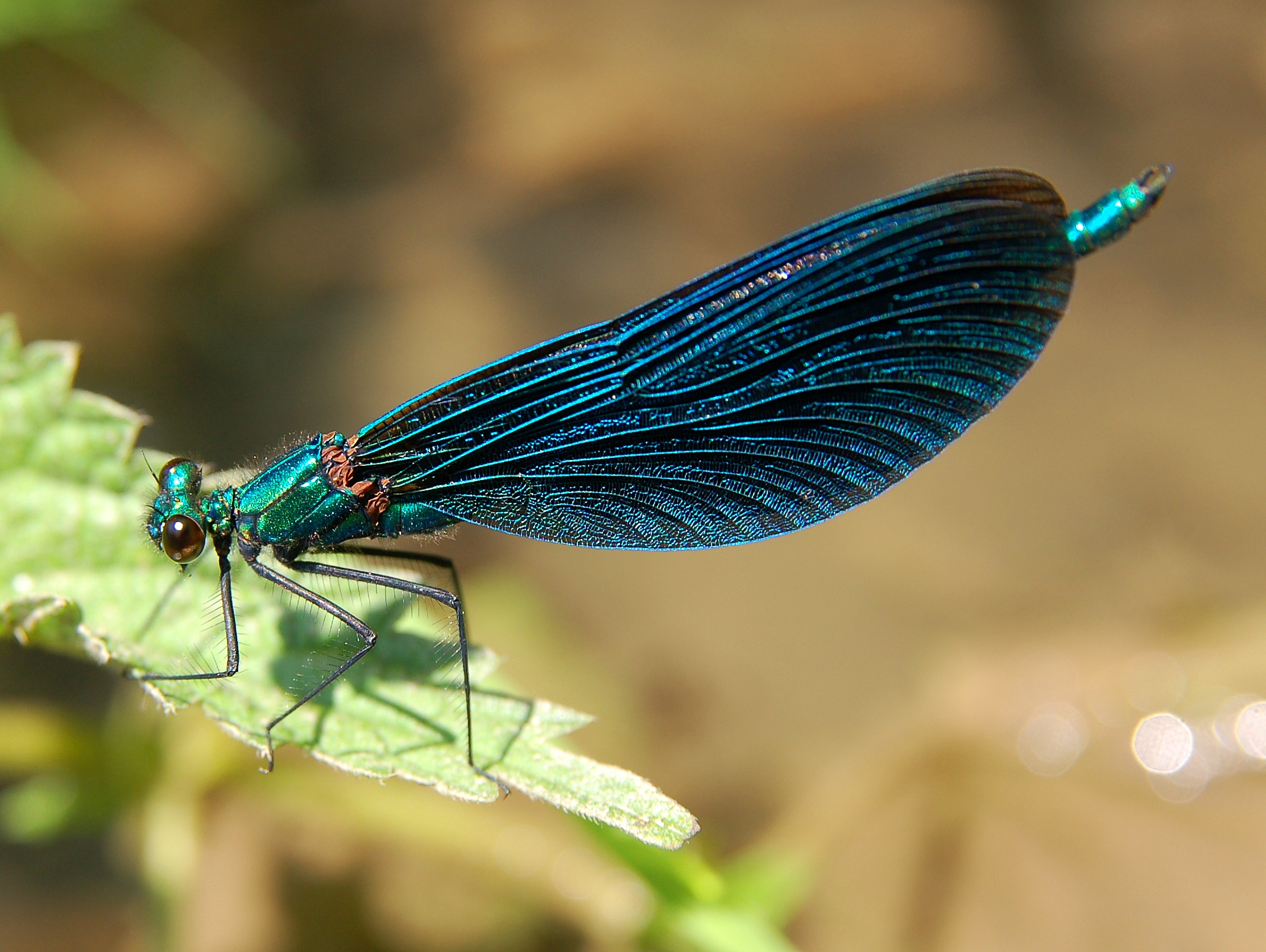
The Beautiful Demoiselle was named Libellula virgo in 1758.

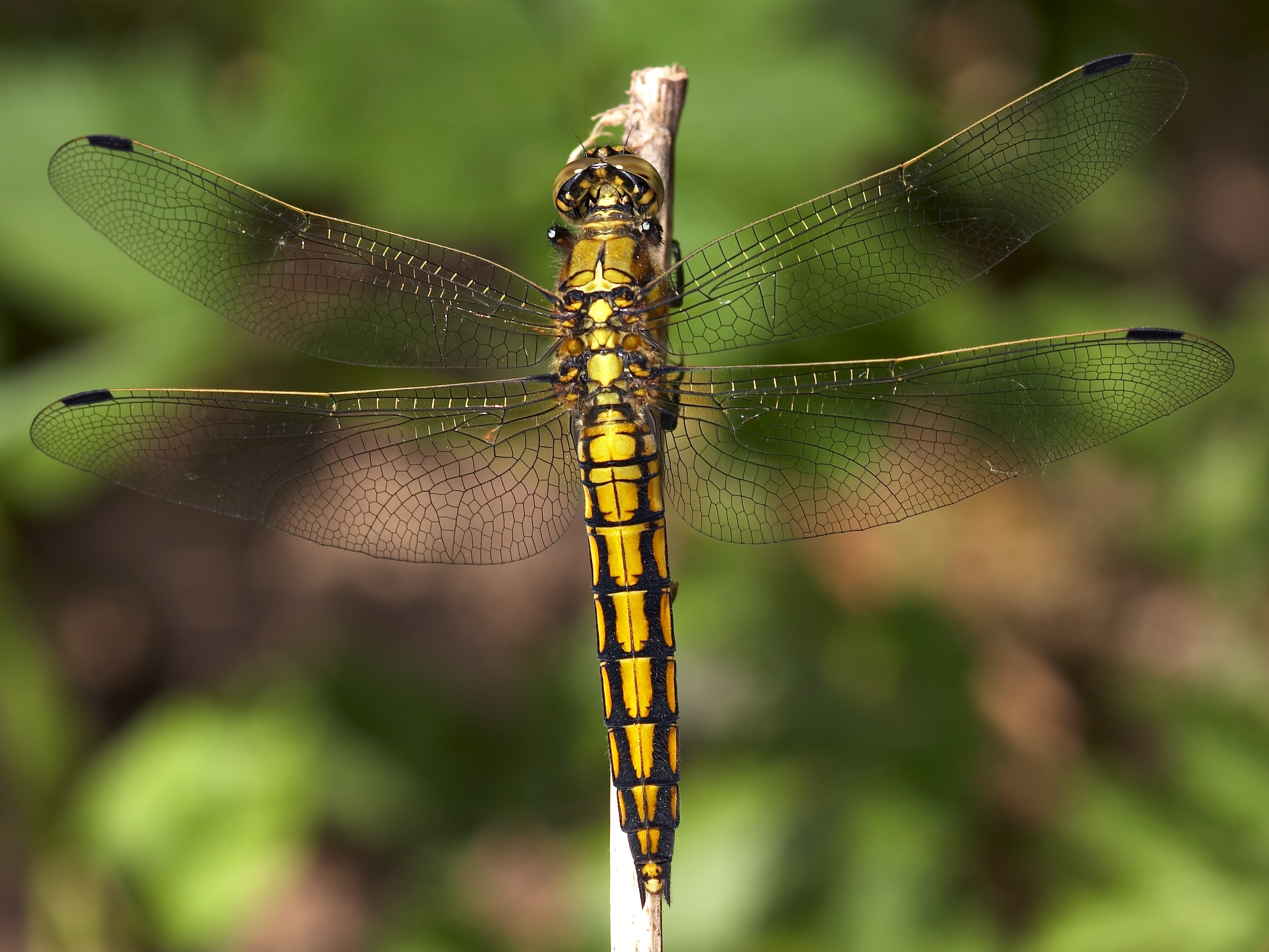
The Black-tailed Skimmer was named Libellula cancellata in 1758.

- Libellula quadrimaculata – Four-spotted Chaser
- Libellula flaveola – Yellow-winged darter
- Libellula vulgata – Vagrant Darter
- Libellula rubicunda – Leucorrhinia rubicunda
- Libellula depressa – Broad-bodied Chaser
- Libellula vulgatissima – Gomphus vulgatissimus
- Libellula cancellata – Black-tailed Skimmer
- Libellula aenea – Downy Emerald
- Libellula grandis – Brown Hawker
- Libellula juncea – Common Hawker
- Libellula forcipata – Onychogomphus forcipatus
- Libellula fasciata & Libellula americana – Zenithoptera fasciata
- Libellula umbrata – Erythrodiplax umbrata
- Libellula dimidiata – Diastatops dimidiata
- Libellula chinensis – Neurobasis chinensis
- Libellula virgo – Beautiful Demoiselle
- Libellula puella – Azure Damselfly

== Ephemera (mayflies) ==
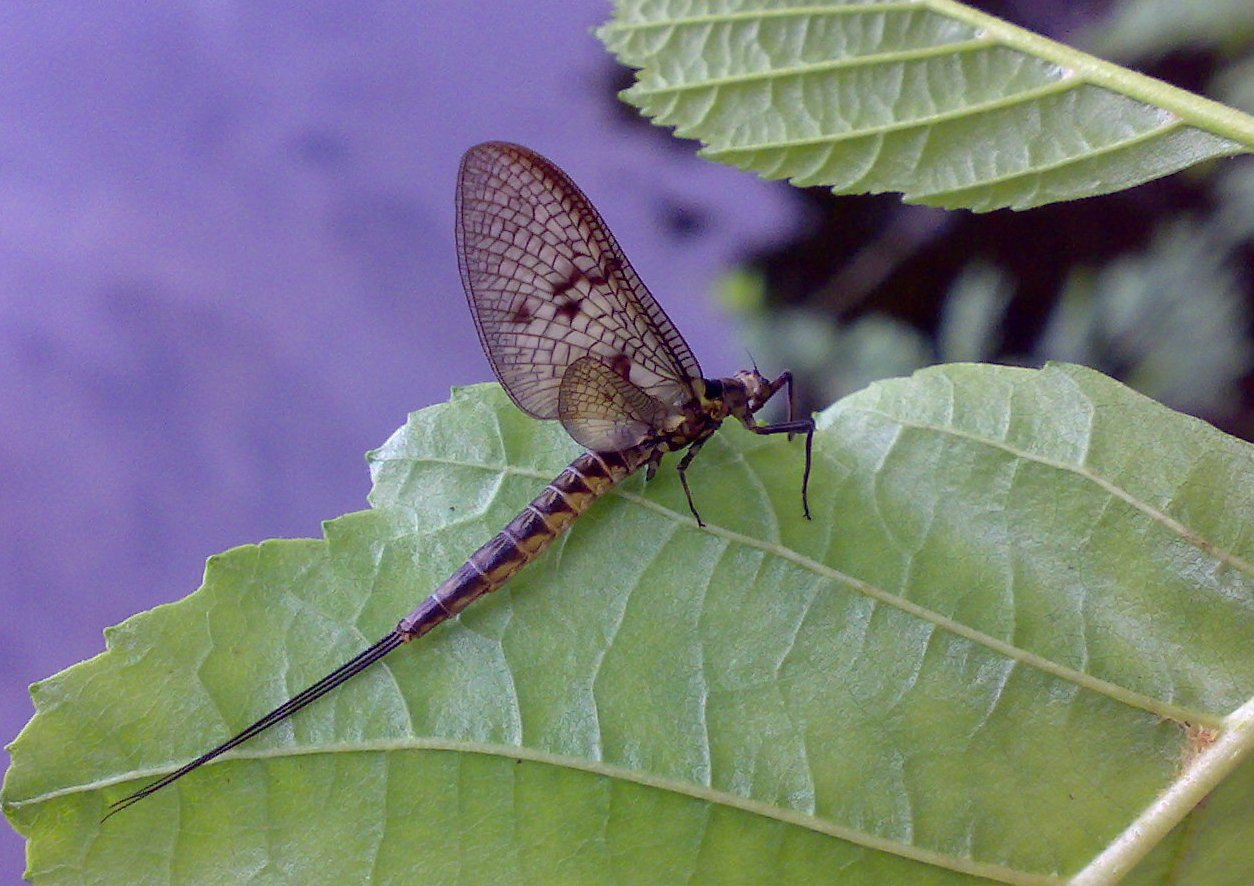
The mayfly Ephemera vulgata was named in 1758.

- Ephemera vulgata
- Ephemera bioculata – nomen rejiciendum
- Ephemera culiciformis – Baetis fuscatus
- Ephemera horaria – Caenis horaria
- Ephemera mutica – Alainites muticus
- Ephemera vespertina – Leptophlebia vespertina

== Phryganea (caddisflies) ==
(Note: The current names of all Linnaeus' Phryganea species are taken from Holzenthal et al. (2007).)

- Phryganea phalaenoides – Semblis phalaenoides
- Phryganea striata – Oligotricha striata
- Phryganea grisea – Limnephilus griseus
- Phryganea grandis
- Phryganea rhombica – Limnephilus rhombicus
- Phryganea bimaculata – Neureclipsis bimaculata
- Phryganea flavilatera – Sialis flavilatera
- Phryganea bicaudata – Diura bicaudata
- Phryganea nigra – Mystacides niger
- Phryganea longicornis – Mystacides longicornis
- Phryganea filosa – Oecetis ochracea
- Phryganea waeneri – Tinodes waeneri
- Phryganea albifrons – Athripsodes albifrons
- Phryganea bilineata – Athripsodes bilineatus
- Phryganea nebulosa – Taeniopteryx nebulosa
- Phryganea fusca – Leuctra fusca (in Plecoptera)
- Phryganea flava – Limnephilus centralis

== Hemerobius (lacewings) ==
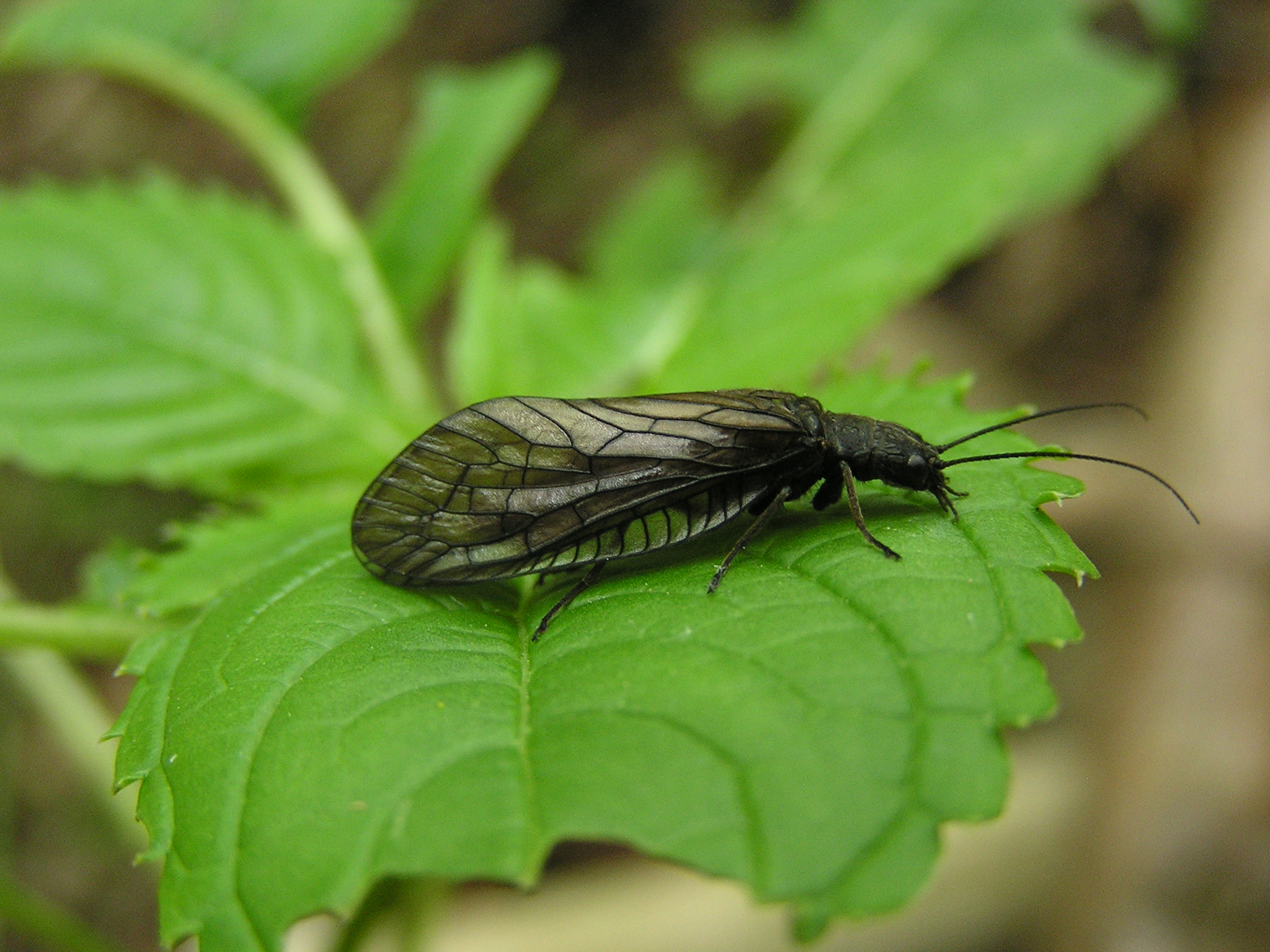
The alderfly Sialis lutaria was named Hemerobius lutarius in 1758.

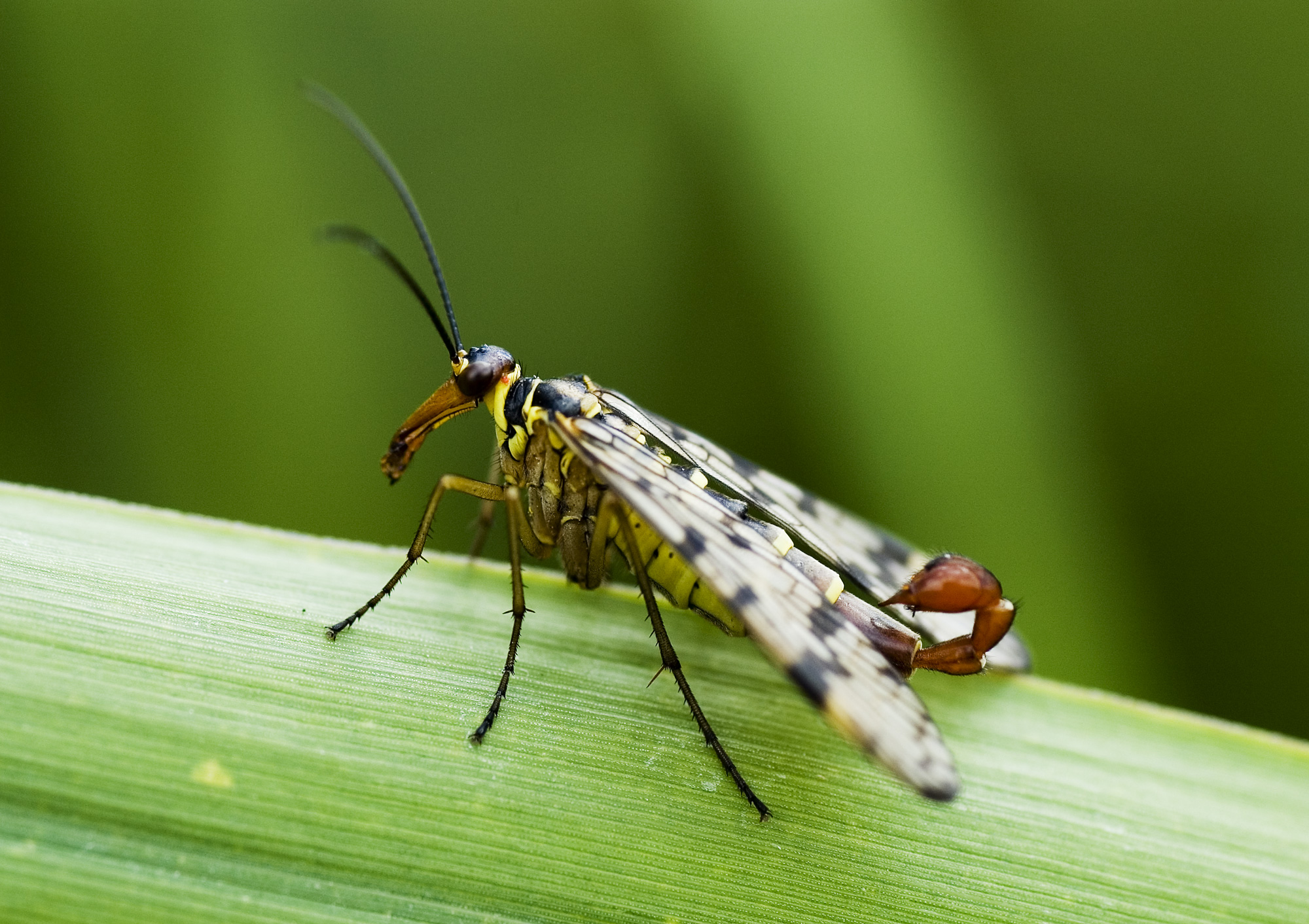
The scorpionfly Panorpa communis was named in 1758.

- Hemerobius perla & Hemerobius chrysops – Chrysopa perla
- Hemerobius phalaenoides – Drepanopteryx phalaenoides
- Hemerobius formicaleo & Hemerobius formicalynx – Myrmeleon formicarius
- Hemerobius testaceus – Coptotermes testaceus
- Hemerobius marginalis – Rhinotermes marginalis
- Hemerobius humulinus
- Hemerobius sexpunctatus – Trichadenotecnum sexpunctatum
- Hemerobius flavicans – Lachesilla pedicularia
- Hemerobius lutarius – Sialis lutaria
- Hemerobius speciosus – Palpares speciosus
- Hemerobius albus – Chrysopidia ciliata
- Hemerobius cornutus – Corydalus cornutus
- Hemerobius pedicularius – Lachesilla pedicularia

== Panorpa (scorpionflies) ==
- Panorpa communis
- Panorpa germanica
- Panorpa coa – Nemoptera coa

== Raphidia (snakeflies) ==
- Raphidia ophiopsis
