= Agrypnia glacialis =

Scientific classification
- Kingdom: Animalia
- Phylum: Arthropoda
- Clade: Pancrustacea
- Class: Insecta
- Order: Trichoptera
- Family: Phryganeidae
- Genus: Agrypnia
- Species: A. glacialis

Binomial name
- Agrypnia glacialis Hagen, 1873

Species of caddisfly

Agrypnia glacialis is a species of giant caddisfly in the family Phryganeidae. It is found in North America.
