= Oligostomis ocelligera =

Scientific classification
- Kingdom: Animalia
- Phylum: Arthropoda
- Clade: Pancrustacea
- Class: Insecta
- Order: Trichoptera
- Family: Phryganeidae
- Genus: Oligostomis
- Species: O. ocelligera

Binomial name
- Oligostomis ocelligera (Walker, 1852)

Synonyms
- Neuronia ocelligera Walker, 1852

Species of caddisfly

Oligostomis ocelligera is a species of giant casemaker in the family Phryganeidae. It is found in North America.
