= Loch Airigh na Beinne, Assynt =

Scottish loch

Loch Airigh na Beinne
- Location within Sutherland
- Location: Scottish Highlands
- Coordinates: 58°13′57″N 5°02′04″W
- Primary inflows: Allt na Saobhaid Moire
- Primary outflows: Allt a' Ghamhna
- Basin countries: Scotland, United Kingdom
- Max. length: 357 m (1,171 ft)
- Max. width: 129 m (423 ft)
- Surface elevation: 130 m (430 ft)

Loch Airigh na Beinne is a mountain lochan (small loch) in Assynt, Scotland, roughly 2km southwest of Unapool.

The lochan sits on the northeast slopes of Assynt's iconic Quinag, resting on a bed of Lewisian gneiss. Its name means "Loch of the Mountain Shieling" in Scottish Gaelic.

A 2020 survey of the loch found several aquatics "typically found in such acid waters", including the white water-lily, water lobelia, bulrush, and floating spike-rush. Surveyors also found evidence of caddisfly and northern eggar populations.
