= Trichostegia =

Trichostegia may refer to:

- Trichostegia (caddisfly), a caddisfly genus in the family Phryganeidae
- Trichostegia, a synonym of the plant genus Asteridea.
