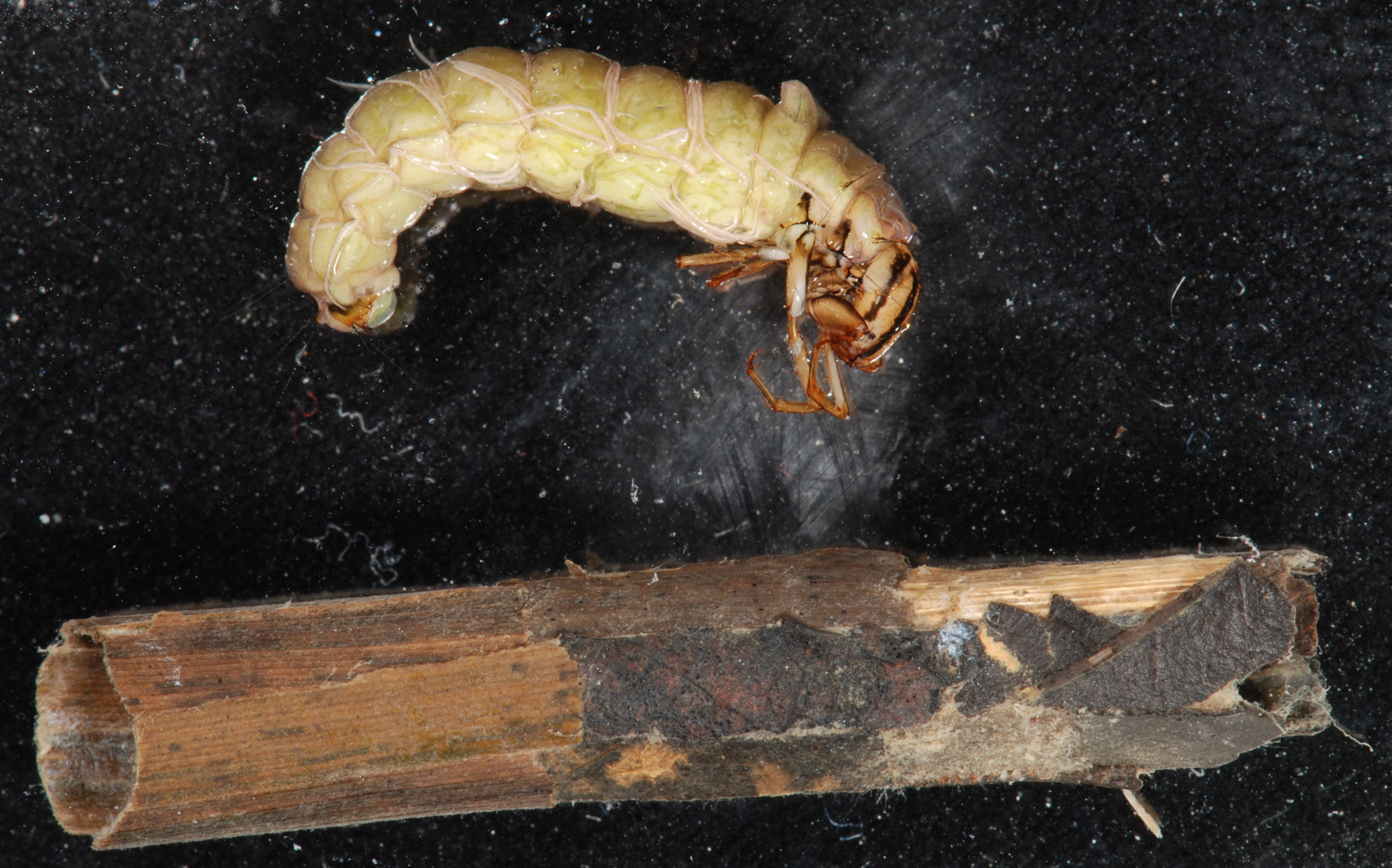

Scientific classification
- Kingdom: Animalia
- Phylum: Arthropoda
- Clade: Pancrustacea
- Class: Insecta
- Order: Trichoptera
- Family: Phryganeidae
- Genus: Ptilostomis
- Species: P. ocellifera

Binomial name
- Ptilostomis ocellifera (Walker, 1852)

Synonyms
- Neuronia ocellifera Walker, 1852; Neuronia simulans Betten & Mosely, 1940; Ptilostomis kovalevskii Kolenati, 1859; Ptilostomis simulans (Betten & Mosely, 1940)

= Ptilostomis ocellifera =

Species of caddisfly

Ptilostomis ocellifera is a species of giant casemaker in the family Phryganeidae. It is found in North America.
