= Agrypnia =

Agrypnia may refer to:

- Insomnia
- Vigil, a period of purposeful sleeplessness, an occasion for devotional watching, or an observance
- The Wake, a 2005 Greek film
- Agrypnia (caddisfly), a genus of caddisflies in the family Phryganeidae
- A case of sleep deprivation
