= Hagenella apicalis =

Scientific classification
- Kingdom: Animalia
- Phylum: Arthropoda
- Clade: Pancrustacea
- Class: Insecta
- Order: Trichoptera
- Family: Phryganeidae
- Genus: Hagenella
- Species: H. apicalis

Binomial name
- Hagenella apicalis Matsumura, 1904

Species of insect

Hagenella apicalis is a species of caddisfly insect first described by Shōnen Matsumura in 1904. It belongs to the genus Hagenella and the family Phryganeidae. Hagenella apicalis is found in Northeastern Asia, such as in Japan, specifically on the island Hokkaido, or in Russia on Sakhalin.
