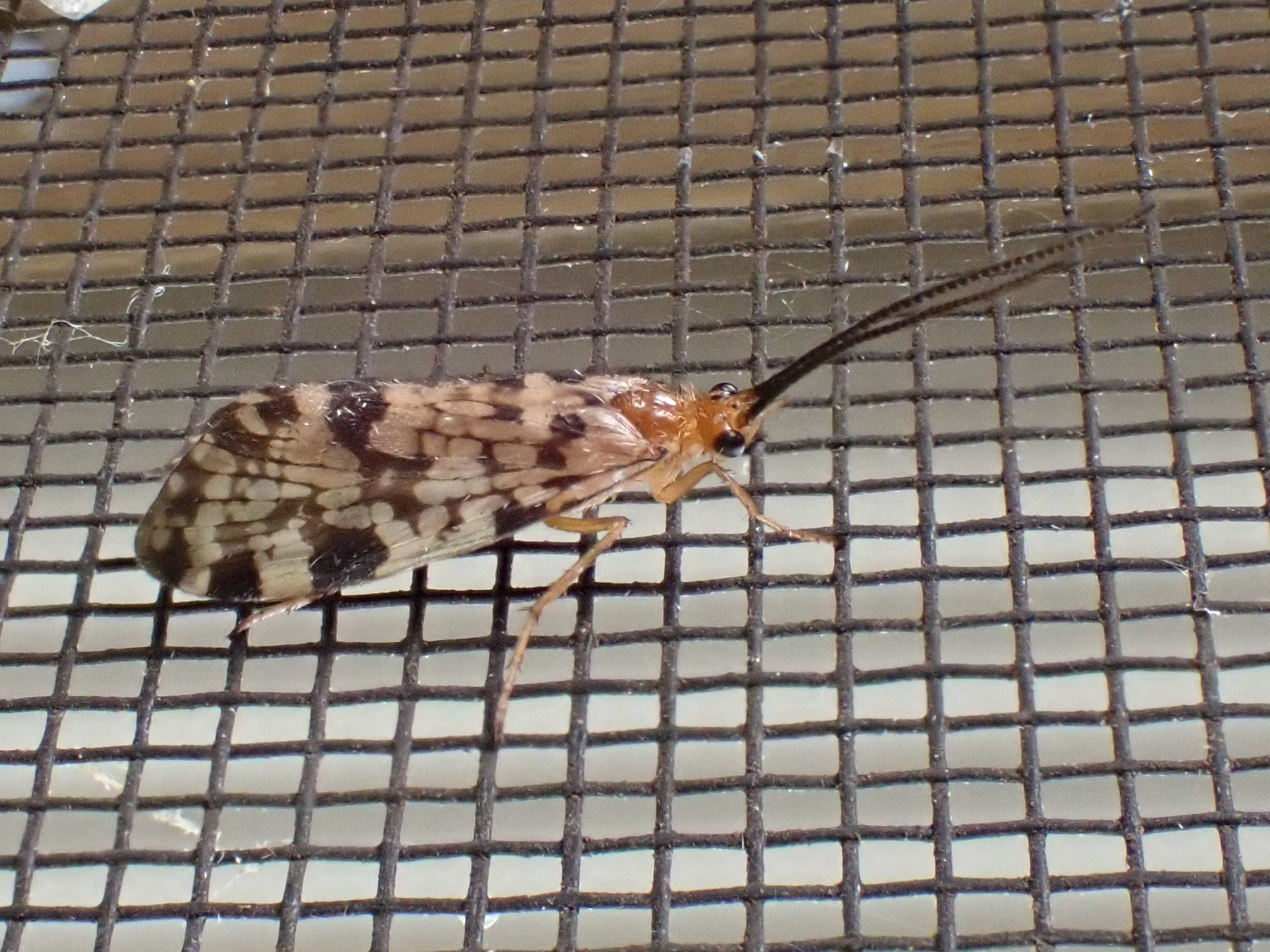

Scientific classification
- Kingdom: Animalia
- Phylum: Arthropoda
- Clade: Pancrustacea
- Class: Insecta
- Order: Trichoptera
- Family: Phryganeidae
- Genus: Banksiola
- Species: B. dossuaria

Binomial name
- Banksiola dossuaria (Say, 1828)

Synonyms
- Phryganea dossuaria Say, 1828

= Banksiola dossuaria =

Species of caddisfly

Banksiola dossuaria is a species of giant casemaker in the family Phryganeidae. It is found in North America.
