= Ptilostomis angustipennis =

Scientific classification
- Kingdom: Animalia
- Phylum: Arthropoda
- Clade: Pancrustacea
- Class: Insecta
- Order: Trichoptera
- Family: Phryganeidae
- Genus: Ptilostomis
- Species: P. angustipennis

Binomial name
- Ptilostomis angustipennis (Hagen, 1873)

Synonyms
- Neuronia angustipennis Hagen, 1873

Species of caddisfly

Ptilostomis angustipennis is a species of giant casemaker in the family Phryganeidae. It is found in North America.
