= Ptilostomis postica =

Scientific classification
- Kingdom: Animalia
- Phylum: Arthropoda
- Clade: Pancrustacea
- Class: Insecta
- Order: Trichoptera
- Family: Phryganeidae
- Genus: Ptilostomis
- Species: P. postica

Binomial name
- Ptilostomis postica (Walker, 1852)

Synonyms
- Neuronia postica Walker, 1852

Species of caddisfly

Ptilostomis postica is a species of giant casemaker in the family Phryganeidae. It is found in North America.
