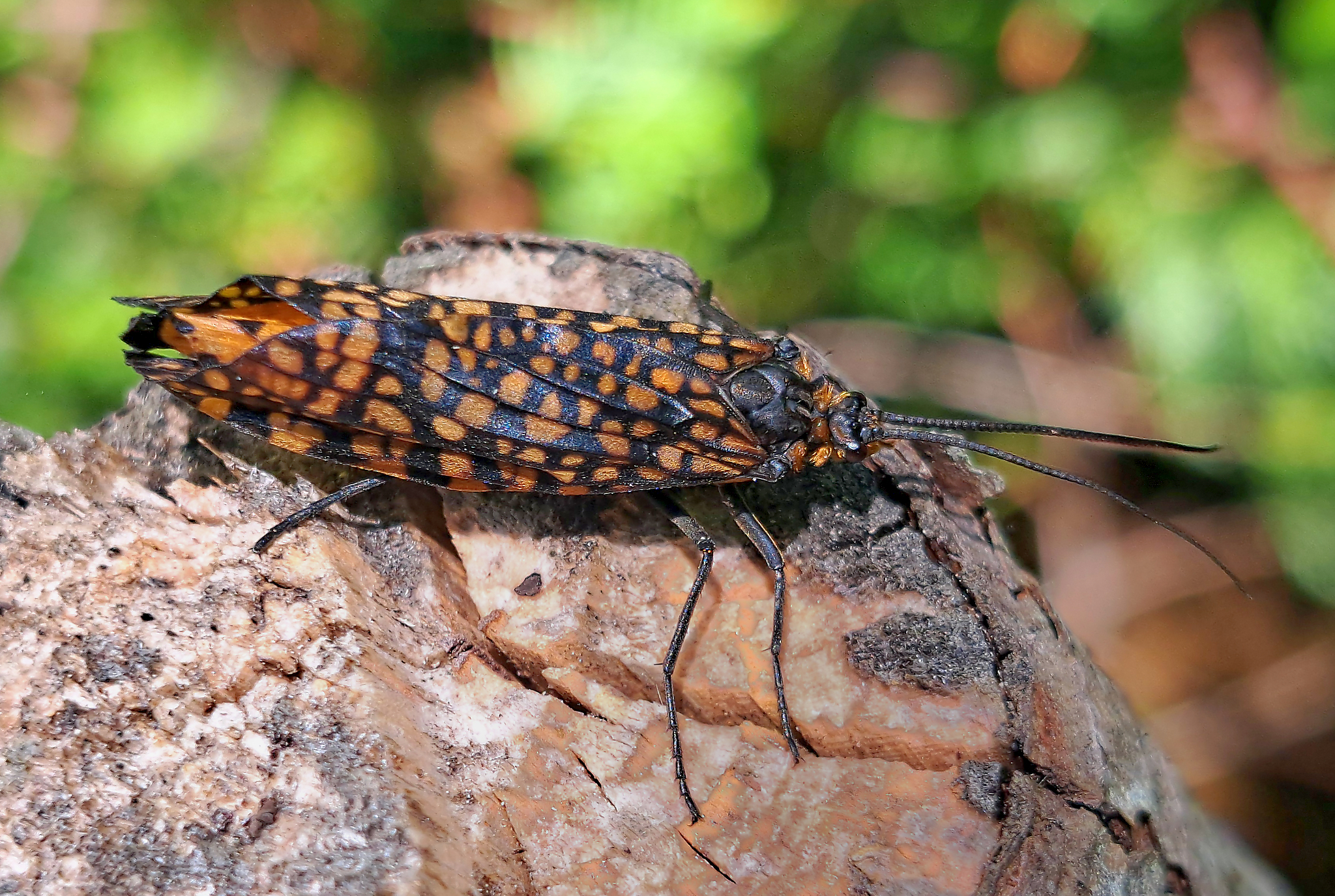

Scientific classification
- Kingdom: Animalia
- Phylum: Arthropoda
- Clade: Pancrustacea
- Class: Insecta
- Order: Trichoptera
- Family: Phryganeidae
- Genus: Oligostomis
- Species: O. pardalis

Binomial name
- Oligostomis pardalis (Walker, 1852)

= Oligostomis pardalis =

Species of caddisfly

Oligostomis pardalis is a species of giant casemaker in the family Phryganeidae. It is found in North America.

== Subspecies ==
These two subspecies belong to the species Oligostomis pardalis:

- Oligostomis pardalis pardalis
- Oligostomis pardalis redmani (Betten & Mosely, 1940)
