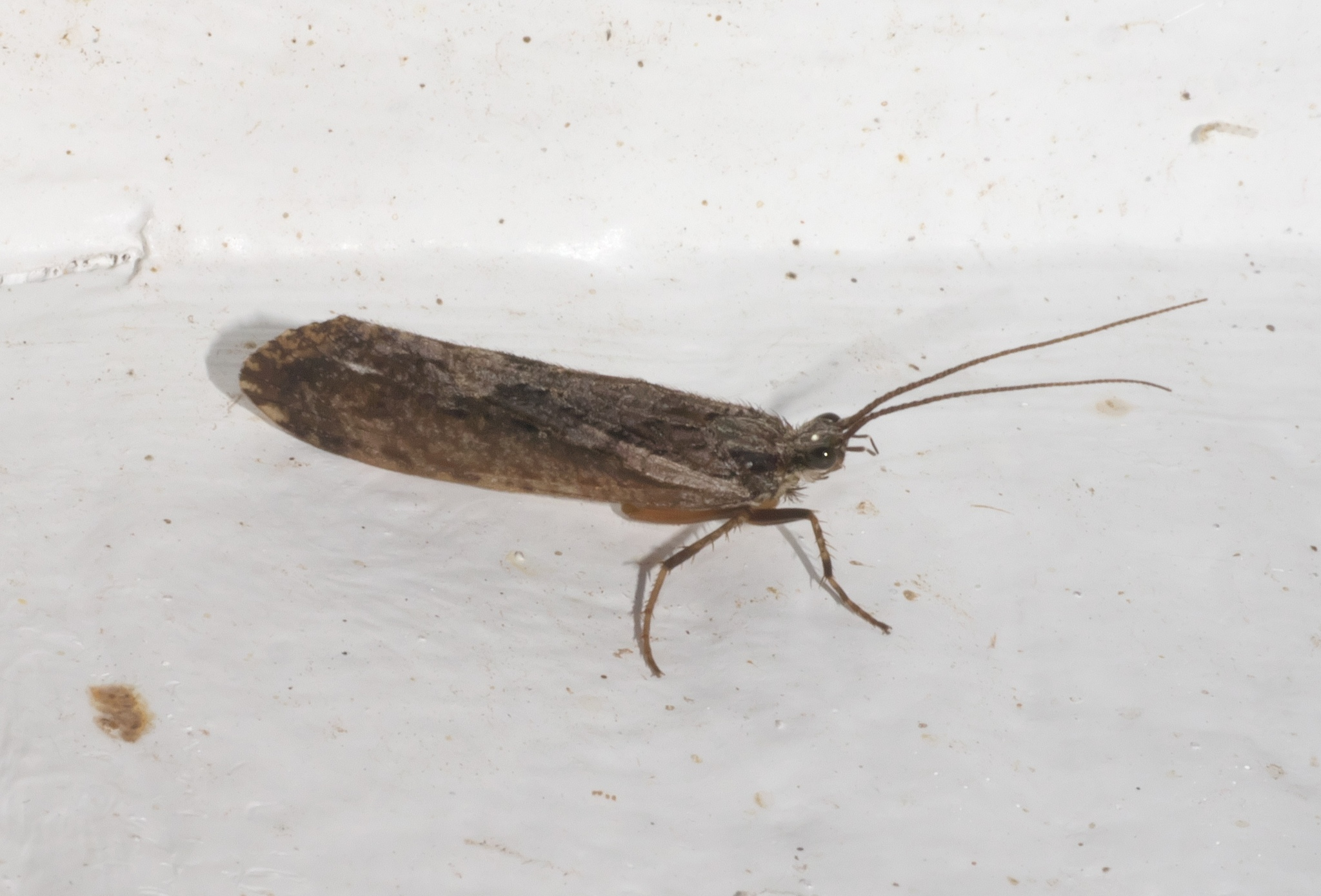
- Phryganea sayi, Oklahoma

Scientific classification
- Kingdom: Animalia
- Phylum: Arthropoda
- Clade: Pancrustacea
- Class: Insecta
- Order: Trichoptera
- Family: Phryganeidae
- Genus: Phryganea
- Species: P. sayi

Binomial name
- Phryganea sayi Milne, 1931

= Phryganea sayi =

Species of caddisfly

Phryganea sayi is a species of giant casemaker in the family Phryganeidae. It is found in North America.
