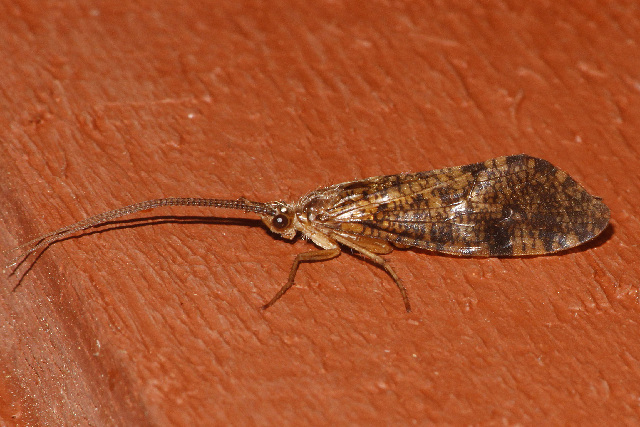

Scientific classification
- Kingdom: Animalia
- Phylum: Arthropoda
- Clade: Pancrustacea
- Class: Insecta
- Order: Trichoptera
- Family: Phryganeidae
- Genus: Banksiola
- Species: B. crotchi

Binomial name
- Banksiola crotchi Banks, 1944

Synonyms
- Banksiola selina Betten in Ross, 1944

= Banksiola crotchi =

Species of caddisfly

Banksiola crotchi, the traveler sedge giant casemaker, is a species of giant casemaker in the family Phryganeidae. It is found in North America.
