= Banksiola concatenata =

Scientific classification
- Kingdom: Animalia
- Phylum: Arthropoda
- Clade: Pancrustacea
- Class: Insecta
- Order: Trichoptera
- Family: Phryganeidae
- Genus: Banksiola
- Species: B. concatenata

Binomial name
- Banksiola concatenata (Walker, 1852)

Synonyms
- Neuronia concatenata Walker, 1852

Species of caddisfly

Banksiola concatenata is a species of caddisfly in the family Phryganeidae. It is found in North America.
