= Hagenella sibirica =

Scientific classification
- Kingdom: Animalia
- Phylum: Arthropoda
- Clade: Pancrustacea
- Class: Insecta
- Order: Trichoptera
- Family: Phryganeidae
- Genus: Hagenella
- Species: H. sibirica

Binomial name
- Hagenella sibirica Martynov, 1909

Species of insect

Hagenella sibirica is a species of insect first described by Vasilyevich Martynov in 1909. Hagenella sibirica is included in the genus Hagenella, and the family Phryganeidae.
