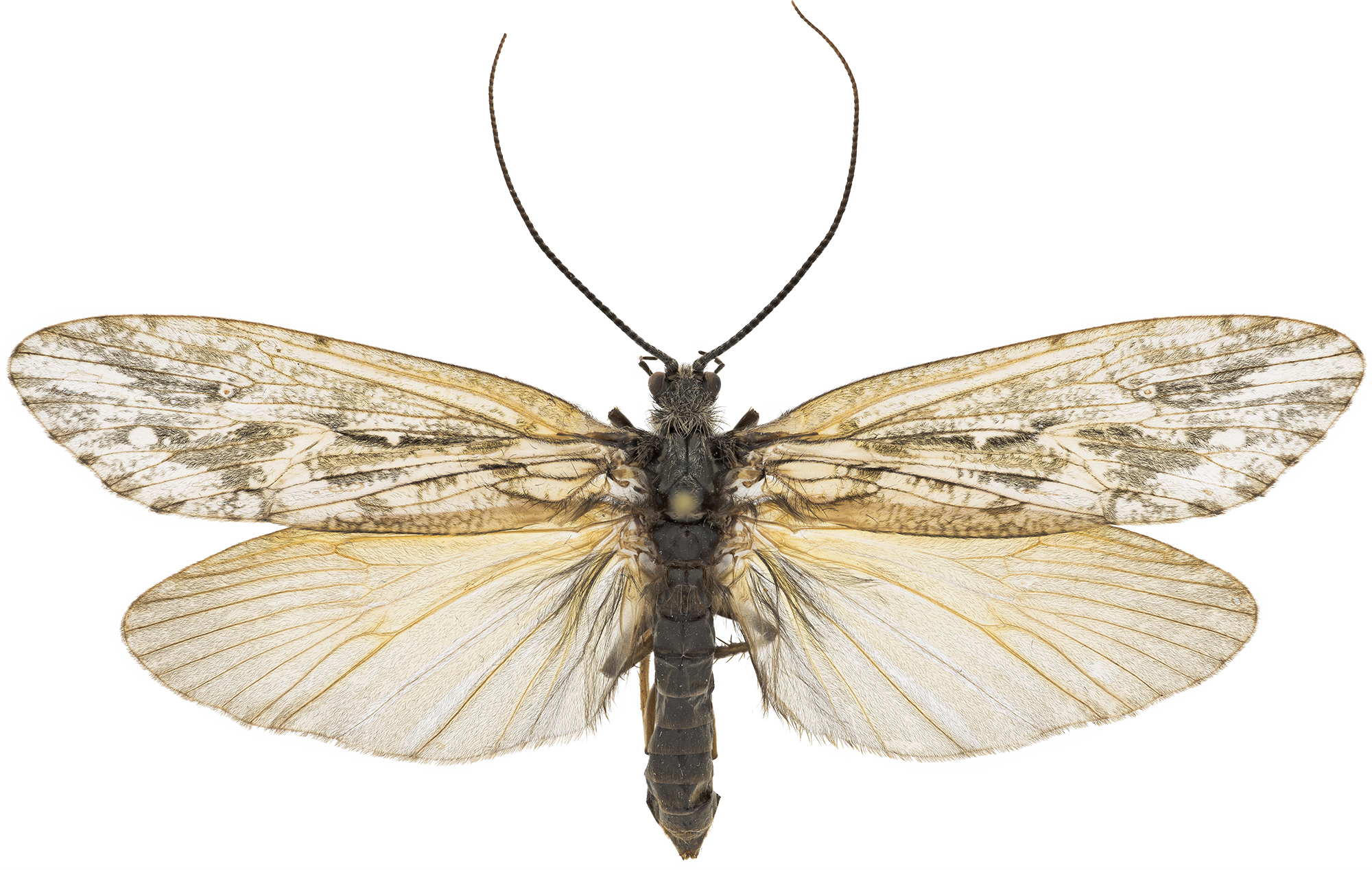
- Phryganea bipunctata

Scientific classification
- Kingdom: Animalia
- Phylum: Arthropoda
- Clade: Pancrustacea
- Class: Insecta
- Order: Trichoptera
- Family: Phryganeidae
- Subfamily: Phryganeinae
- Genus: Phryganea; Linnaeus, 1758

= Phryganea =

Genus of caddisflies

Phryganea is a genus of giant caddisflies in the family Phryganeidae. Species in the genus are found throughout the northern hemisphere (especially Europe and Asia), of which about 13 are found in N. America.

== Species ==
The Global Biodiversity Information Facility lists:

1. Phryganea albicornis Scopoli, 1763
2. Phryganea aquensis Heer, 1883
3. Phryganea arenifera Fritsch, 1910
4. Phryganea arkharica Sukacheva, 1982
5. Phryganea atomaria Gmelin, 1789
6. Phryganea bipunctata Retzius, 1783
7. Phryganea cinerea Walker, 1852
8. Phryganea dubia Pictet & Hagen, 1856
9. Phryganea egregia Ulmer, 1912
10. Phryganea elegans Piton, 1936
11. Phryganea elegantula Meunier, 1919
12. Phryganea filosa Linnæus, 1758
13. Phryganea flava Linnæus, 1758
14. Phryganea flavilatera Linnæus, 1758
15. Phryganea fossilis Pictet & Hagen, 1856
16. Phryganea grandis Linnaeus, 1758 - type species
17. Phryganea hyperborea Heer, 1883
18. Phryganea japonica McLachlan, 1866
19. Phryganea kryshtofovichi Cockerell, 1923
20. Phryganea labefacta Scudder, 1890
21. Phryganea latissima Ulmer, 1912
22. Phryganea lavrushini Cockerell, 1925
23. Phryganea lithophila Statz, 1936
24. Phryganea longirostris Hagen, 1856
25. Phryganea meunieri Statz, 1936
26. Phryganea miocenica Cockerell, 1913
27. Phryganea nattereri Brauer, 1873
28. Phryganea nigripennis Piton, 1940
29. Phryganea parschlugiana Heer, 1883
30. Phryganea picea (Pictet & Hagen, 1856)
31. Phryganea rotundata Ulmer, 1905
32. Phryganea sayi Milne, 1931
33. Phryganea sinensis McLachlan, 1862
34. Phryganea singularis Ulmer, 1912
35. Phryganea spec Linnæus, 1758
36. Phryganea spokanensis Carpenter, 1931
37. Phryganea submersa Statz, 1936
38. Phryganea ulmeri Meunier, 1918
39. Phryganea wickhami Cockerell, 1914
