= Myrmeleon mobilis =

Scientific classification
- Domain: Eukaryota
- Kingdom: Animalia
- Phylum: Arthropoda
- Class: Insecta
- Order: Neuroptera
- Family: Myrmeleontidae
- Genus: Myrmeleon
- Species: M. mobilis

Binomial name
- Myrmeleon mobilis Hagen, 1888

Species of insect

Myrmeleon mobilis is a species of antlion in the family Myrmeleontidae. It is found in North America.
