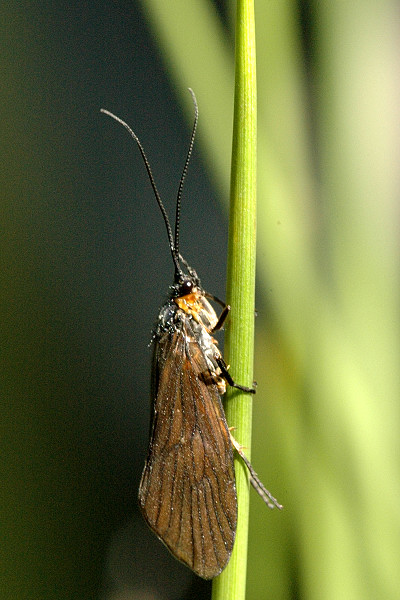
- O. striata

Scientific classification
- Kingdom: Animalia
- Phylum: Arthropoda
- Clade: Pancrustacea
- Class: Insecta
- Order: Trichoptera
- Family: Phryganeidae
- Subfamily: Phryganeinae
- Genus: Oligotricha; Rambur, 1842

= Oligotricha (insect) =

Genus of caddisflies

Oligotricha is a genus of giant casemakers in the family Phryganeidae. There are about eight described species in the genus Oligotricha.

== Species ==
- Oligotricha evanescens (Scudder, 1890)
- Oligotricha fulvipes (Matsumura, 1904)
- Oligotricha hybridoides Wiggins & Kuwayama, 1971
- Oligotricha kawamurai (Iwata, 1927)
- Oligotricha lapponica (Hagen, 1864)
- Oligotricha maxima (Iwata, 1927)
- Oligotricha spicata Wiggins & Kuwayama, 1957
- Oligotricha striata (Linnaeus, 1758)
