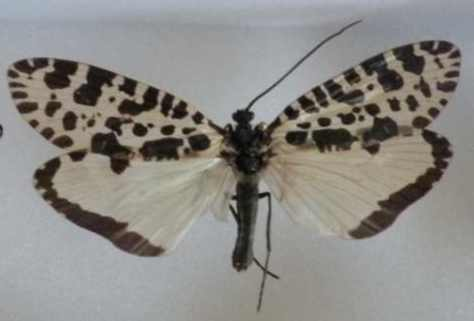
- Semblis phalaenoides

Scientific classification
- Kingdom: Animalia
- Phylum: Arthropoda
- Clade: Pancrustacea
- Class: Insecta
- Order: Trichoptera
- Family: Phryganeidae
- Genus: Semblis; Fabricius, 1775

= Semblis =

Genus of caddisflies

Semblis is a genus of insects belonging to the family Phryganeidae.

Species:

- Semblis atrata
- Semblis phalaenoides
