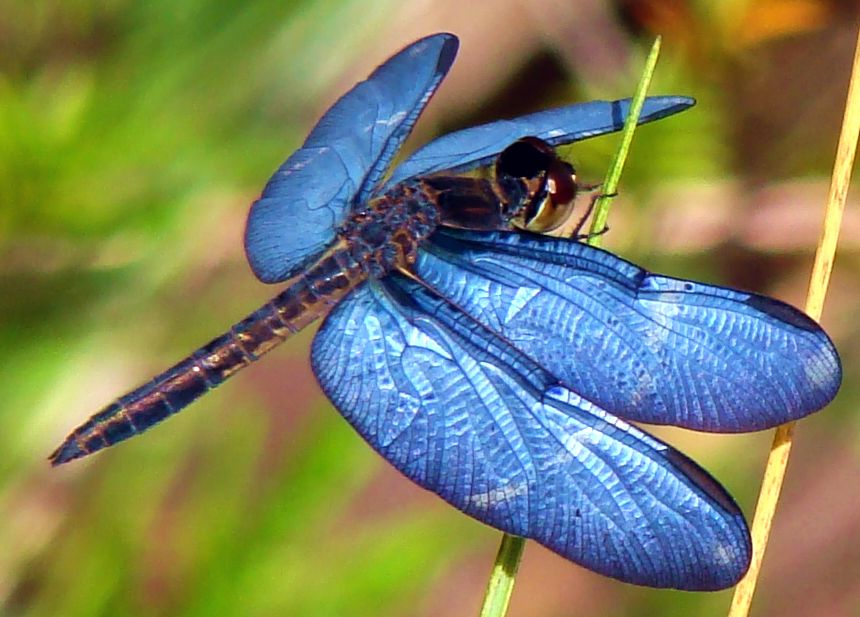
- Zenithoptera lanei

Scientific classification
- Kingdom: Animalia
- Phylum: Arthropoda
- Class: Insecta
- Order: Odonata
- Infraorder: Anisoptera
- Family: Libellulidae
- Subfamily: Palpopleurinae
- Genus: Zenithoptera; Sélys, 1869

= Zenithoptera =

Genus of dragonflies

Zenithoptera is a genus of dragonfly. They occur in Central America and northern South America. Their habitat is grassy marshes or clearings.

== Species ==
The genus contains the following species:

Male	Female	Scientific name	Common name	Distribution
		Zenithoptera anceps Pujol-Luz, 1993		Brasil
		Zenithoptera fasciata Linnaeus, 1758	Rainforest bluewing	Bolivia, Brazil, Colombia, Costa Rica, French Guiana, Guyana, Peru, Suriname, Trinidad and Tobago, and Venezuela
		Zenithoptera lanei Santos, 1941	Clearspot bluewing	Brazil
		Zenithoptera viola Ris, 1910	Viola bluewing	Brazil
