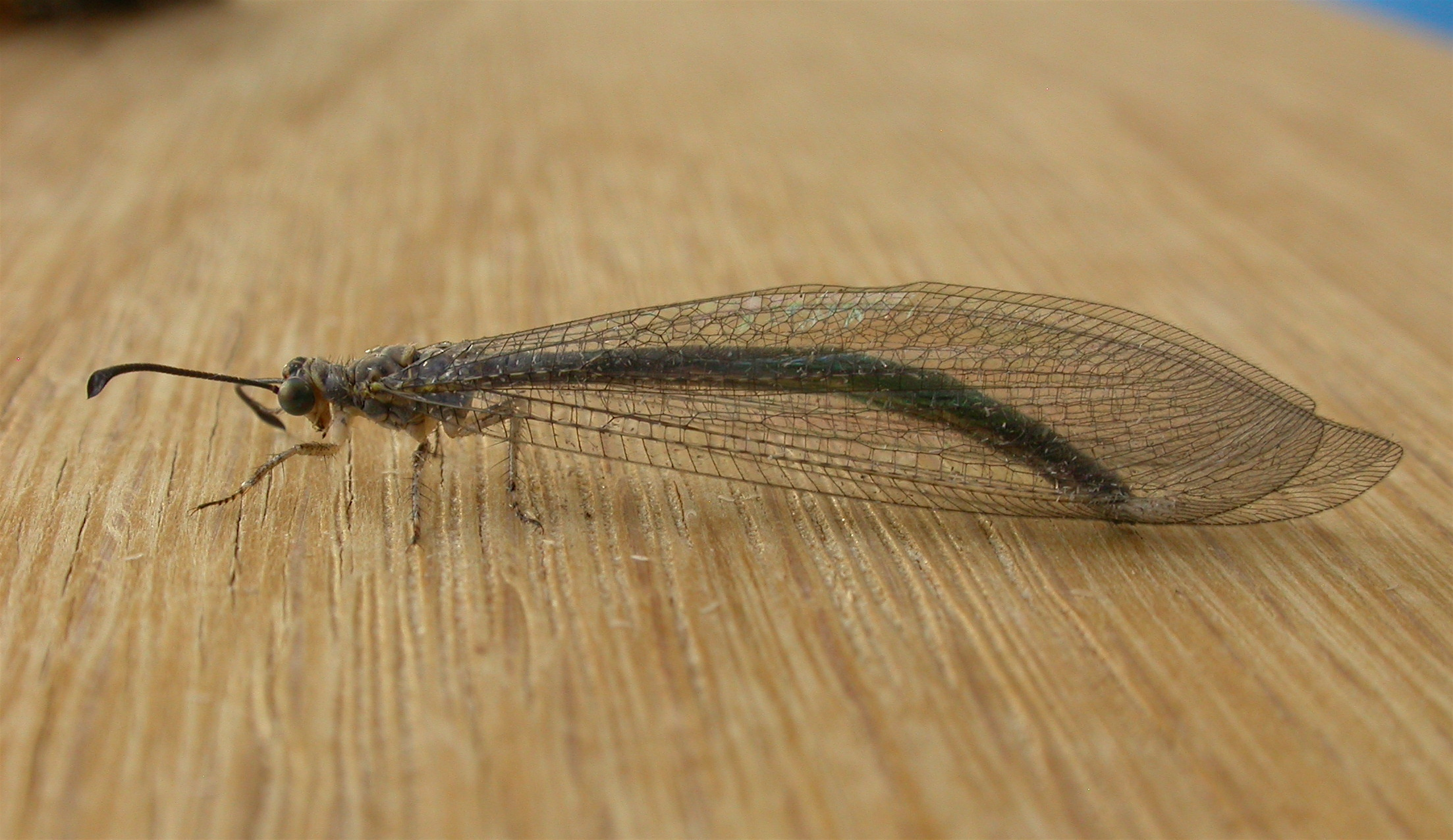
- Myrmeleon pictifrons

Scientific classification
- Kingdom: Animalia
- Phylum: Arthropoda
- Clade: Pancrustacea
- Class: Insecta
- Order: Neuroptera
- Family: Myrmeleontidae
- Subfamily: Myrmeleontinae
- Tribe: Myrmeleontini
- Genus: Myrmeleon; Linnaeus, 1767

Species
- See text

= Myrmeleon =

Genus of insects

Myrmeleon is an ant-lion genus in the subfamily Myrmeleontinae. Species in the genus feed on ants and some are themselves prey for the dune cricket Schizodactylus inexspectatus.

== Species ==
- Myrmeleon acer
- Myrmeleon albivenosus
- Myrmeleon alcestris
- Myrmeleon alluaudi
- Myrmeleon alternans
- Myrmeleon alticolus
- Myrmeleon ambiens
- Myrmeleon ambiguus
- Myrmeleon amicus
- Myrmeleon angustatus
- Myrmeleon angustipennis
- Myrmeleon argentinus
- Myrmeleon arizonicus
- Myrmeleon asper
- Myrmeleon assamensis
- Myrmeleon atlas
- Myrmeleon basutus
- Myrmeleon berenice
- Myrmeleon bimaculatus
- Myrmeleon bore
- Myrmeleon brachygaster
- Myrmeleon brasiliensis
- Myrmeleon buyssoni
- Myrmeleon californicus
- Myrmeleon caliginosus
- Myrmeleon caninus
- Myrmeleon capito
- Myrmeleon carolinus
- Myrmeleon catarractarus
- Myrmeleon cavipennis
- Myrmeleon celebensis
- Myrmeleon cephalicus
- Myrmeleon chappuisinus
- Myrmeleon chloropterus
- Myrmeleon circulis
- Myrmeleon circumcinctus
- Myrmeleon clothilde
- Myrmeleon coalitus
- Myrmeleon commoni
- Myrmeleon comptus
- Myrmeleon contractus
- Myrmeleon croceicollis
- Myrmeleon crudelis
- Myrmeleon dalloninus
- Myrmeleon dampfi
- Myrmeleon diminutus
- Myrmeleon dolosus
- Myrmeleon doralice
- Myrmeleon dorsomaculatus
- Myrmeleon elongatus
- Myrmeleon ermineus
- Myrmeleon exigus
- Myrmeleon exitialis
- Myrmeleon exsanguis
- Myrmeleon fasciatus
- Myrmeleon fischeri
- Myrmeleon formicarioides
- Myrmeleon formicarius
- Myrmeleon frontalis
- Myrmeleon fulgens
- Myrmeleon fulvescens
- Myrmeleon fulvinervis
- Myrmeleon furcatus
- Myrmeleon fuscus
- Myrmeleon gerlindae
- Myrmeleon giloloensis
- Myrmeleon guttatus
- Myrmeleon heppneri
- Myrmeleon homsi
- Myrmeleon houstoni
- Myrmeleon hyalinus
- Myrmeleon immaculatus
- Myrmeleon immanis
- Myrmeleon inanis
- Myrmeleon inconspicuus
- Myrmeleon indicus
- Myrmeleon insertus
- Myrmeleon insperatus
- Myrmeleon invisus
- Myrmeleon iridescens
- Myrmeleon januarius
- Myrmeleon javanensis
- Myrmeleon krempfi
- Myrmeleon labuanus
- Myrmeleon lacteostigma
- Myrmeleon laemargus
- Myrmeleon laetus
- Myrmeleon lagopus
- Myrmeleon lambkini
- Myrmeleon lanceolatus
- Myrmeleon leachii
- Myrmeleon lethifer
- Myrmeleon lineolus
- Myrmeleon littoralis
- Myrmeleon lynceus
- Myrmeleon maculaclypeus
- Myrmeleon madagascariensis
- Myrmeleon marginicollis
- Myrmeleon mcfarlandi
- Myrmeleon medialis
- Myrmeleon mediatus
- Myrmeleon melanurus
- Myrmeleon mendax
- Myrmeleon metuendus
- Myrmeleon mexicanus
- Myrmeleon mobilis
- Myrmeleon montanus
- Myrmeleon mouldsorum
- Myrmeleon nekkacus
- Myrmeleon neocaledonicus
- Myrmeleon niger
- Myrmeleon nigratus
- Myrmeleon nigritarsis
- Myrmeleon nigromarginatus
- Myrmeleon nigrurus
- Myrmeleon noacki
- Myrmeleon novaeguineae
- Myrmeleon obducens
- Myrmeleon oberthuri
- Myrmeleon obscurus
- Myrmeleon ochronevrus
- Myrmeleon orestes
- Myrmeleon paghmanus
- Myrmeleon pallescens
- Myrmeleon pallidipes
- Myrmeleon pallidus
- Myrmeleon palpalis
- Myrmeleon pellucidus
- Myrmeleon periculosus
- Myrmeleon persimilis
- Myrmeleon perspicuus
- Myrmeleon pertyi
- Myrmeleon philippinus
- Myrmeleon pictifrons
- Myrmeleon picturatus
- Myrmeleon pseudofasciatus
- Myrmeleon pseudohyalinus
- Myrmeleon punctatus
- Myrmeleon punctinervis
- Myrmeleon quinquemaculatus
- Myrmeleon regularis
- Myrmeleon rusticus
- Myrmeleon sagittarius
- Myrmeleon sanaanus
- Myrmeleon semigriseus
- Myrmeleon sexmaculatus
- Myrmeleon simplicissimus
- Myrmeleon sjostedti
- Myrmeleon solers
- Myrmeleon speciosus
- Myrmeleon sticticus
- Myrmeleon stigmalis
- Myrmeleon striatifrons
- Myrmeleon sumatrensis
- Myrmeleon taiwanensis
- Myrmeleon tenuipennis
- Myrmeleon territorius
- Myrmeleon texanus
- Myrmeleon tigrinus
- Myrmeleon timidus
- Myrmeleon torquatus
- Myrmeleon trifasciatus
- Myrmeleon trifolii
- Myrmeleon trigonois
- Myrmeleon trivialis
- Myrmeleon uniformis
- Myrmeleon uptoni
- Myrmeleon ursinus
- Myrmeleon valentini
- Myrmeleon validus
- Myrmeleon variegatus
- Myrmeleon viganus
- Myrmeleon viridis
- Myrmeleon vittatus
- Myrmeleon wangi
- Myrmeleon wismanni
- Myrmeleon wrighti
- Myrmeleon yemenicus
- Myrmeleon zanganus
- Myrmeleon zebidee

== See also ==
- Myrmecophagy
