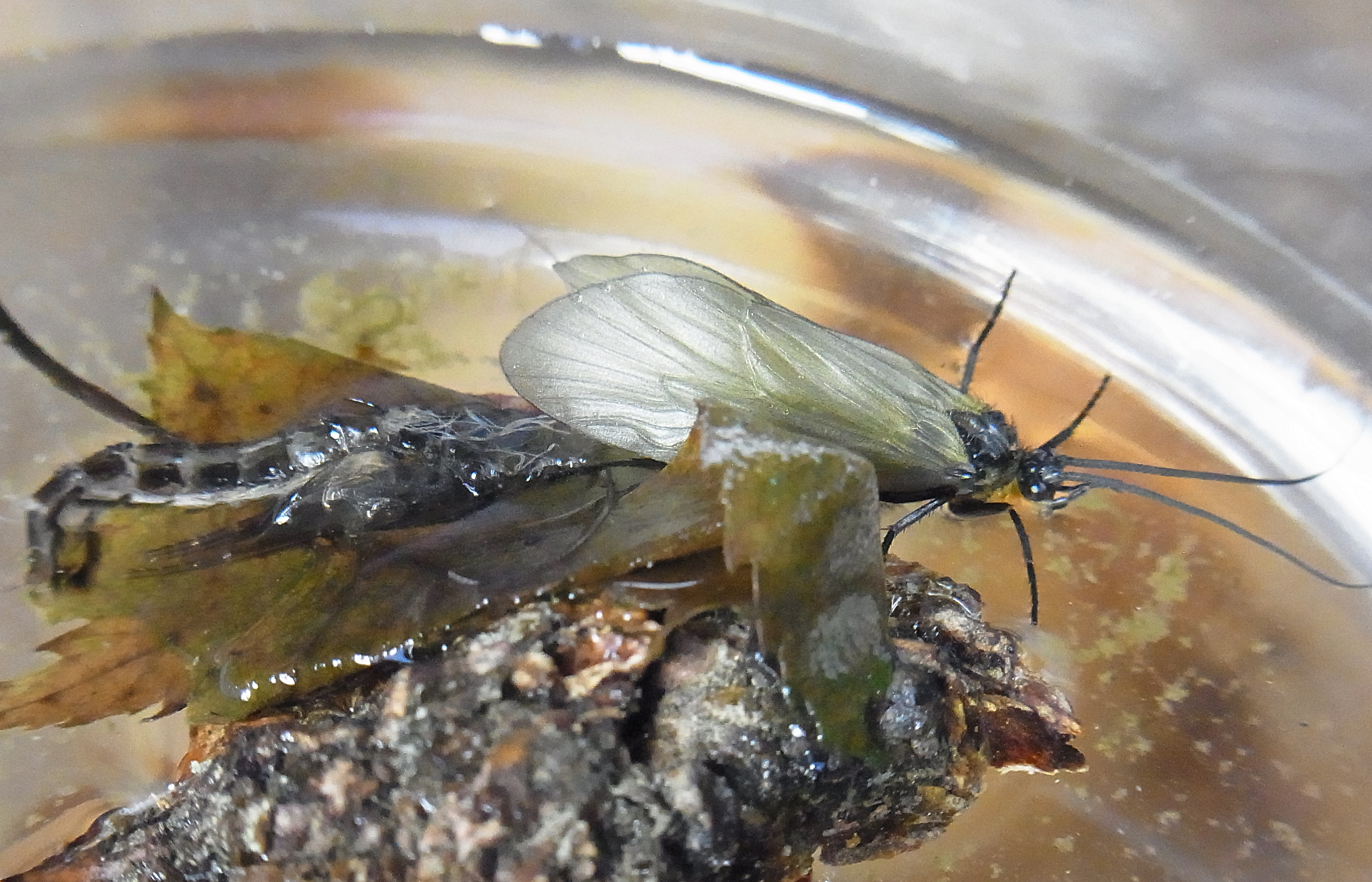

Scientific classification
- Kingdom: Animalia
- Phylum: Arthropoda
- Clade: Pancrustacea
- Class: Insecta
- Order: Trichoptera
- Family: Phryganeidae
- Genus: Oligotricha
- Species: O. striata

Binomial name
- Oligotricha striata (Linnaeus, 1758)

= Oligotricha striata =

Species of giant caddisflies

Oligotricha striata is species of insect that was discovered by a Swedish zoologist Linnaeus it can be found mostly in northern European.
