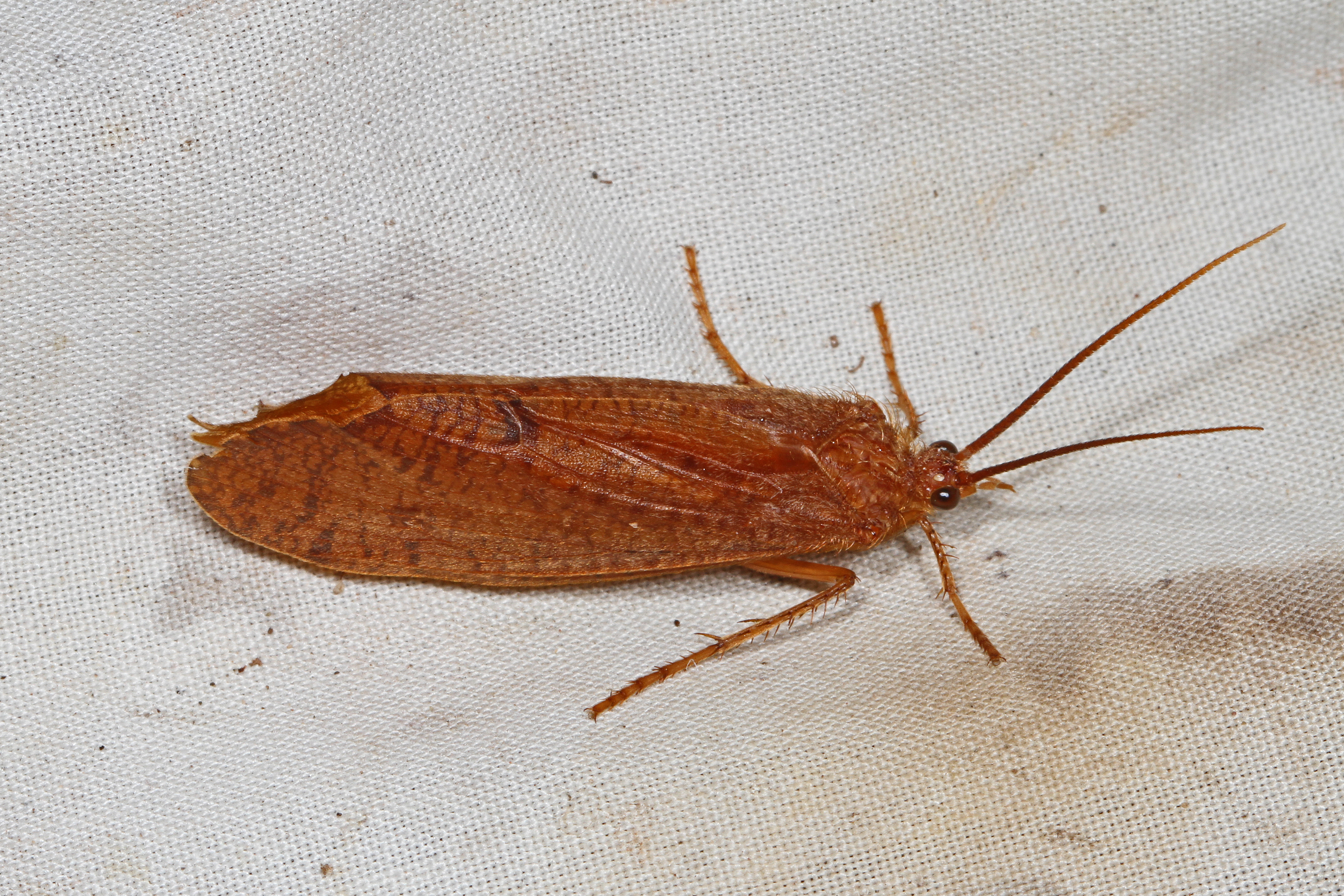

Scientific classification
- Kingdom: Animalia
- Phylum: Arthropoda
- Clade: Pancrustacea
- Class: Insecta
- Order: Trichoptera
- Family: Phryganeidae
- Genus: Ptilostomis; Kolenati, 1859

Subgenera
- Ptilostomis (Neuronella) Banks, 1951; Ptilostomis (Ptilostomis) Kolenati, 1859

= Ptilostomis =

Genus of caddisflies

Ptilostomis is a genus of giant casemakers in the family Phryganeidae. There are at least four described species in Ptilostomis.

== Species ==
These four species belong to the genus Ptilostomis:

- Ptilostomis angustipennis (Hagen, 1873)
- Ptilostomis ocellifera (Walker, 1852)
- Ptilostomis postica (Walker, 1852)
- Ptilostomis semifasciata (Say, 1828)
