= Hagenella =

Scientific classification
- Kingdom: Animalia
- Phylum: Arthropoda
- Clade: Pancrustacea
- Class: Insecta
- Order: Trichoptera
- Family: Phryganeidae
- Genus: Hagenella; Martynov, 1924

Genus of caddisflies

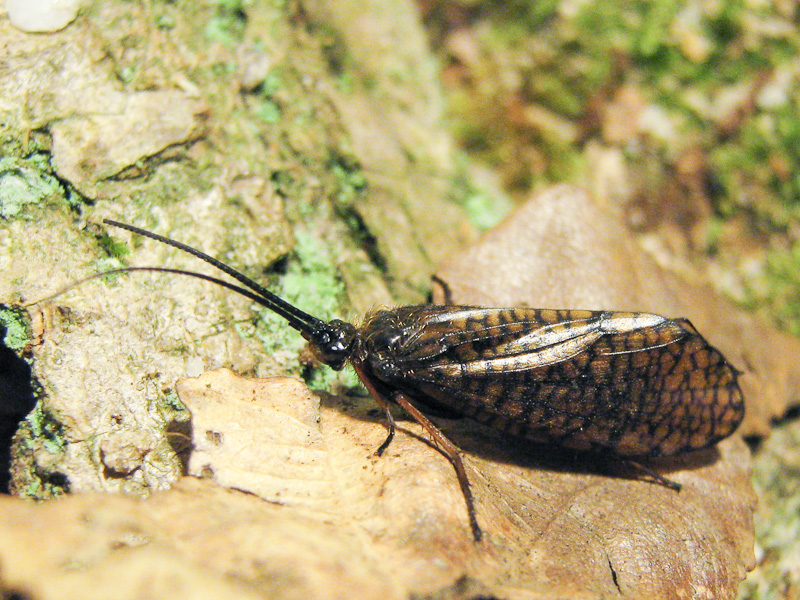

Hagenella is a genus of insects belonging to the family Phryganeidae.

The species of this genus are found in Europe, Easternmost Asia and Northern America.

Species:

- Hagenella apicalis (Matsumura, 1904)
- Hagenella canadensis (Banks, 1907)
- Hagenella clathrata (Kolenati, 1848)
- Hagenella sibirica (Martynov, 1909)
