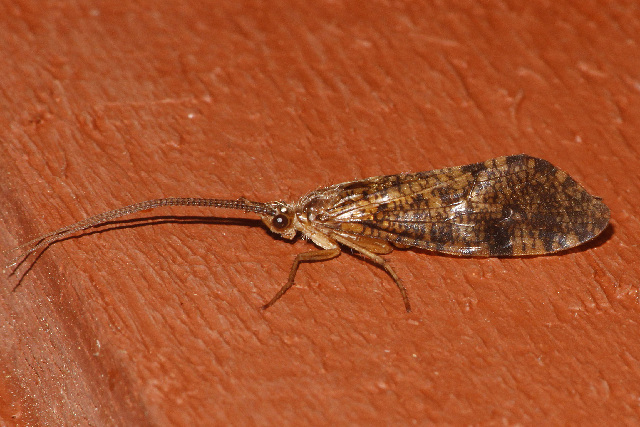
- Banksiola crotchi

Scientific classification
- Kingdom: Animalia
- Phylum: Arthropoda
- Clade: Pancrustacea
- Class: Insecta
- Order: Trichoptera
- Family: Phryganeidae
- Genus: Banksiola; Martynov, 1924

= Banksiola =

Genus of caddisflies

Banksiola is a genus of giant casemakers in the family Phryganeidae. There are about five described species in Banksiola.

== Species ==
These five species belong to the genus Banksiola:

- Banksiola calva Banks, 1943
- Banksiola concatenata (Walker, 1852)
- Banksiola crotchi Banks, 1944 (traveler sedge giant casemaker)
- Banksiola dossuaria (Say, 1828)
- Banksiola smithi (Banks, 1914)
