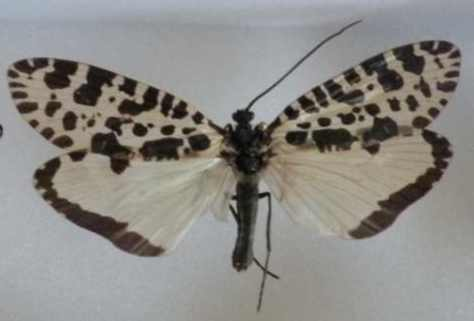

Scientific classification
- Kingdom: Animalia
- Phylum: Arthropoda
- Clade: Pancrustacea
- Class: Insecta
- Order: Trichoptera
- Family: Phryganeidae
- Genus: Semblis
- Species: S. phalaenoides

Binomial name
- Semblis phalaenoides (Linnaeus, 1758)

Synonyms
- Phryganea phalaenoides Linnaeus, 1758; Holostomis coreana Kuwayama, 1967; Phryganea daurica Waldheim, 1820; Phryganea speciosa Olivier, 1791

= Semblis phalaenoides =

Species of caddisfly

Semblis phalaenoides, the spotted caddis fly, is a species of caddisfly in the Phryganeidae family. It is found in Fennoscandia, Poland, the Baltic region, Belarus and Russia.

Larvae have been reared on freshly killed mosquitoes, flies and tiny juveniles of fish.
