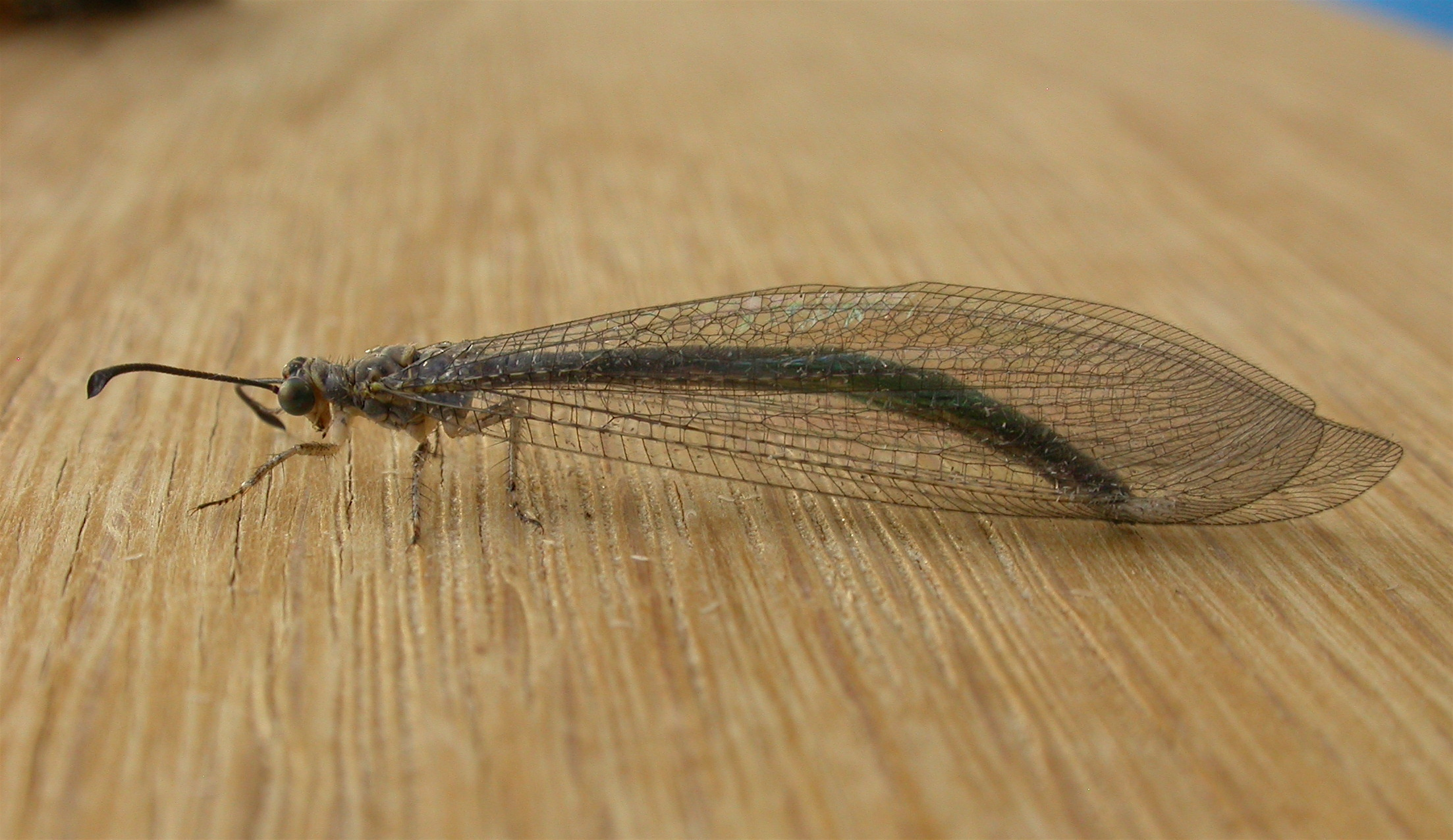

Scientific classification
- Domain: Eukaryota
- Kingdom: Animalia
- Phylum: Arthropoda
- Class: Insecta
- Order: Neuroptera
- Family: Myrmeleontidae
- Genus: Myrmeleon
- Species: M. pictifrons

Binomial name
- Myrmeleon pictifrons Gerstaecker, 1885

= Myrmeleon pictifrons =

Species of insect

Myrmeleon pictifrons is a species of antlion. It is native to the Australasian region and is one of over 2000 species of antlion that have been recorded globally.
