= Myrmeleon mexicanus =

Scientific classification
- Domain: Eukaryota
- Kingdom: Animalia
- Phylum: Arthropoda
- Class: Insecta
- Order: Neuroptera
- Family: Myrmeleontidae
- Genus: Myrmeleon
- Species: M. mexicanus

Binomial name
- Myrmeleon mexicanus Banks, 1903

Species of insect

Myrmeleon mexicanus is a species of antlion in the family Myrmeleontidae. It is found in Central America and North America.
