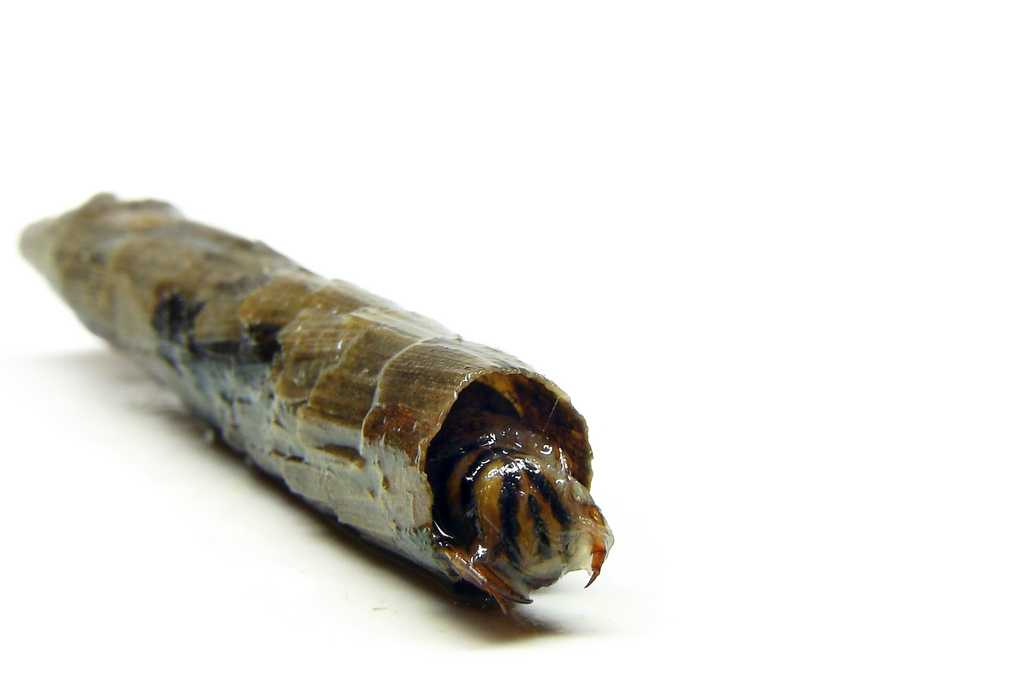

Scientific classification
- Kingdom: Animalia
- Phylum: Arthropoda
- Clade: Pancrustacea
- Class: Insecta
- Order: Trichoptera
- Family: Phryganeidae
- Genus: Fabria; Milne, 1934
- Species: F. inornata

Binomial name
- Fabria inornata Milne, 1934

= Fabria =

Genus of caddisflies

Fabria is a genus of giant casemakers in the caddisfly family Phryganeidae. There is one described species in Fabria, Fabria inornata. They are found in the United States and Canada.
