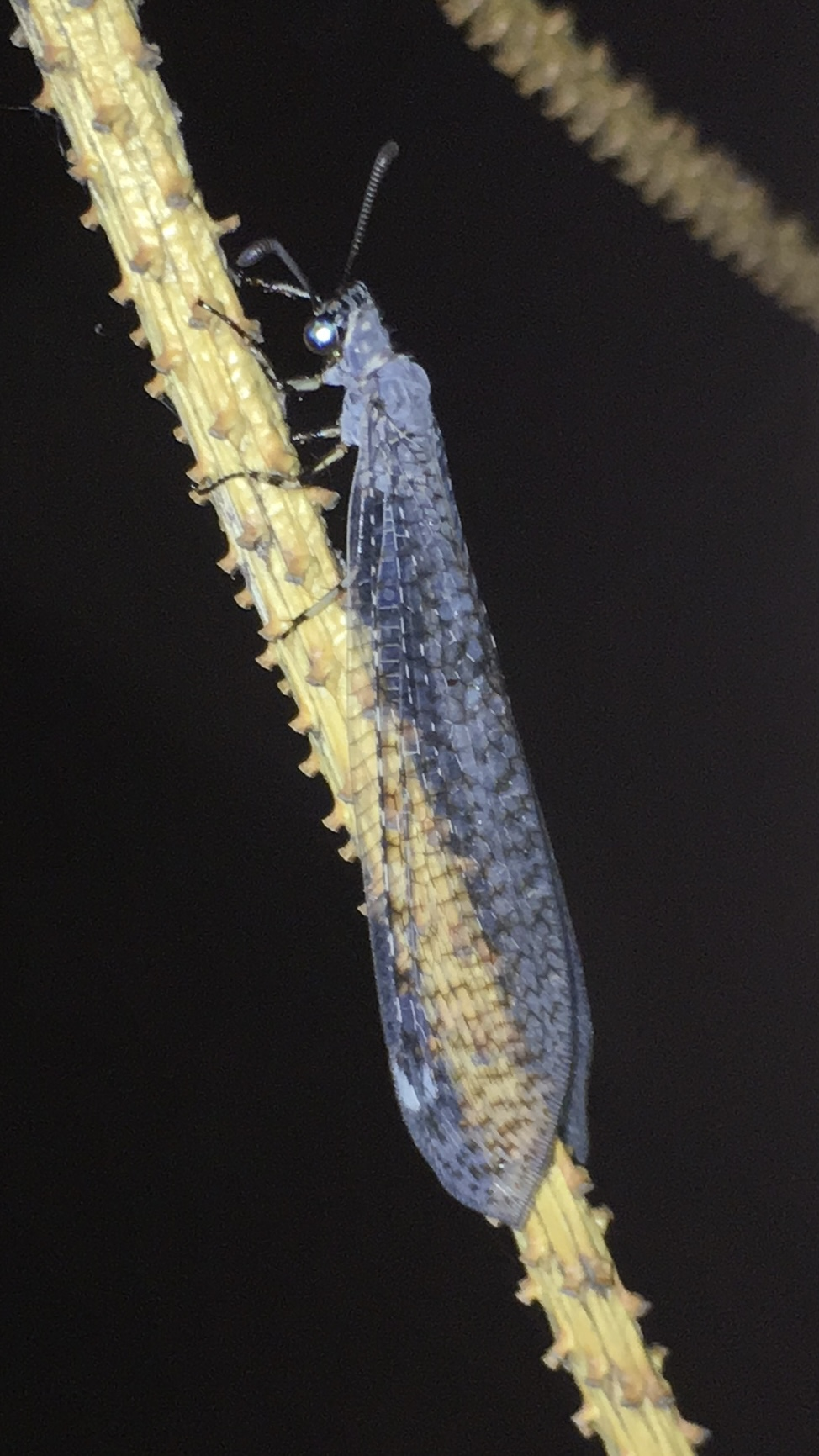

Scientific classification
- Kingdom: Animalia
- Phylum: Arthropoda
- Class: Insecta
- Order: Neuroptera
- Family: Myrmeleontidae
- Genus: Myrmeleon
- Species: M. exitialis

Binomial name
- Myrmeleon exitialis Walker, 1853

= Myrmeleon exitialis =

Species of insect

Myrmeleon exitialis is a species of antlion in the family Myrmeleontidae. It is found in North America.
