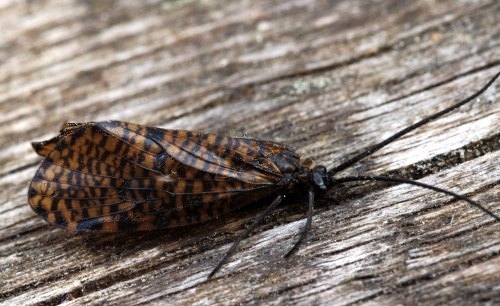
- Oligostomis reticulata

Scientific classification
- Kingdom: Animalia
- Phylum: Arthropoda
- Clade: Pancrustacea
- Class: Insecta
- Order: Trichoptera
- Family: Phryganeidae
- Genus: Oligostomis; Kolenati, 1848

= Oligostomis =

Genus of caddisflies

Oligostomis is a genus of giant casemakers in the family Phryganeidae. There are at least four described species in Oligostomis.

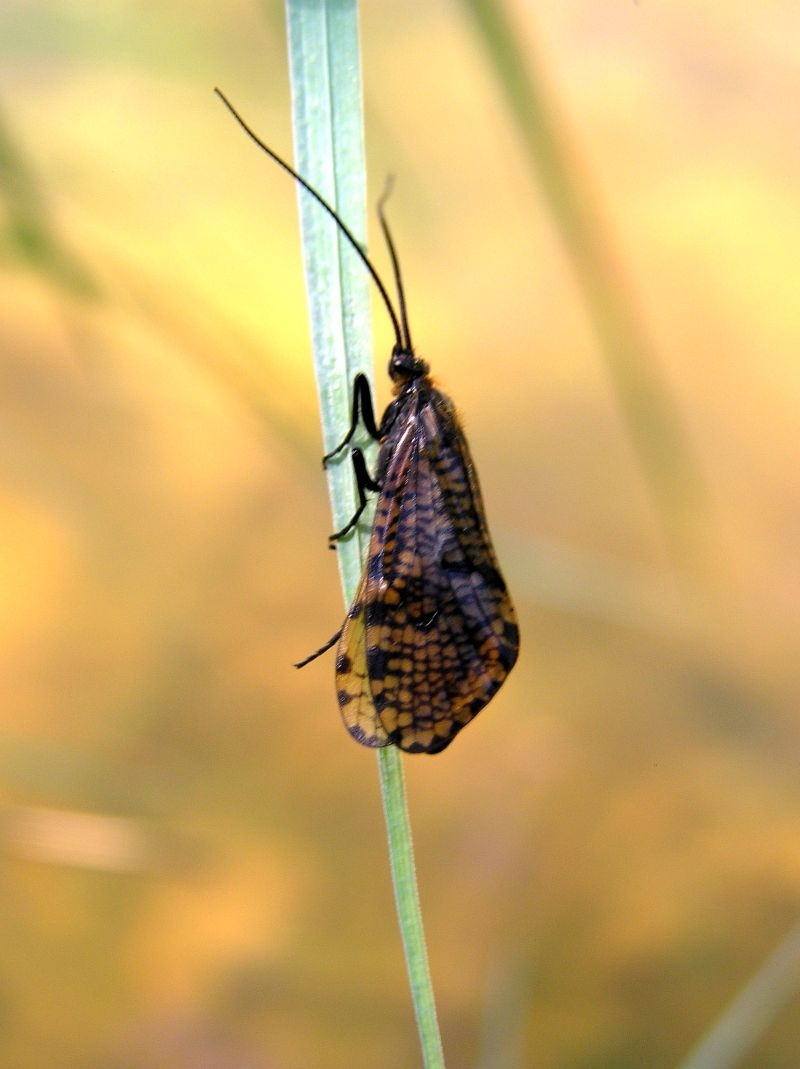
Oligostomis reticulata

== Species ==
These four species belong to the genus Oligostomis:

- Oligostomis ocelligera (Walker, 1852)
- Oligostomis pardalis (Walker, 1852)
- Oligostomis reticulata (Linnaeus, 1761)
- Oligostomis soochowica (Ulmer, 1932)
