= Agrypnetes =

Scientific classification
- Kingdom: Animalia
- Phylum: Arthropoda
- Clade: Pancrustacea
- Class: Insecta
- Order: Trichoptera
- Family: Phryganeidae
- Genus: Agrypnetes; McLachlan, 1876
- Species: A. crassicornis

Binomial name
- Agrypnetes crassicornis McLachlan, 1876

Genus of caddisflies

Agrypnetes is a monotypic genus of caddisflies belonging to the family Phryganeidae. The only species is Agrypnetes crassicornis.

The species was described by McLachlan in 1876.

It is native to Northern Europe.
