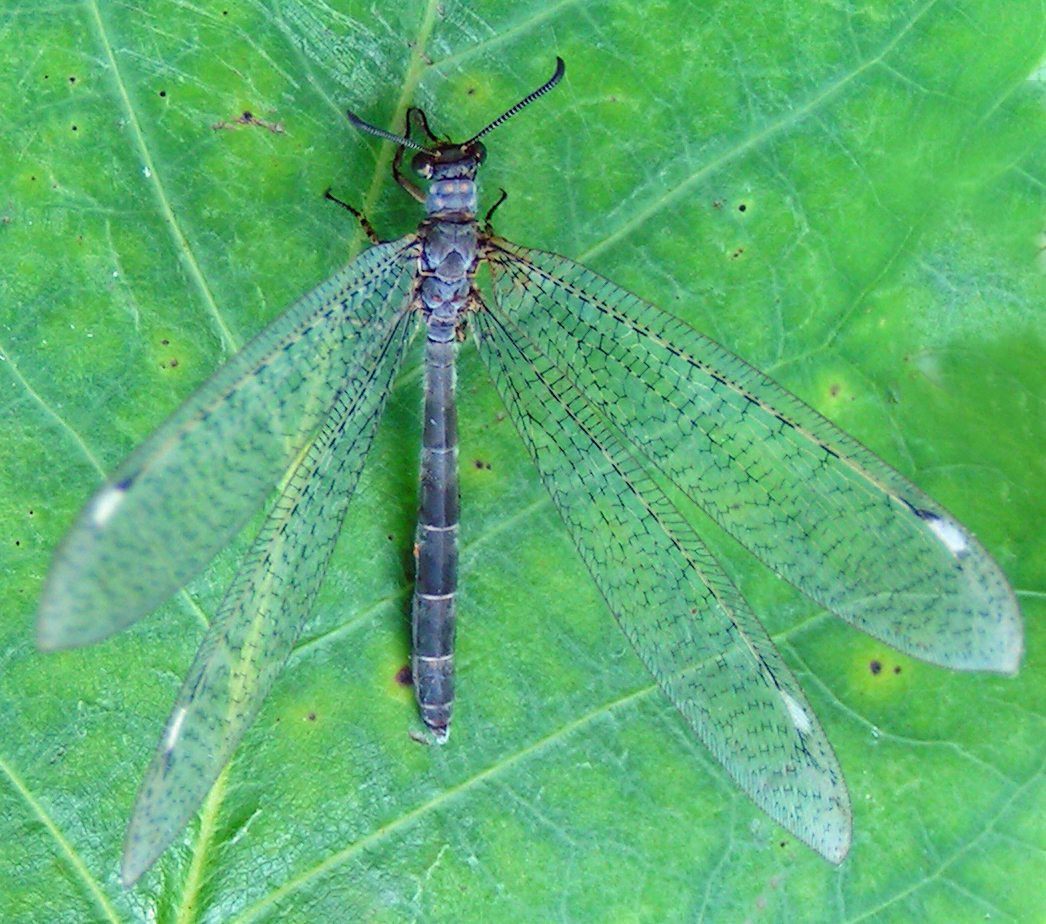
- Female photographed in Ontario
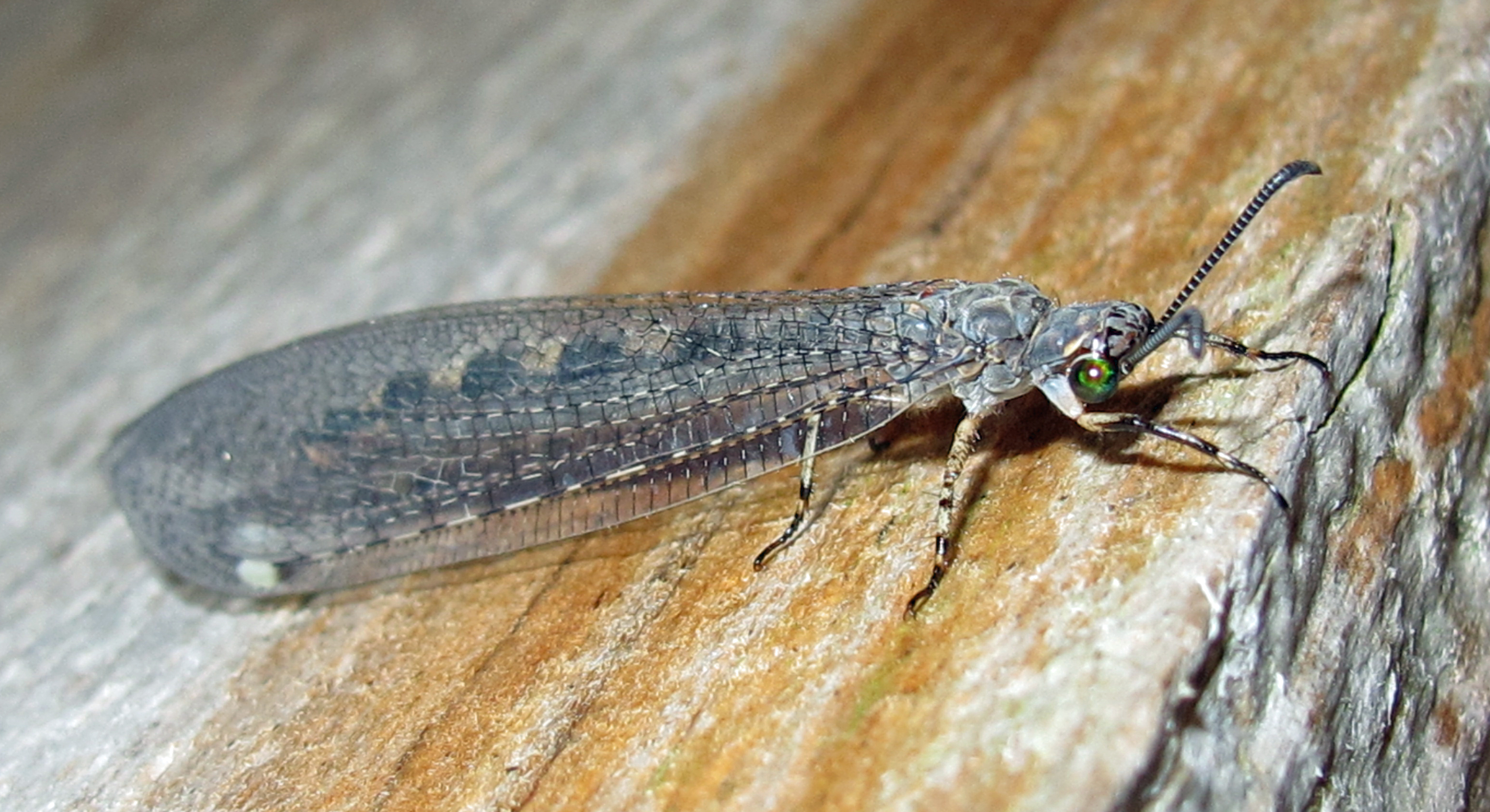
- Male photographed in Ontario

Scientific classification
- Domain: Eukaryota
- Kingdom: Animalia
- Phylum: Arthropoda
- Class: Insecta
- Order: Neuroptera
- Family: Myrmeleontidae
- Genus: Myrmeleon
- Species: M. immaculatus

Binomial name
- Myrmeleon immaculatus De Geer, 1773

= Myrmeleon immaculatus =

Species of insect

Myrmeleon immaculatus is a species of pit-trapping antlion in the family Myrmeleontidae. It is found in Central America and North America and is a particularly common species in the eastern United States.This species is usually a blue-grey color and the adults are 30mm long.
