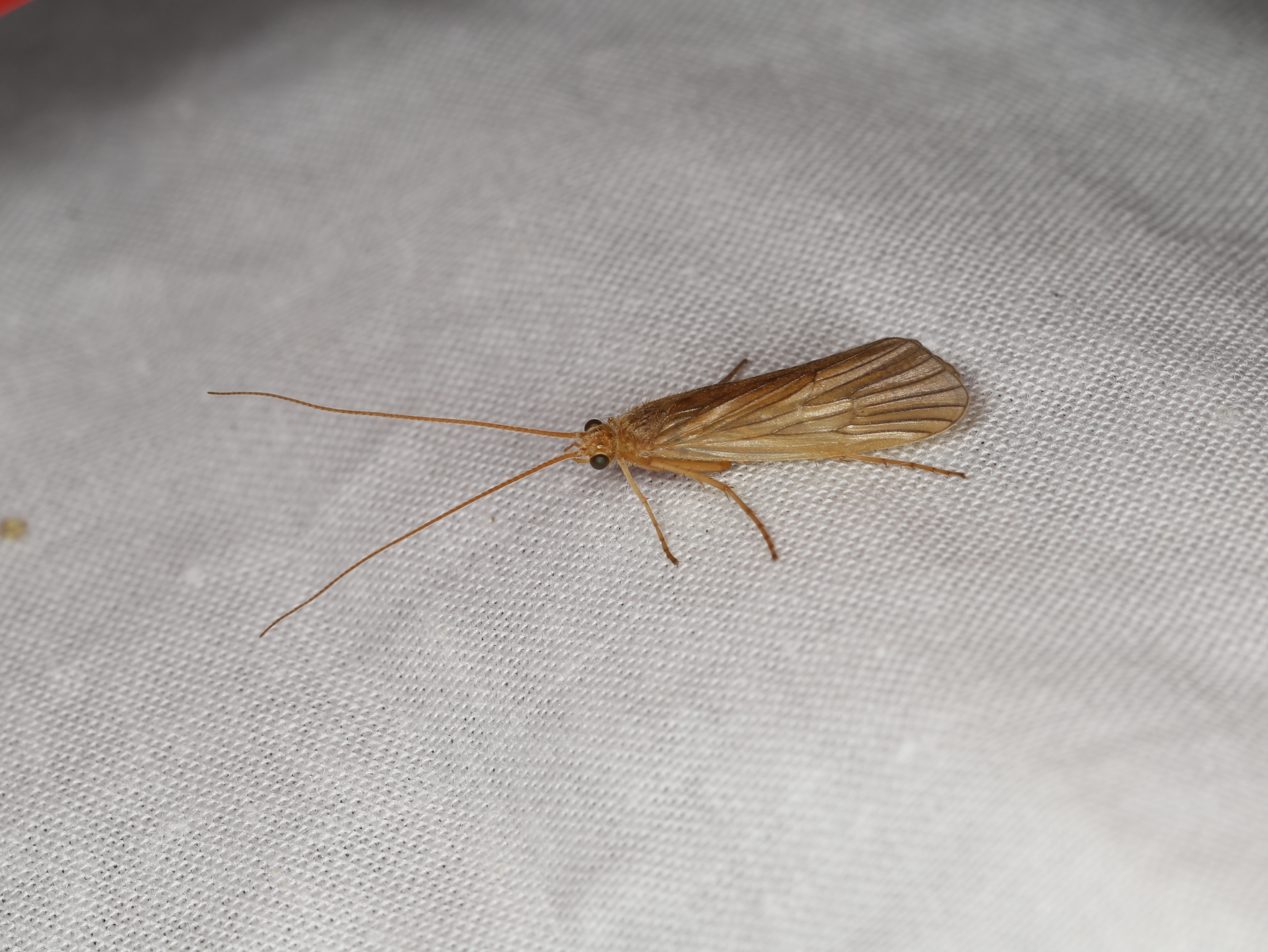

Scientific classification
- Kingdom: Animalia
- Phylum: Arthropoda
- Clade: Pancrustacea
- Class: Insecta
- Order: Trichoptera
- Family: Phryganeidae
- Genus: Agrypnia; Curtis, 1835

= Agrypnia (caddisfly) =

Genus of caddisflies

Agrypnia is a genus of giant caddisflies in the family Phryganeidae. There are about 19 described species in Agrypnia.

The type species for Agrypnia is Agrypnia pagetana J. Curtis.

== Species ==
These 19 species belong to the genus Agrypnia:

- Agrypnia acristata Wiggins, 1998^{i c g}
- Agrypnia colorata (Hagen, 1873)^{i c g}
- Agrypnia czerskyi (Martynov, 1924)^{i c g}
- Agrypnia deflata (Milne, 1931)^{i c g}
- Agrypnia glacialis Hagen, 1873^{i c g b}
- Agrypnia improba (Hagen, 1873)^{i c g}
- Agrypnia incurvata Wiggins, 1998^{i c g}
- Agrypnia legendrei (Navas, 1923)^{i c g}
- Agrypnia macdunnoughi (Milne, 1931)^{i c g b}
- Agrypnia obsoleta (Hagen, 1864)^{i c g}
- Agrypnia pagetana Curtis, 1835^{i c g}
- Agrypnia picta Kolenati, 1848^{i c g}
- Agrypnia principalis (Martynov, 1909)^{g}
- Agrypnia sahlbergi (McLachlan, 1880)^{i c g}
- Agrypnia sordida (McLachlan, 1871)^{i c g}
- Agrypnia straminea Hagen, 1873^{i c g}
- Agrypnia ulmeri (Martynov, 1909)^{i c g}
- Agrypnia varia (Fabricius, 1793)^{i c g}
- Agrypnia vestita (Walker, 1852)^{i c g b}

Data sources: i = ITIS, c = Catalogue of Life, g = GBIF, b = Bugguide.net
