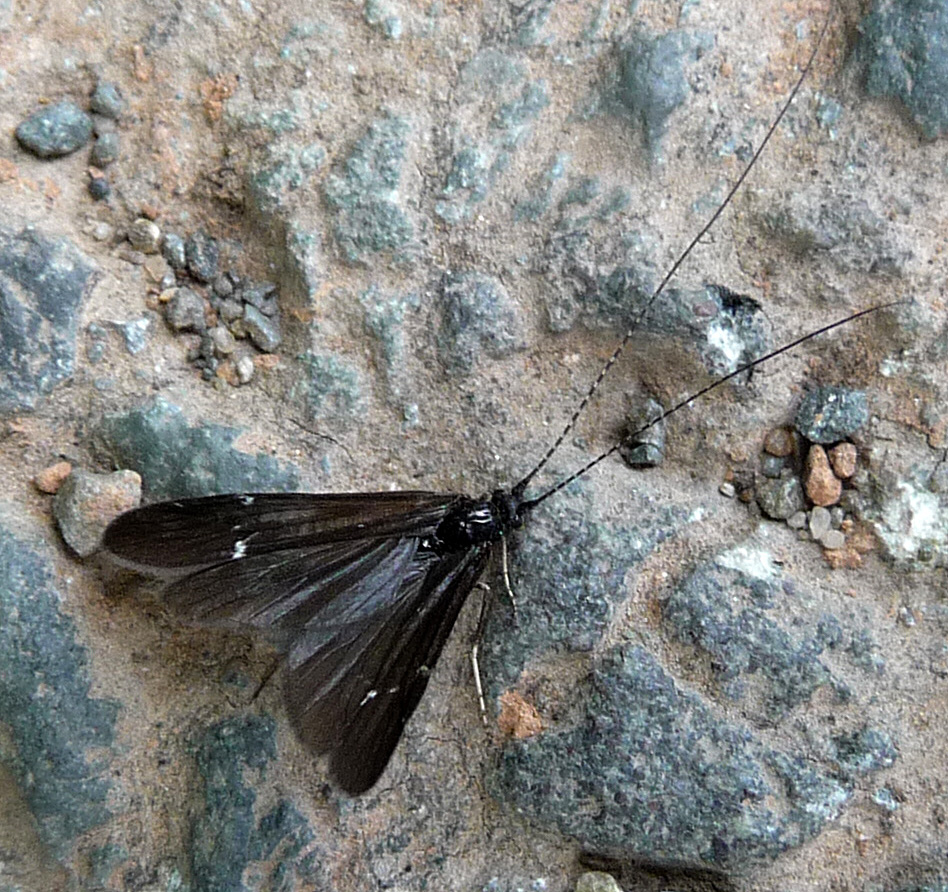

Scientific classification
- Kingdom: Animalia
- Phylum: Arthropoda
- Clade: Pancrustacea
- Class: Insecta
- Order: Trichoptera
- Family: Leptoceridae
- Genus: Athripsodes
- Species: A. bilineatus

Binomial name
- Athripsodes bilineatus (Linnaeus, 1758)

= Athripsodes bilineatus =

Species of caddisfly

Athripsodes bilineatus is a species of caddisfly belonging to the family Leptoceridae.

It is native to Europe.
