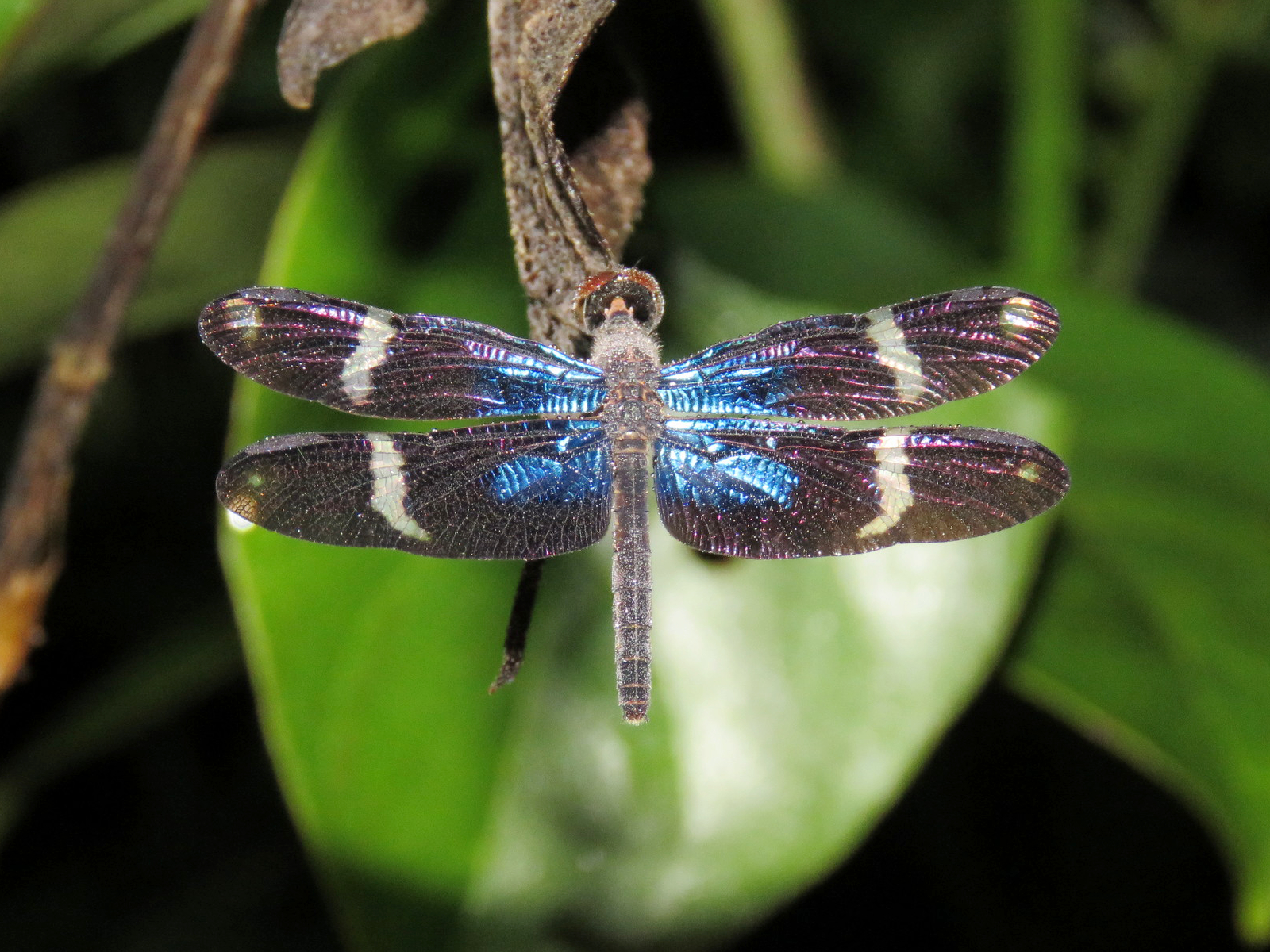

Scientific classification
- Kingdom: Animalia
- Phylum: Arthropoda
- Clade: Pancrustacea
- Class: Insecta
- Order: Odonata
- Infraorder: Anisoptera
- Superfamily: Libelluloidea
- Family: Libellulidae
- Genus: Zenithoptera
- Species: Z. fasciata

Binomial name
- Zenithoptera fasciata (L.)

= Zenithoptera fasciata =

Species of dragonfly

Zenithoptera fasciata, also known as the rainforest bluewing, is a species of dragonfly native to much of the northern half of South America, as well as southern portions of Central America. The species has in the past been known by additional taxonomic names, including: Libellula fasciata, Libellula americana, and Libellula violacea.

== Taxonomy ==
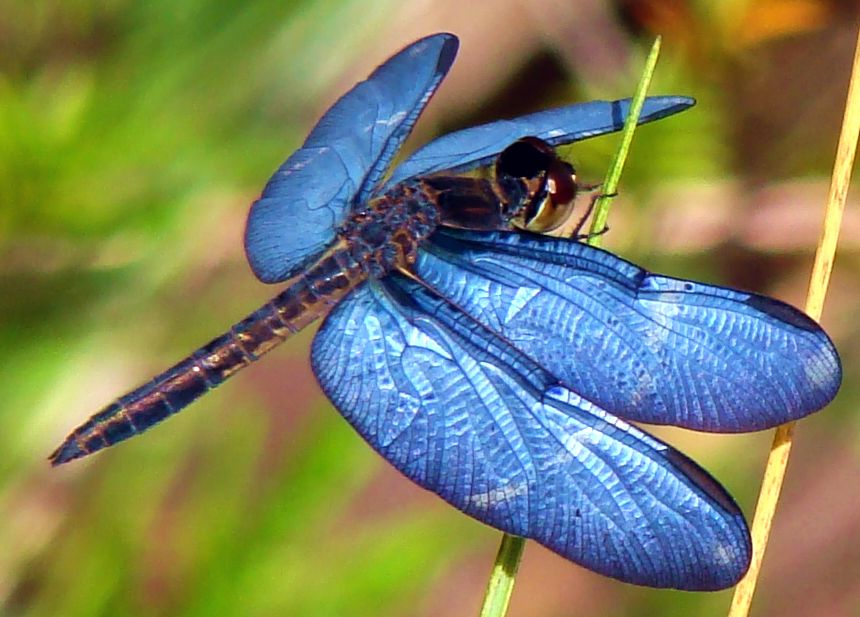
Clearspot bluewing (Zenithoptera lanei)

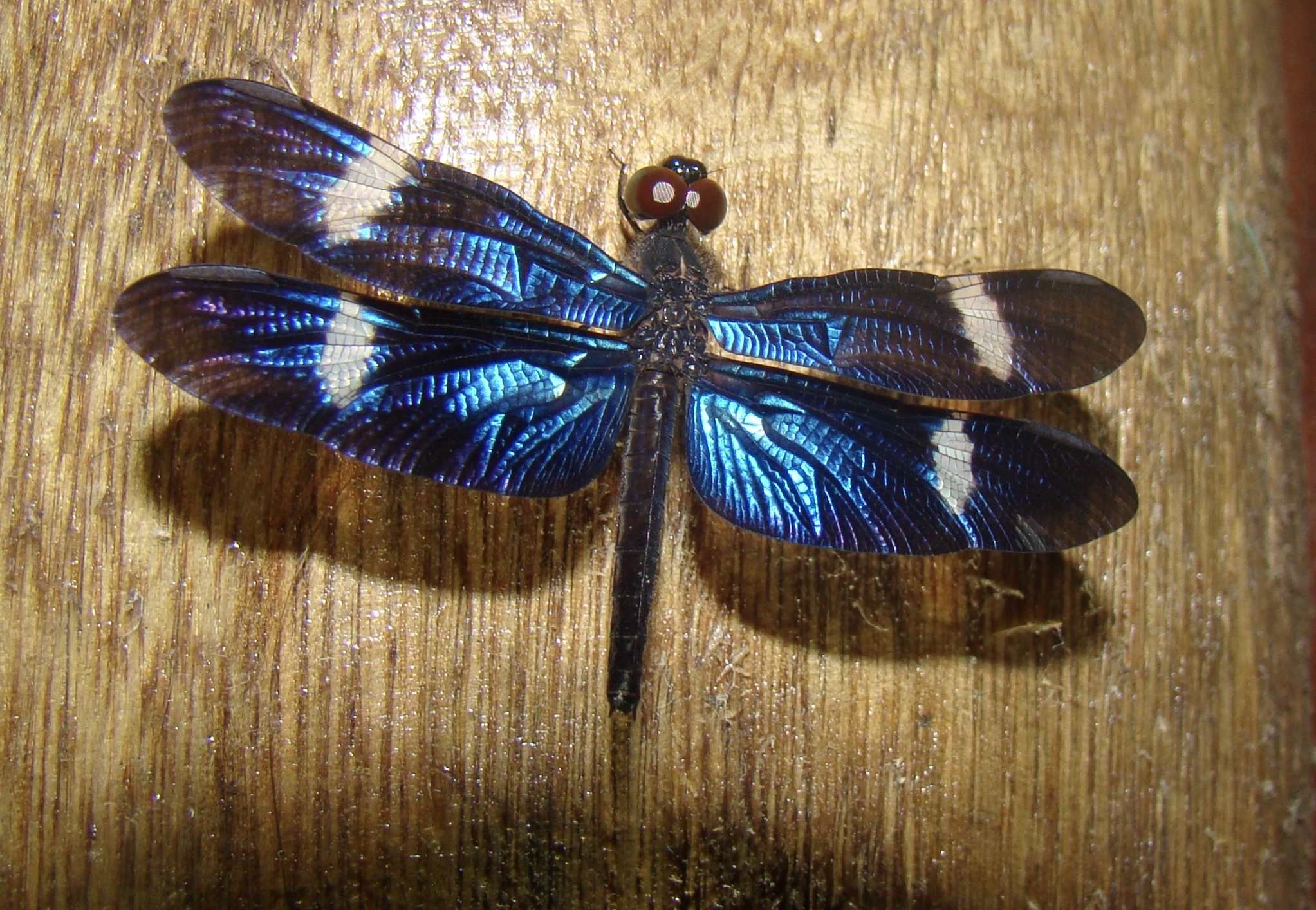
Rainforest bluewing (Zenithoptera fasciata)

The closely related Z. lanei shares a similar range and appearance to Z. fasciata; Z. lanei can be distinguished however by its more iridescent wings, which are relatively unbroken by contrasting patterns.

Zenithoptera fasciata is one of four known extant species of the genus Zenithoptera, the others being Zenithoptera anceps, Zenithoptera viola, and Zenithoptera lanei ("clearspot bluewing"), with a significant overlap in range between the species. Z. fasciata and Z. lanei share a particularly close morphology, both having blue wings; lanei's wings, however, tend to be paler blue and with distinctive dots, from which the species derives its common name, near the apex, and more lateral markings on the wings than are typically seen in fasciata.

== Physiology and morphology ==
As reflected by its common name, Z. fasciata is easily distinguished by its vibrant iridescent blue wings. The wings are almost uniform in color, but sometimes display a lighter band just near short of the apex (this band is much more universal in the closely related Z. lanei). The lateral surface of the thorax is a dark brown color with narrow, irregular yellowish bands. Two broad, light markings appear on the underside of the male thorax. A lighter band often runs from the anterior margin to the posterior margin. The abdomen is dark brown, again often with yellow narrow bands along the posterior margins of the segments. The larva of the species have not been described.

== Ecology and behaviour ==
Zenithoptera fasciata live in tropical and subtropical forests and rainforests, as well as wetlands. Adults spend a majority of their time in the forest canopy, generally only coming down to lower areas for shorter periods, generally in the midday sun and often only long enough for quick breeding encounters. When below the canopy, they are frequently at rest at shallow pools overgrown with low grasses and sedges, and in less crowded areas of forest, where they perch on high ground or on tall slender twigs. When perched, wings are typically held erect above the body, occasionally brought down suddenly to a deflected position.

== Range ==
The species is estimated to have a range exceeding 1,638,000 square kilometers, having been observed from Costa Rica south through Brazil and Peru and covering a significant portion of the Amazonian Basin. The species has been recorded as a native to Bolivia, Brazil, Colombia, Costa Rica, French Guiana, Guyana, Peru, Suriname, Trinidad and Tobago, and Venezuela.
