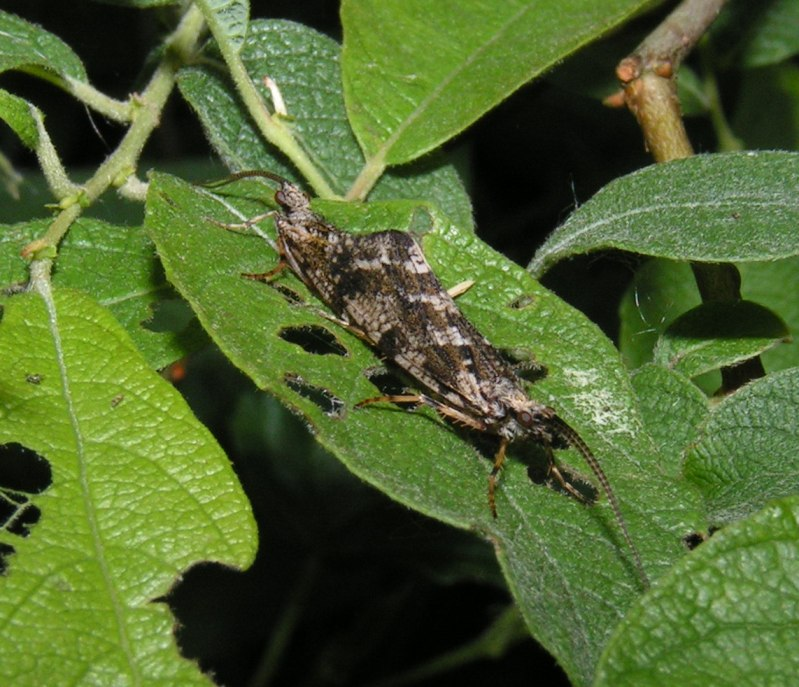
- Trichostegia minor

Scientific classification
- Kingdom: Animalia
- Phylum: Arthropoda
- Clade: Pancrustacea
- Class: Insecta
- Order: Trichoptera
- Family: Phryganeidae
- Genus: Trichostegia; Kolenati, 1848

= Trichostegia (caddisfly) =

Genus of caddisflies

Trichostegia is a genus of insects belonging to the family Phryganeidae.

The species of this genus are found in Europe and Northern America.

Species:

- Trichostegia minor (Curtis, 1834)
