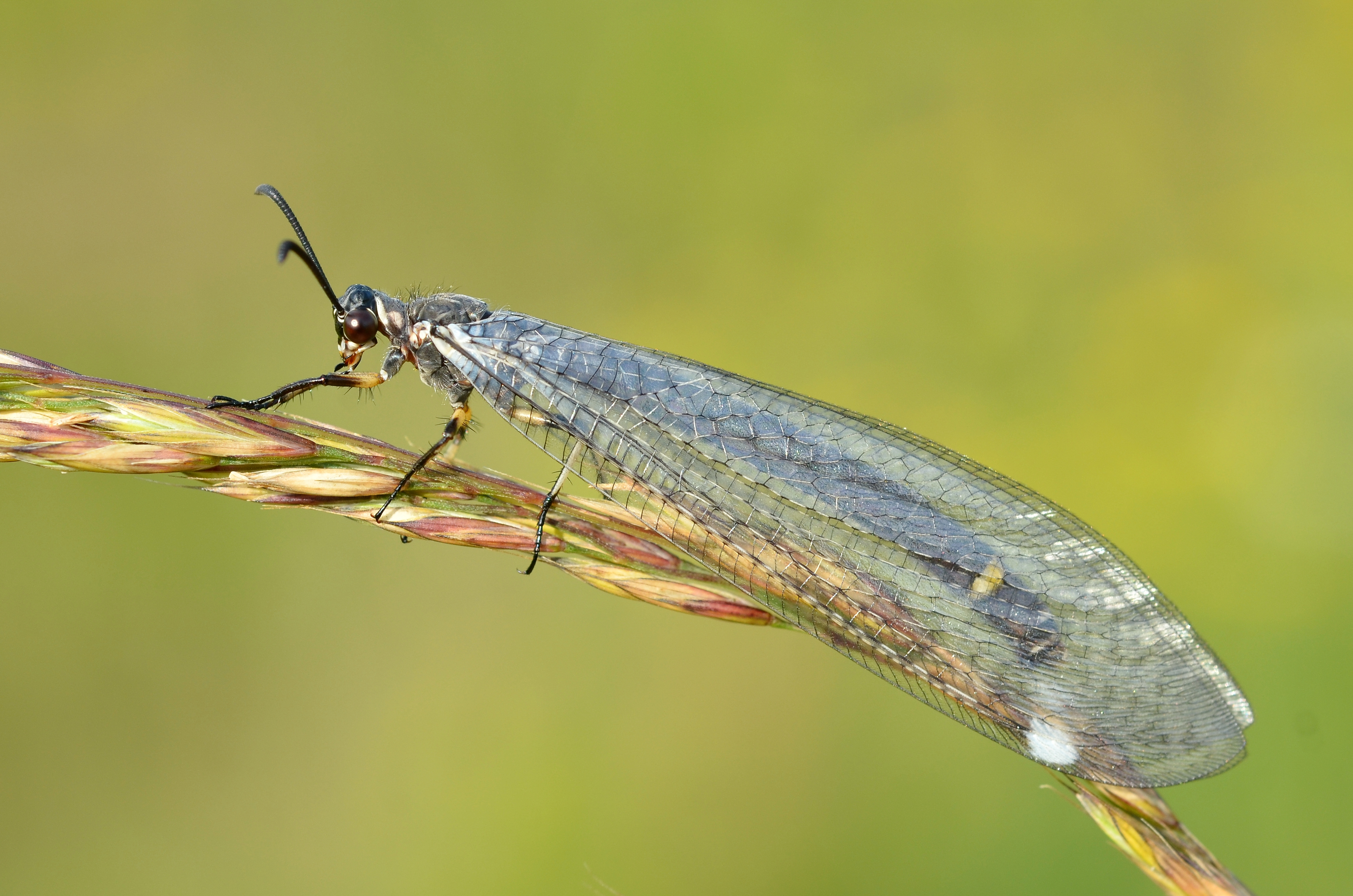

Scientific classification
- Domain: Eukaryota
- Kingdom: Animalia
- Phylum: Arthropoda
- Class: Insecta
- Order: Neuroptera
- Family: Myrmeleontidae
- Genus: Myrmeleon
- Species: M. formicarius

Binomial name
- Myrmeleon formicarius Linnaeus, 1767

= Myrmeleon formicarius =

Species of antlion

Myrmeleon formicarius is a species of antlion native to Belgium and other parts of Europe. It is known to be present in the Genk nature reserve Opglabbekerzavel in 2020, according to the species inventory prepared for the city by the ecological study/advice company Mieco-effect.

According to the European Environment Agency, this species has not yet been assessed by the IUCN and as such lacks an official conservation threat status. Despite there being little species-specific information available online, the Encyclopædia Britannica describes it as "the best known of the 65 described species" of antlions.

It has been suggested that there is a great deal of confusion in the distinction of individuals between M. formicarius and Euroleon nostras. The easiest hallmark of M. formicarius larvae is its largely black head, but this can easily be mis-seen due to fine humus/substrate particles clinging to their many head hairs. For adults, the lack of black flecks in their wing colours is an identifying feature.

A 2020 study by Wu et al., sequenced their mitochondrial genome and found that they are most closely related to Myrmeleon immanis, another antlion species.

The common name of M. formicarius in Dutch is Zwartkopmierenleeuw, which translates to "Blackhead antlion".
