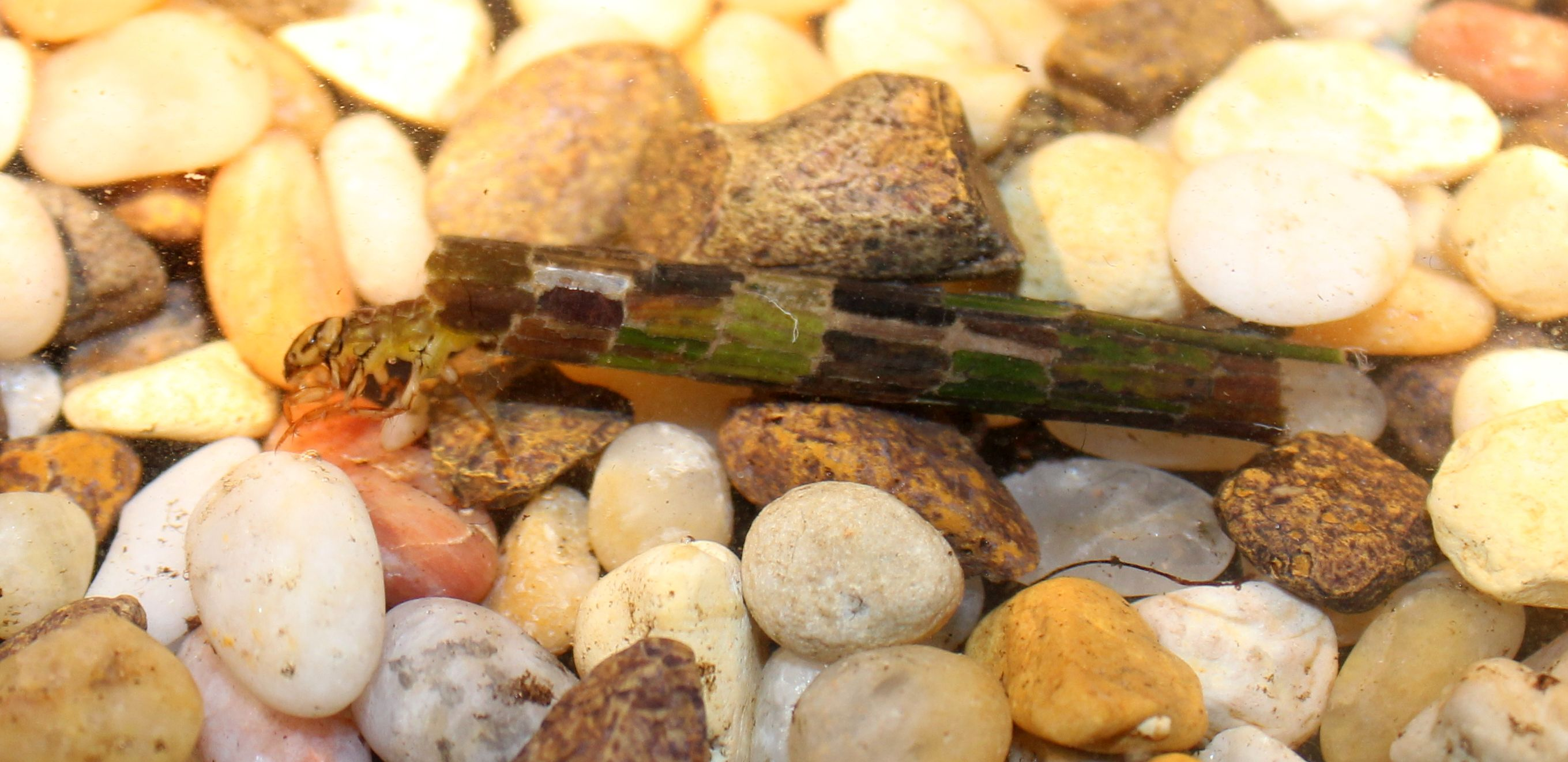
- Phryganeidae larva

Scientific classification
- Kingdom: Animalia
- Phylum: Arthropoda
- Clade: Pancrustacea
- Class: Insecta
- Order: Trichoptera
- Superfamily: Phryganeoidea
- Family: Phryganeidae; Leach, 1815

= Phryganeidae =

Family of caddisflies

Phryganeidae is a family of giant caddisflies in the order Trichoptera. There are at least 80 described species in Phryganeidae.

== Genera ==
The majority of genera are in the subfamily Phryganeinae and the type genus is Phryganea C. Linnaeus, 1758.

- Agrypnetes McLachlan, 1876
- Agrypnia Curtis, 1835
- Banksiola Martynov, 1924
- Beothukus Wiggins in Wiggins & Larson, 1989
- Eubasilissa Martynov, 1930
- Fabria Milne, 1934
- Hagenella Martynov, 1924
- Neurocyta Navas, 1916
- Oligostomis Kolenati, 1848
- Oligostomus Kolenati, 1848
- Oligotricha Rambur, 1842
- Phryganea Linnaeus, 1758
- Ptilostomis Kolenati, 1859
- Semblis Fabricius, 1775
- Trichostegia Kolenati, 1848

subfamily Yphriinae Wiggins 1962 (monogeneric)

- Yphria Milne, 1934 - monotypic Yphria californica (Banks, 1907)
