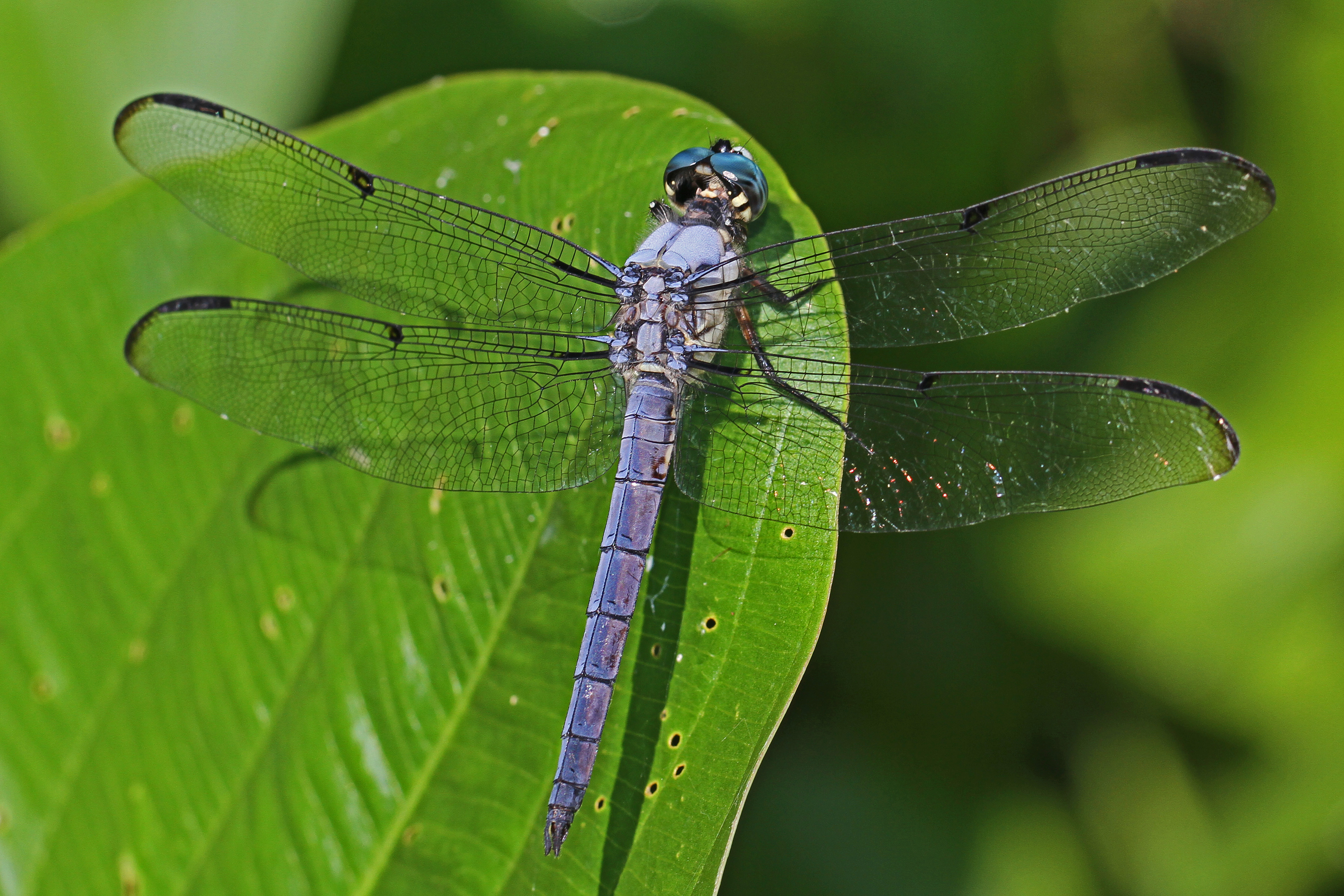
- Libellula vibrans

Scientific classification
- Kingdom: Animalia
- Phylum: Arthropoda
- Clade: Pancrustacea
- Class: Insecta
- Order: Odonata
- Suborder: Anisoptera
- Superfamily: Libelluloidea
- Family: Libellulidae
- Subfamily: Libellulinae; Leach, 1815

= Libellulinae =

Subfamily of dragonflies

Libellulinae is a subfamily of dragonflies in the family Libellulidae. This subfamily currently contains 29 genera. Genetic evidence suggests that this subfamily is monophyletic. The subfamily Libellulinae represents 70% of the species in the superfamily Libelluloidea.

== Description ==
The defining characteristics of Libellulinae are having: a smooth back edge to their eyes; a sulcus (a groove on the second thorax segment) that is S-shaped instead of straight; and second and third abdominal segments with many transverse carinae (raised ridges).

== Genera ==
- Aethiothemis Martin, 1908
- Agrionoptera Brauer, 1864
- Amphithemis Selys, 1891
- Boninthemis (Matsumura, 1913)
- Cannaphila Kirby, 1889
- Cratilla Kirby, 1900
- Dythemis Hagen, 1861
- Diplacina Brauer, 1868
- Epithemis Laidlaw, 1955
- Hadrothemis Karsch, 1891
- Ladona Needham, 1897
- Lathrecista Kirby, 1889
- Libellula Linnaeus, 1758
- Lokia Ris, 1919
- Lyriothemis Brauer, 1868
- Misagria Kirby, 1889
- Nesciothemis Longfield, 1955
- Nesoxenia Kirby, 1889
- Notolibellula Theischinger & Watson, 1977
- Orchithemis Brauer, 1878
- Orthemis Hagen, 1861
- Orthetrum Newman, 1833
- Oxythemis Ris, 1910
- Phyllothemis Fraser, 1935
- Plathemis Hagen, 1861
- Pornothemis Krüger, 1902
- Potamarcha Karsch, 1890
- Protorthemis Kirby, 1889
- Thermorthemis Kirby, 1889
