= Aethiothemis carpenteri =

Scientific classification
- Kingdom: Animalia
- Phylum: Arthropoda
- Class: Insecta
- Order: Odonata
- Infraorder: Anisoptera
- Family: Libellulidae
- Genus: Aethiothemis
- Species: A. carpenteri

Binomial name
- Aethiothemis carpenteri (Fraser, 1944)

Species of dragonfly

Aethiothemis carpenteri is a species of dragonfly in the family Libellulidae. It was originally described as Oxythemis carpenteri, named in honor of the collector of the type specimen, G. D. Hale Carpenter. The name is considered by some authorities to be a taxonomic synonym of Aethiothemis solitaria, though the taxonomy of the solitaria species complex is not clear.

== See also ==
- Aethiothemis
