= A. palustris =

A. palustris may refer to:

- Aethiothemis palustris, a species of dragonfly in family Libellulidae
- Anacamptis palustris, a species of orchid
