= Lokia =

Scientific classification
- Kingdom: Animalia
- Phylum: Arthropoda
- Class: Insecta
- Order: Odonata
- Infraorder: Anisoptera
- Family: Libellulidae
- Subfamily: Libellulinae
- Genus: Lokia; Ris, 1919

Genus of dragonflies

Lokia is a genus of dragonfly in the family Libellulidae. It contains the following species from Uganda and the Congo:

- Lokia circe (Ris, 1910)
- Lokia coryndoni Fraser, 1953
- Lokia ellioti Lieftinck, 1969
- Lokia erythromelas (Ris, 1910)
- Lokia gamblesi Lieftinck, 1969
- Lokia incongruens (Karsch, 1893)
- Lokia modesta (Ris, 1910)
