= Aethiothemis bella =

Conservation status
- Least Concern (IUCN 3.1)

Scientific classification
- Domain: Eukaryota
- Kingdom: Animalia
- Phylum: Arthropoda
- Class: Insecta
- Order: Odonata
- Infraorder: Anisoptera
- Family: Libellulidae
- Genus: Aethiothemis
- Species: A. bella

Binomial name
- Aethiothemis bella (Fisher, 1939)

Species of dragonfly

Aethiothemis bella is a species of dragonfly in the family Libellulidae.
