= Hadrothemis defecta =

Conservation status
- Least Concern (IUCN 3.1)

Scientific classification
- Kingdom: Animalia
- Phylum: Arthropoda
- Class: Insecta
- Order: Odonata
- Infraorder: Anisoptera
- Family: Libellulidae
- Genus: Hadrothemis
- Species: H. defecta

Binomial name
- Hadrothemis defecta (Karsch, 1891)

Species of dragonfly

Hadrothemis defecta is a species of dragonfly in the family Libellulidae. It is found in Angola, Cameroon, Central African Republic, the Republic of the Congo, the Democratic Republic of the Congo, Ivory Coast, Equatorial Guinea, Ghana, Guinea, Guinea-Bissau, Liberia, Nigeria, Sierra Leone, Uganda, and Zambia. Its natural habitats are subtropical or tropical moist lowland forests, shrub-dominated wetlands, and intermittent freshwater marshes.
