= Hadrothemis infesta =

Conservation status
- Least Concern (IUCN 3.1)

Scientific classification
- Kingdom: Animalia
- Phylum: Arthropoda
- Class: Insecta
- Order: Odonata
- Infraorder: Anisoptera
- Family: Libellulidae
- Genus: Hadrothemis
- Species: H. infesta

Binomial name
- Hadrothemis infesta (Karsch, 1891)

Species of dragonfly

Hadrothemis infesta is a species of dragonfly in the family Libellulidae. It is found in Cameroon, the Republic of the Congo, the Democratic Republic of the Congo, Ivory Coast, Equatorial Guinea, Gabon, Ghana, Guinea, Liberia, Nigeria, Sierra Leone, and Uganda. Its natural habitats are subtropical or tropical moist lowland forests, shrub-dominated wetlands, and intermittent freshwater marshes.
