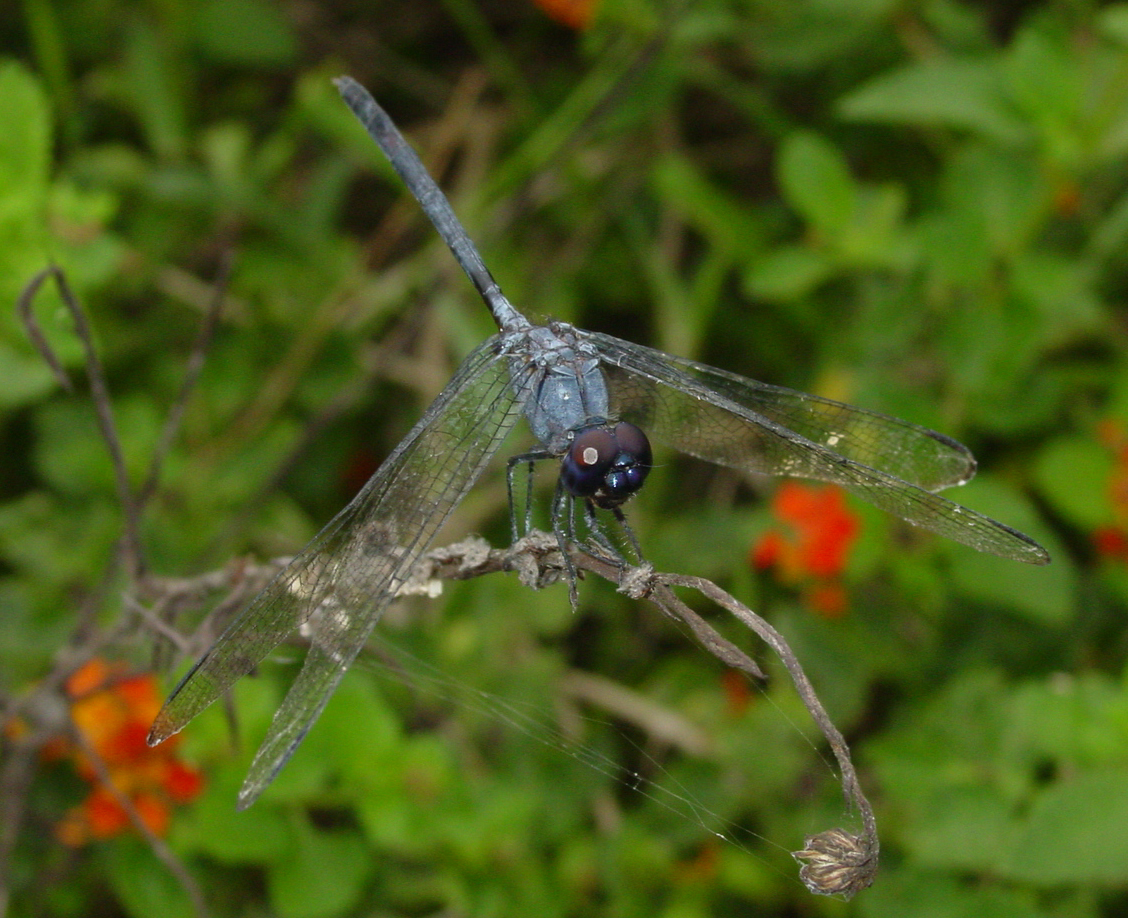

Conservation status
- Least Concern (IUCN 3.1)

Scientific classification
- Kingdom: Animalia
- Phylum: Arthropoda
- Class: Insecta
- Order: Odonata
- Infraorder: Anisoptera
- Family: Libellulidae
- Genus: Dythemis
- Species: D. nigrescens

Binomial name
- Dythemis nigrescens Calvert, 1899

= Dythemis nigrescens =

Species of dragonfly

Dythemis nigrescens, the black setwing, is a species of skimmer in the dragonfly family Libellulidae. It is found in Central America and North America.

The IUCN conservation status of Dythemis nigrescens is "LC", least concern, with no immediate threat to the species' survival. The population is stable. The IUCN status was reviewed in 2017.

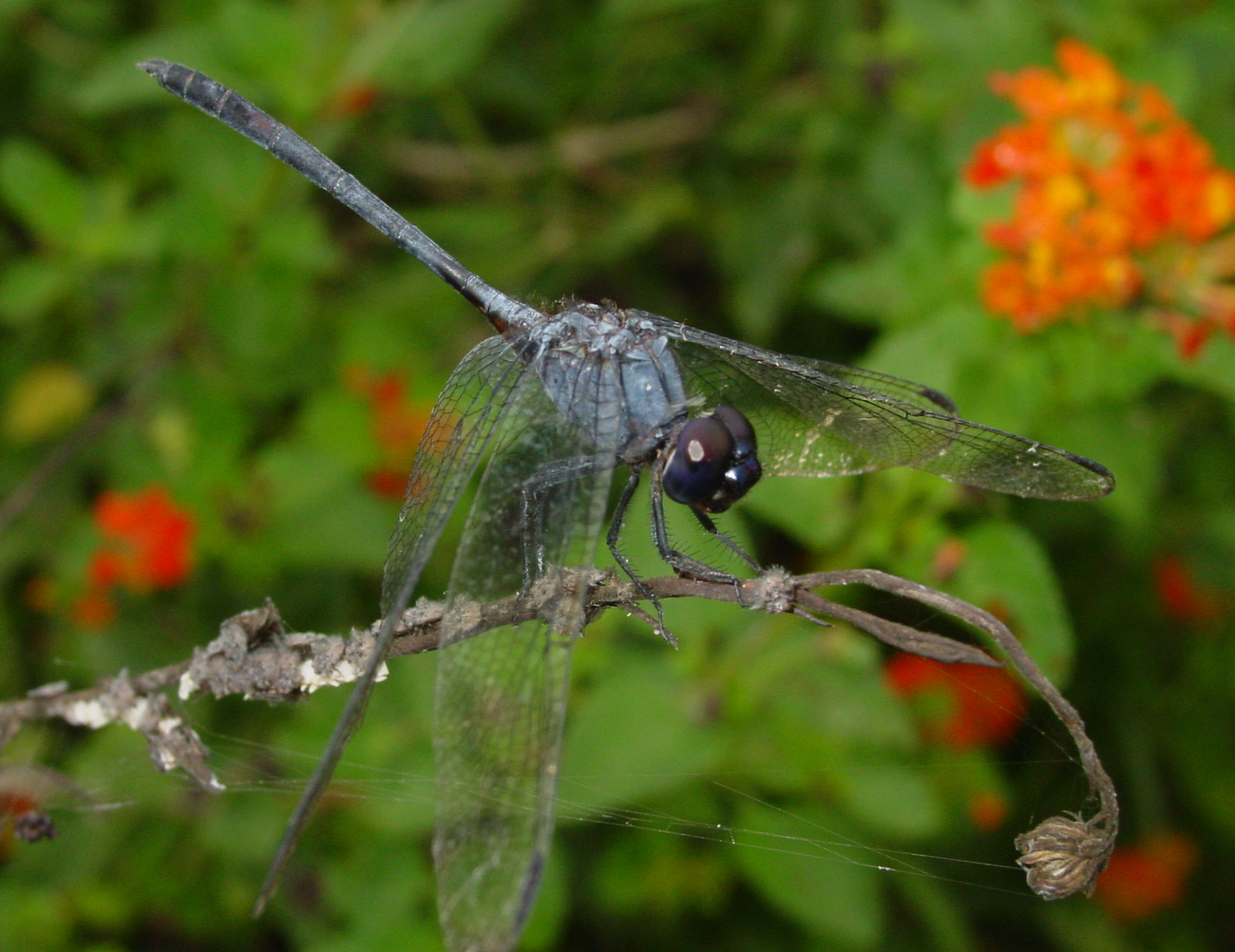
Black setwing, Dythemis nigrescens
