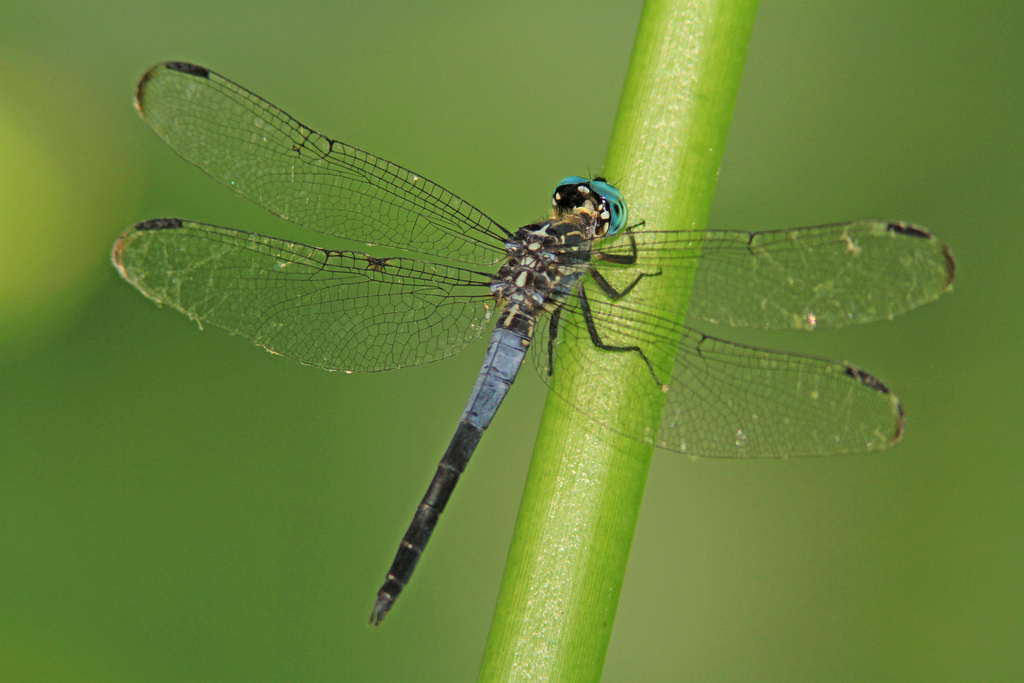

Conservation status
- Least Concern (IUCN 3.1)

Scientific classification
- Kingdom: Animalia
- Phylum: Arthropoda
- Class: Insecta
- Order: Odonata
- Infraorder: Anisoptera
- Family: Libellulidae
- Genus: Cannaphila
- Species: C. insularis

Binomial name
- Cannaphila insularis Kirby, 1889

= Cannaphila insularis =

Species of dragonfly

Cannaphila insularis, the gray-waisted skimmer, is a species of skimmer in the family Libellulidae. It is found in the Caribbean, Central America, and North America.

The IUCN conservation status of Cannaphila insularis is "LC", least concern, with no immediate threat to the species' survival. The population is stable.

== Subspecies ==
These two subspecies belong to the species Cannaphila insularis.

- Cannaphila insularis funerea (Carpenter, 1897)
- Cannaphila insularis insularis Kirby, 1889
