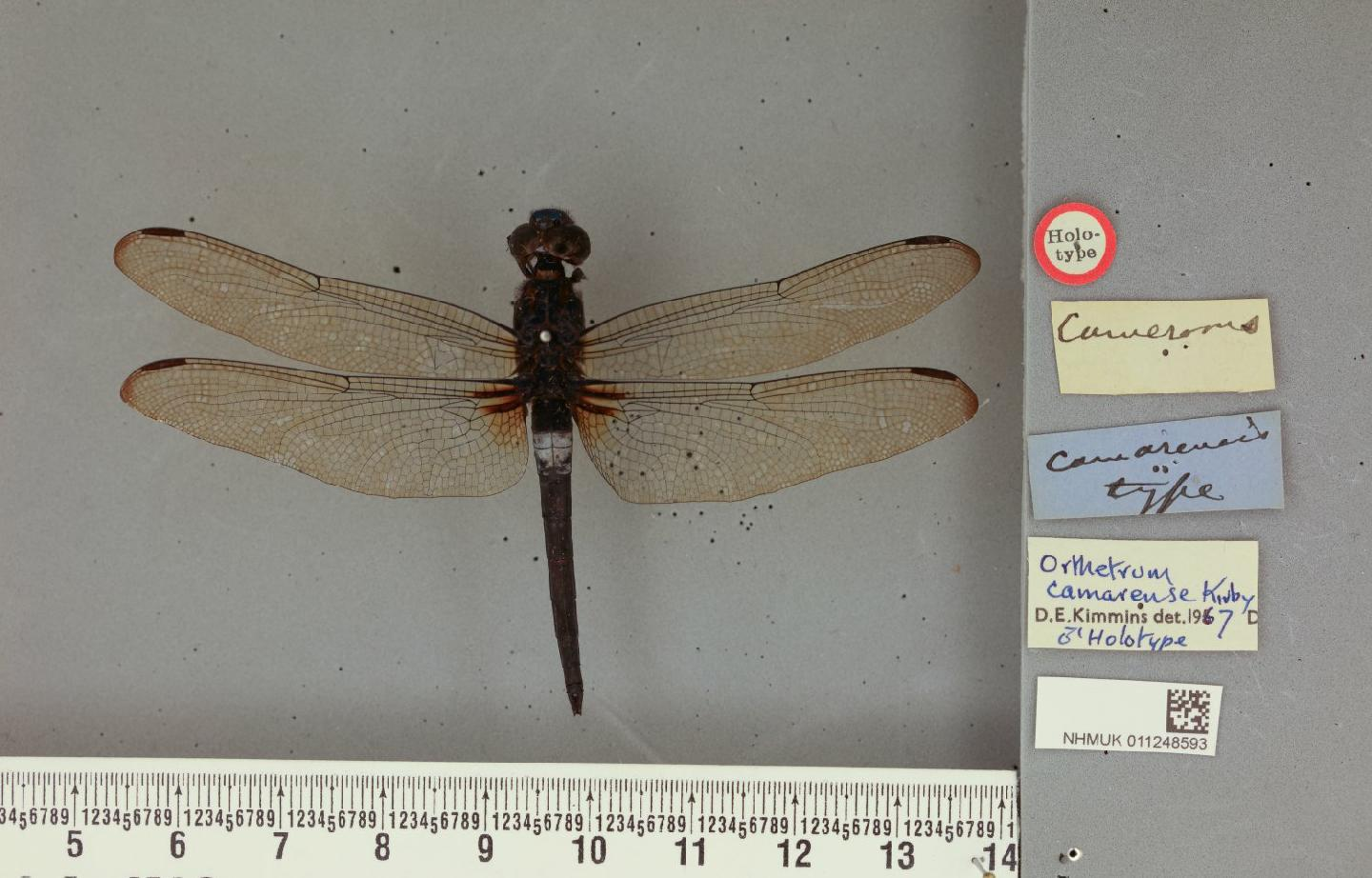

Conservation status
- Least Concern (IUCN 3.1)

Scientific classification
- Kingdom: Animalia
- Phylum: Arthropoda
- Class: Insecta
- Order: Odonata
- Infraorder: Anisoptera
- Family: Libellulidae
- Genus: Hadrothemis
- Species: H. camarensis

Binomial name
- Hadrothemis camarensis (Kirby, 1889)

= Hadrothemis camarensis =

Species of dragonfly

Hadrothemis camarensis is a species of dragonfly in the family Libellulidae. It is found in Angola, Cameroon, the Democratic Republic of the Congo, Ivory Coast, Equatorial Guinea, Gabon, Ghana, Guinea, Kenya, Liberia, Nigeria, Sierra Leone, Uganda, and Zambia. Its natural habitat is subtropical or tropical moist lowland forests.
