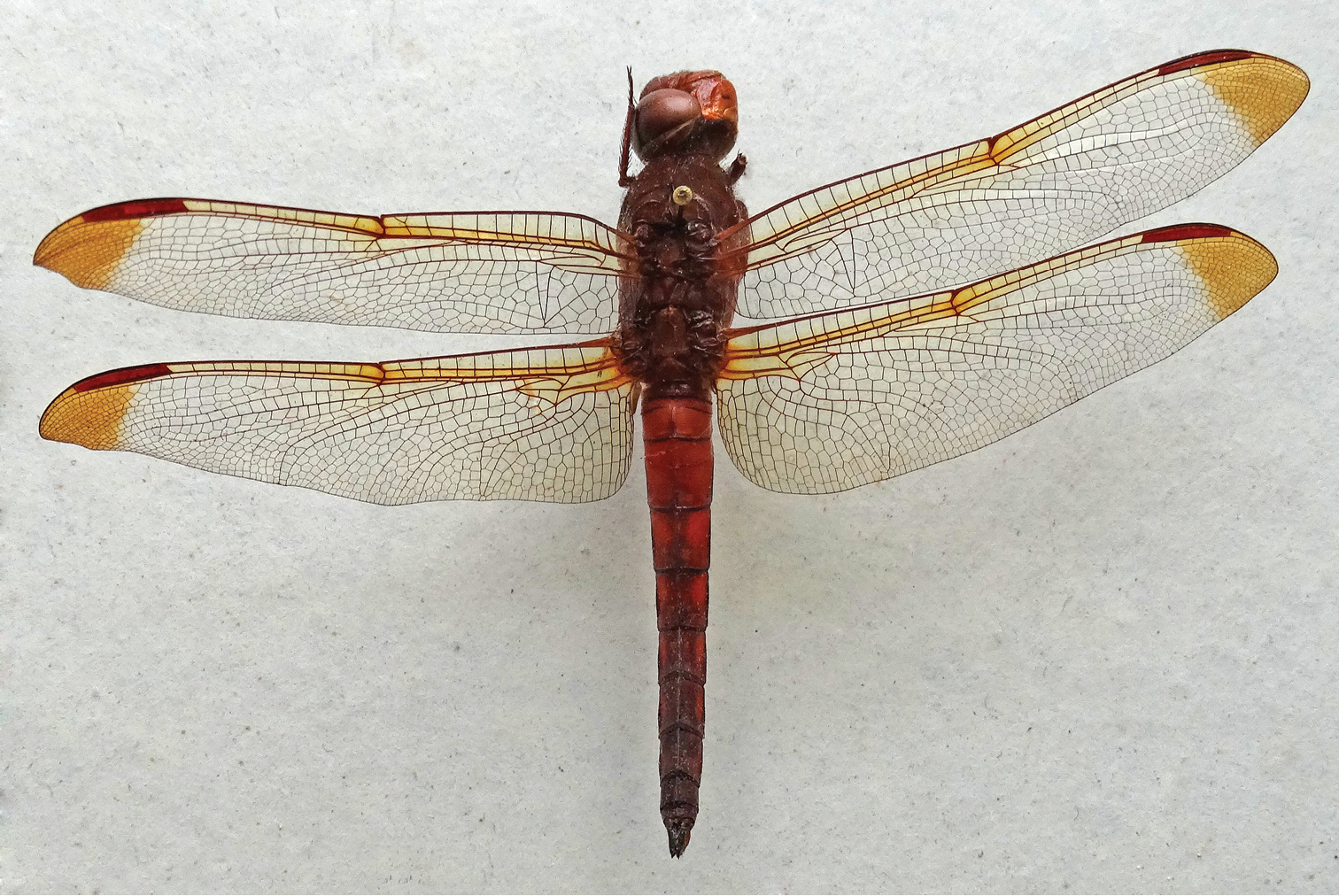
- Hadrothemis scabrifrons

Scientific classification
- Kingdom: Animalia
- Phylum: Arthropoda
- Class: Insecta
- Order: Odonata
- Infraorder: Anisoptera
- Family: Libellulidae
- Subfamily: Libellulinae
- Genus: Hadrothemis; Karsch, 1891

= Hadrothemis =

Jungle-skimmers

Genus of dragonflies

Hadrothemis is a genus of dragonfly in the family Libellulidae. They are commonly known as jungle-skimmers.

== Species ==
The genus contains the following species:

Male	Female	Scientific name	Common name	Distribution
		Hadrothemis camarensis (Kirby, 1889)	tree-hole jungle-skimmer	Angola, Cameroon, the Democratic Republic of the Congo, Ivory Coast, Equatorial Guinea, Gabon, Ghana, Guinea, Kenya, Liberia, Nigeria, Sierra Leone, Uganda, and Zambia.
		Hadrothemis coacta (Karsch, 1891)	robust jungle-skimmer	Angola, Cameroon, the Republic of the Congo, the Democratic Republic of the Congo, Ivory Coast, Equatorial Guinea, Gabon, Ghana, Liberia, Nigeria, and Uganda.
		Hadrothemis defecta (Karsch, 1891)	red jungle-skimmer	Angola, Cameroon, Central African Republic, the Republic of the Congo, the Democratic Republic of the Congo, Ivory Coast, Equatorial Guinea, Ghana, Guinea, Guinea-Bissau, Liberia, Nigeria, Sierra Leone, Uganda, and Zambia.
		Hadrothemis infesta (Karsch, 1891)	slender jungle-skimmer	Cameroon, the Republic of the Congo, the Democratic Republic of the Congo, Ivory Coast, Equatorial Guinea, Gabon, Ghana, Guinea, Liberia, Nigeria, Sierra Leone, and Uganda.
		Hadrothemis scabrifrons Ris, 1909	red jungle-skimmer	Kenya, Malawi, Mozambique, Tanzania, Zambia, and Zimbabwe.
		Hadrothemis versuta (Karsch, 1891)	changeable jungle-skimmer	Cameroon, Central African Republic, the Republic of the Congo, the Democratic Republic of the Congo, Ivory Coast, Equatorial Guinea, Gabon, Guinea, Liberia, Nigeria, Uganda, and Zambia.
		Hadrothemis vrijdaghi Schouteden, 1934	Golden-winged Jungleskimmer	Democratic Republic of the Congo
