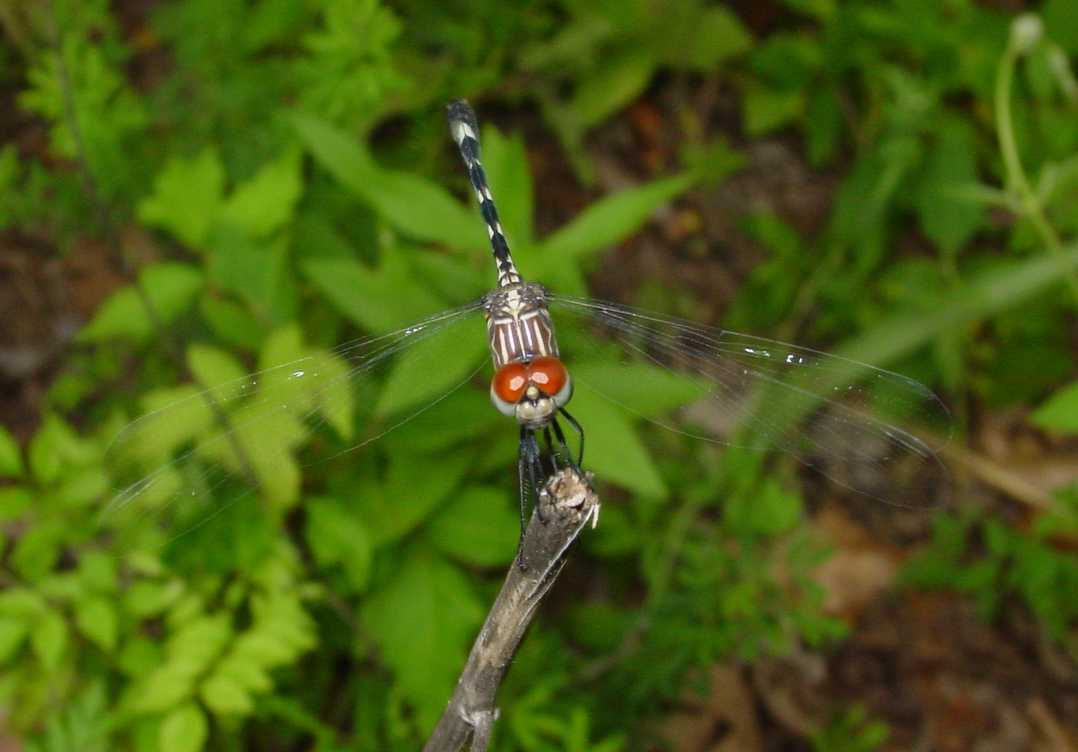

Conservation status
- Least Concern (IUCN 3.1)

Scientific classification
- Kingdom: Animalia
- Phylum: Arthropoda
- Class: Insecta
- Order: Odonata
- Infraorder: Anisoptera
- Family: Libellulidae
- Genus: Dythemis
- Species: D. velox

Binomial name
- Dythemis velox Hagen, 1861

= Dythemis velox =

Species of dragonfly

Dythemis velox, the swift setwing, is a species of skimmer in the dragonfly family Libellulidae. It is found in Central America and North America.

The IUCN conservation status of Dythemis velox is "LC", least concern, with no immediate threat to the species' survival. The population is increasing. The IUCN status was reviewed in 2017.

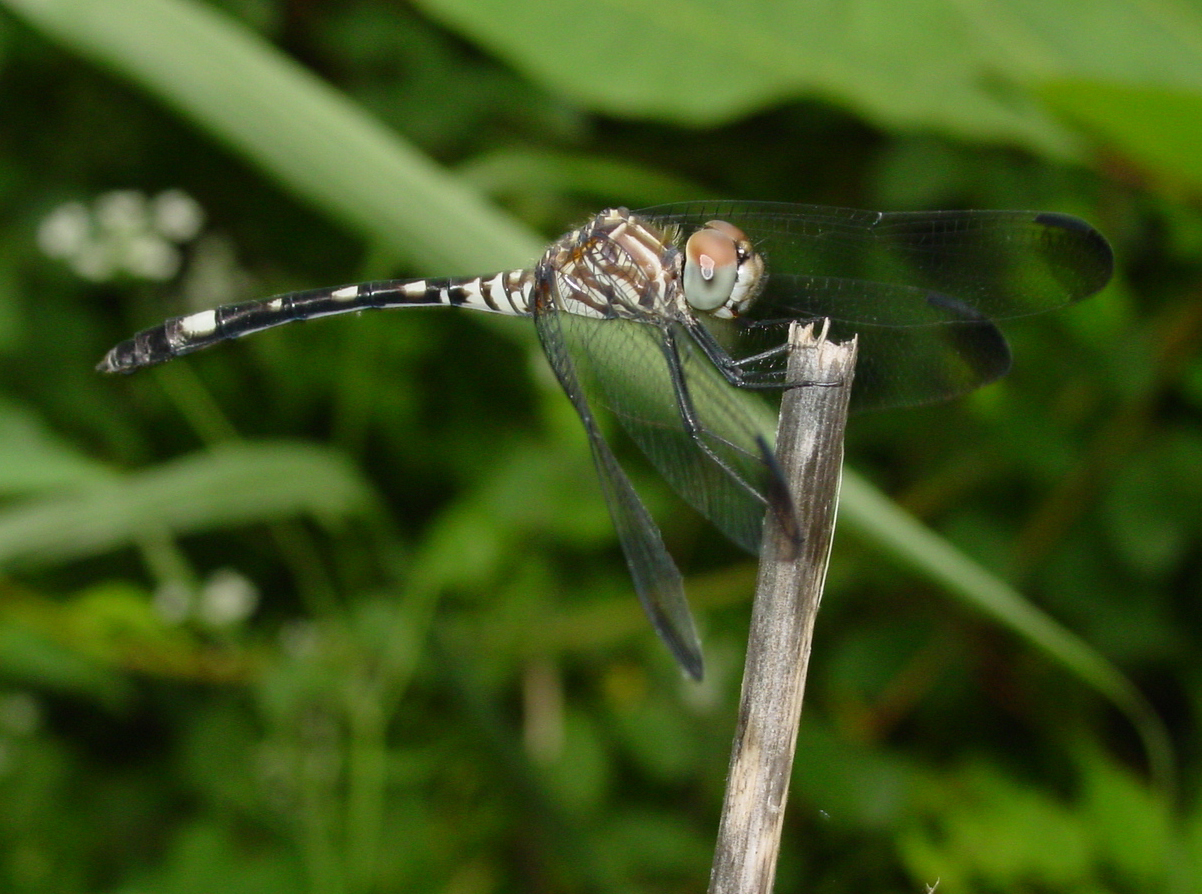
Swift setwing, Dythemis velox

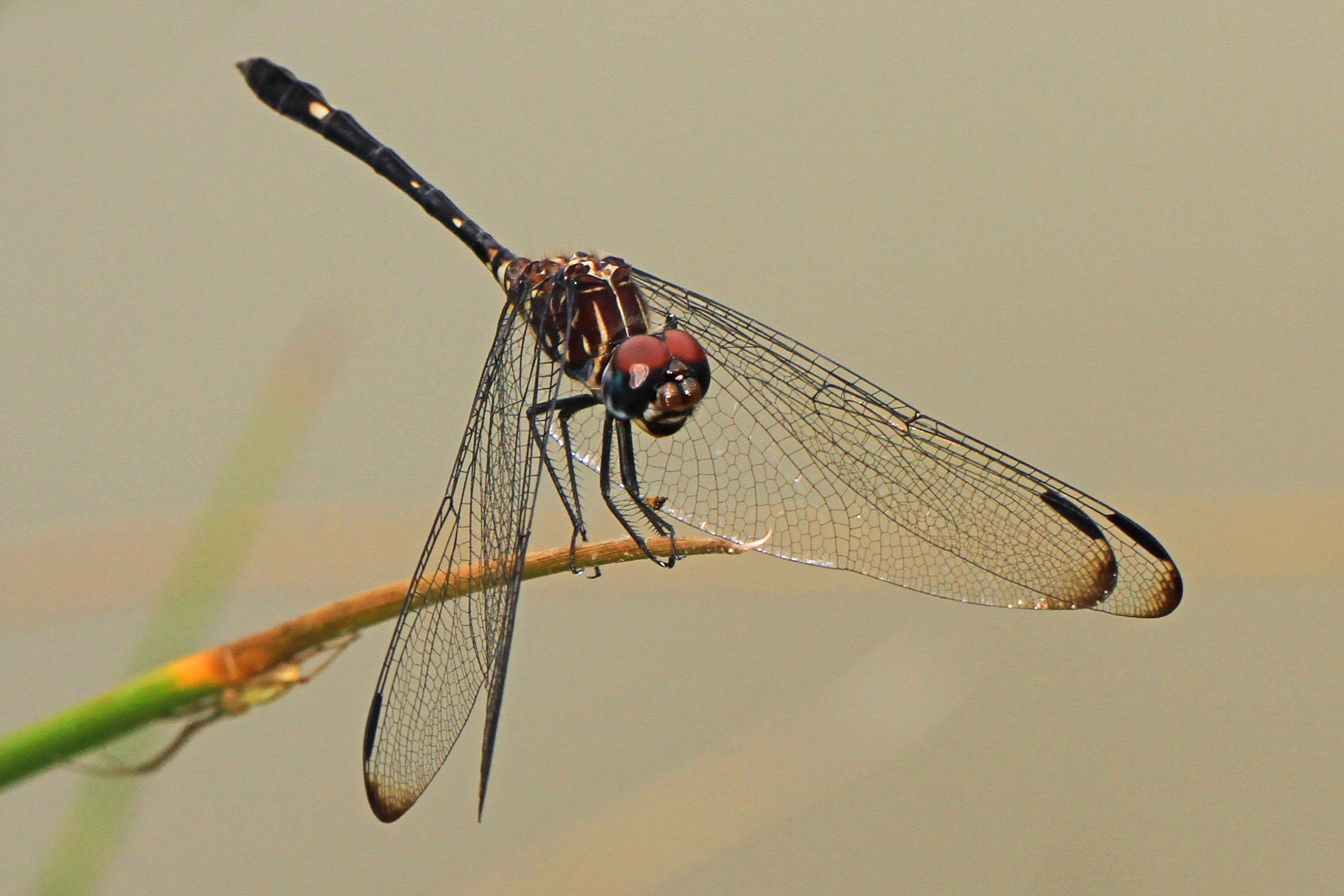
Swift setwing, Dythemis velox
