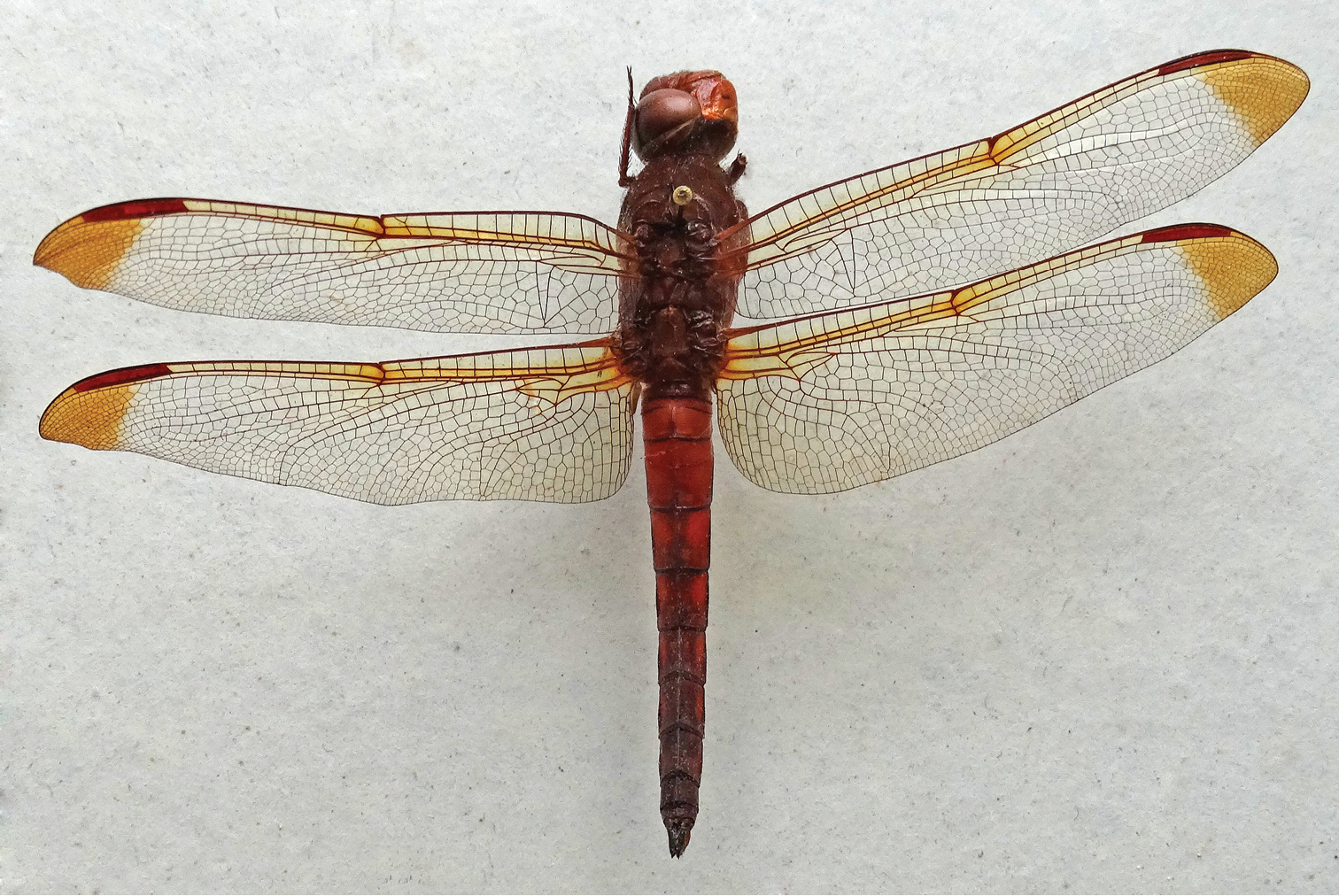

Conservation status
- Least Concern (IUCN 3.1)

Scientific classification
- Kingdom: Animalia
- Phylum: Arthropoda
- Class: Insecta
- Order: Odonata
- Infraorder: Anisoptera
- Family: Libellulidae
- Genus: Hadrothemis
- Species: H. scabrifrons

Binomial name
- Hadrothemis scabrifrons Ris, 1910

= Hadrothemis scabrifrons =

Species of dragonfly

Hadrothemis scabrifrons, commonly known as the red jungle-skimmer, is a species of dragonfly in the family Libellulidae. It is found in Kenya, Malawi, Mozambique, Tanzania, Zambia, and Zimbabwe. Its natural habitat is subtropical or tropical moist lowland forests. It is threatened by habitat loss due to rapid deforestation in the area due to agriculture and logging.
