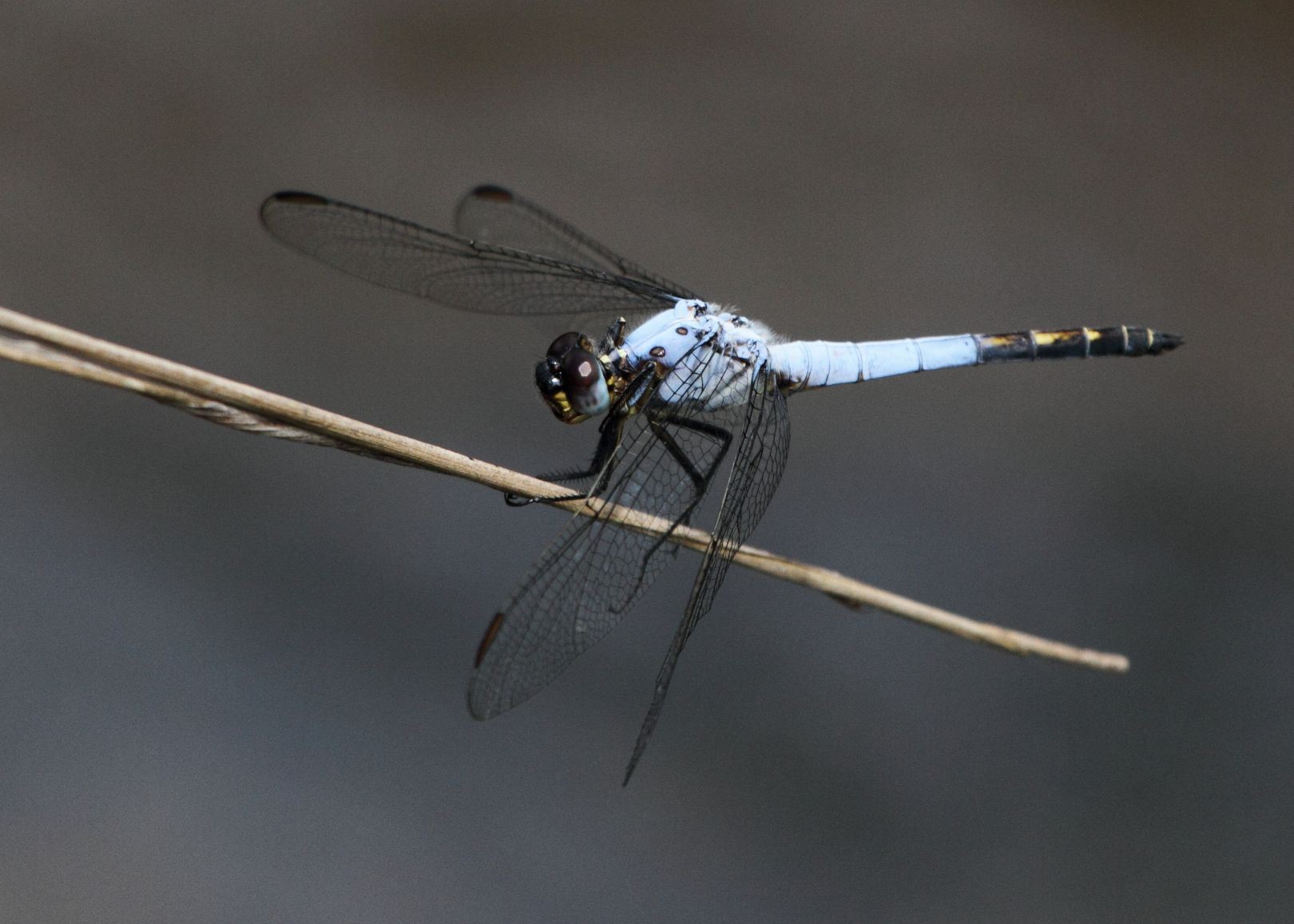
- Nesciothemis farinosa

Scientific classification
- Kingdom: Animalia
- Phylum: Arthropoda
- Class: Insecta
- Order: Odonata
- Infraorder: Anisoptera
- Family: Libellulidae
- Subfamily: Libellulinae
- Genus: Nesciothemis; Longfield, 1955

= Nesciothemis =

Genus of dragonflies

Nesciothemis is a genus of dragonflies in the family Libellulidae. It contains the following species:

- Nesciothemis farinosa (Förster, 1898) - Black-tailed Dancer, Black-tailed False-skimmer, Black-tailed Skimmer, Common Blacktail (not to be confused with the Eurasian species Orthetrum cancellatum which shares some of these common names).
- Nesciothemis fitzgeraldi Pinhey, 1956
- Nesciothemis minor Gambles, 1966 - Small Blacktail
- Nesciothemis nigeriensis Gambles, 1966 - Northern Redtail
- Nesciothemis pujoli Pinhey, 1971 - Western Blacktail
