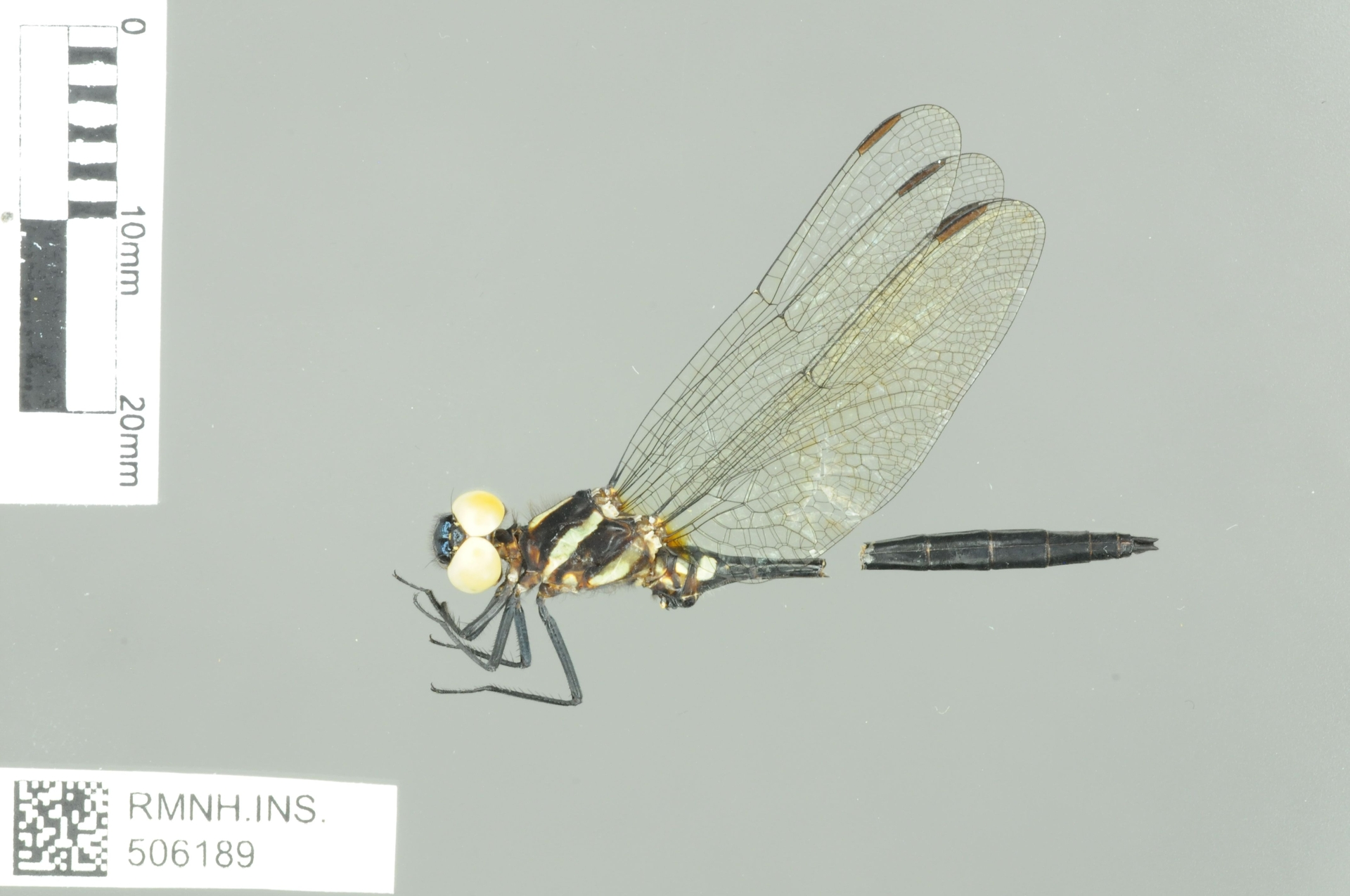

Conservation status
- Least Concern (IUCN 3.1)

Scientific classification
- Kingdom: Animalia
- Phylum: Arthropoda
- Class: Insecta
- Order: Odonata
- Infraorder: Anisoptera
- Family: Libellulidae
- Genus: Aethiothemis
- Species: A. basilewskyi

Binomial name
- Aethiothemis basilewskyi Fraser, 1954

Synonyms
- Aethiothemis watuliki Pinhey, 1962 [orth. error]; Aethiothemis watulikii Pinhey, 1962

= Aethiothemis basilewskyi =

Species of dragonfly

Aethiothemis basilewskyi is a species of dragonfly in the family Libellulidae. It is native to Africa, where it occurs in the Democratic Republic of the Congo and Zambia.
