= Lokia coryndoni =

Conservation status
- Least Concern (IUCN 3.1)

Scientific classification
- Kingdom: Animalia
- Phylum: Arthropoda
- Class: Insecta
- Order: Odonata
- Infraorder: Anisoptera
- Family: Libellulidae
- Genus: Lokia
- Species: L. coryndoni

Binomial name
- Lokia coryndoni Fraser, 1953

Species of dragonfly

Lokia coryndoni is a species of dragonfly in the family Libellulidae. It is endemic to Uganda. Its natural habitat is subtropical or tropical moist lowland forests. It is threatened by habitat loss.
