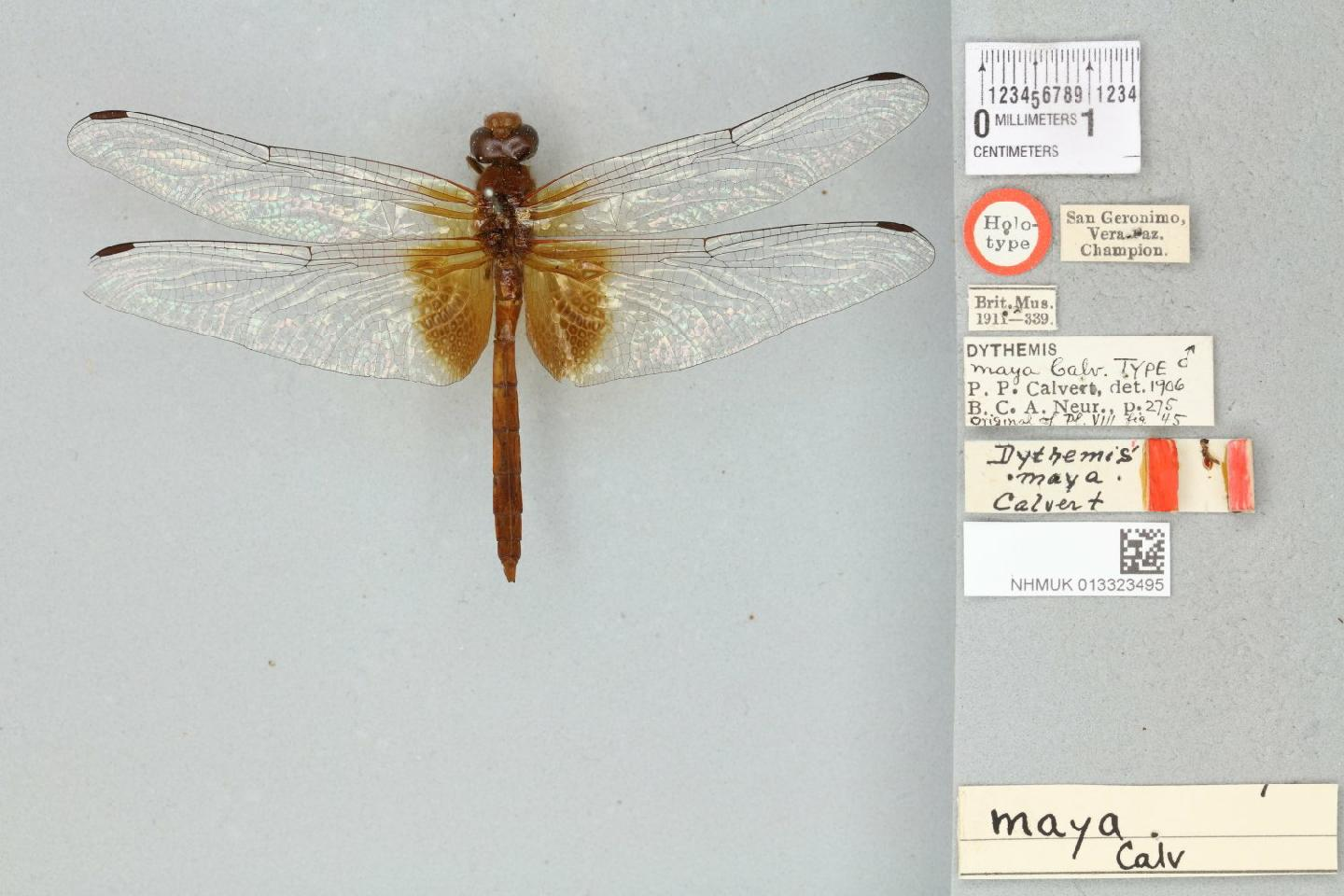

Conservation status
- Least Concern (IUCN 3.1)

Scientific classification
- Kingdom: Animalia
- Phylum: Arthropoda
- Class: Insecta
- Order: Odonata
- Infraorder: Anisoptera
- Family: Libellulidae
- Genus: Dythemis
- Species: D. maya

Binomial name
- Dythemis maya Calvert, 1906

= Dythemis maya =

Species of dragonfly

Dythemis maya, the mayan setwing, is a species of skimmer in the dragonfly family Libellulidae. It is found in Central America and North America.

The IUCN conservation status of Dythemis maya is "LC", least concern, with no immediate threat to the species' survival. The population is stable. The IUCN status was reviewed in 2017.
