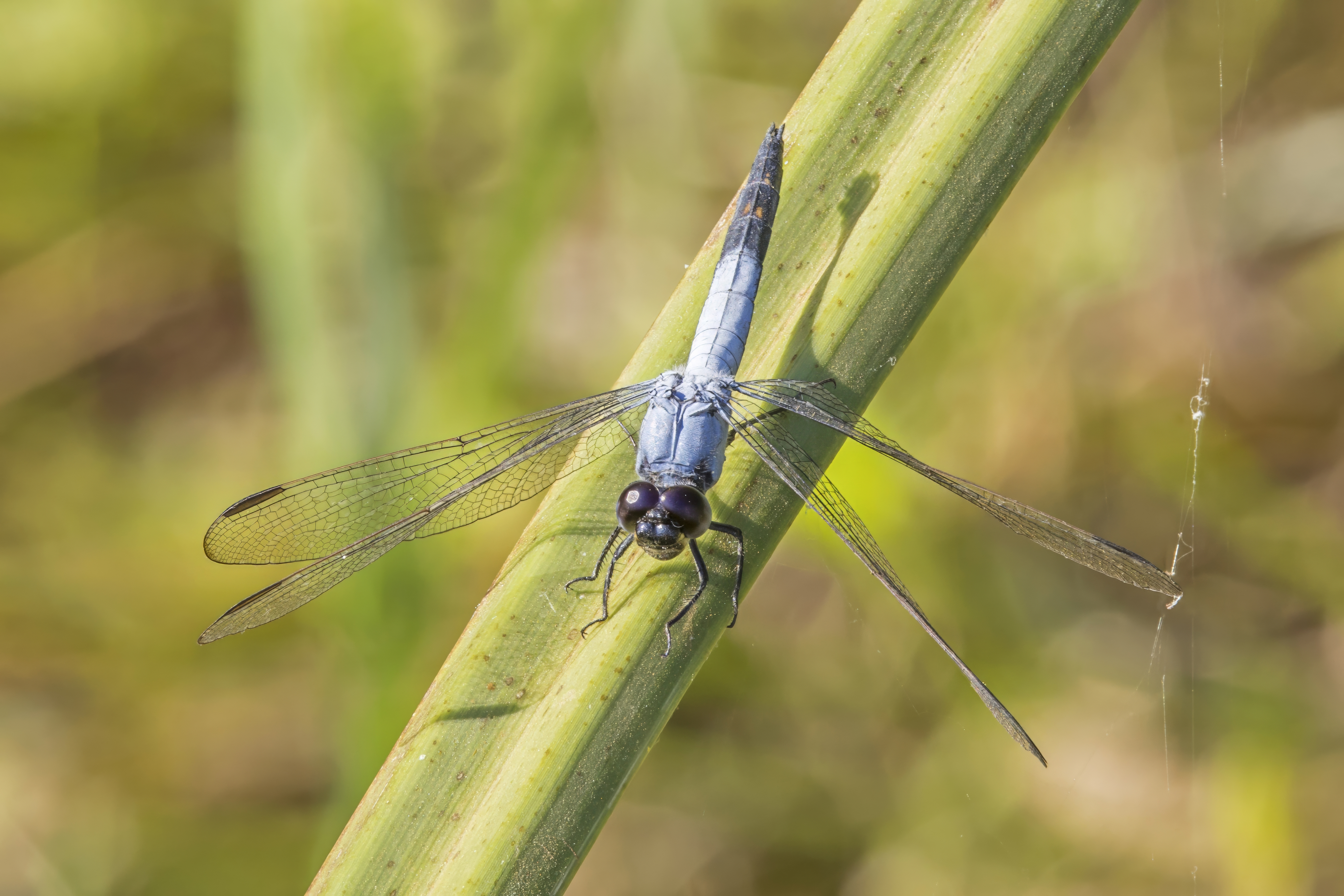
- Male in Eswatini

Conservation status
- Least Concern (IUCN 3.1)

Scientific classification
- Kingdom: Animalia
- Phylum: Arthropoda
- Class: Insecta
- Order: Odonata
- Infraorder: Anisoptera
- Family: Libellulidae
- Genus: Nesciothemis
- Species: N. farinosa

Binomial name
- Nesciothemis farinosa (Förster, 1898)

= Nesciothemis farinosa =

Species of dragonfly

Nesciothemis farinosa, the eastern blacktail, is a species of dragonfly in the family Libellulidae.

== Common names ==
Common names for this species include eastern blacktail, black-tailed skimmer (not to be confused with the European and Asian species of the same name, Orthetrum cancellatum), black-tailed dancer, black-tailed false-skimmer and common blacktail.

== Distribution and status ==
It is found in Angola, Botswana, the Democratic Republic of the Congo, Ivory Coast, Egypt, Ethiopia, Guinea, Kenya, Liberia, Malawi, Mali, Mozambique, Namibia, Nigeria, Sierra Leone, Somalia, South Africa, Sudan, Tanzania, Uganda, Zambia, Zimbabwe, and possibly Burundi.

== Habitat ==
Its natural habitats are subtropical or tropical moist lowland forests, dry savanna, moist savanna, subtropical or tropical dry shrubland, subtropical or tropical moist shrubland, rivers, intermittent rivers, swamps, freshwater lakes, intermittent freshwater lakes, freshwater marshes, and intermittent freshwater marshes.

== Gallery ==
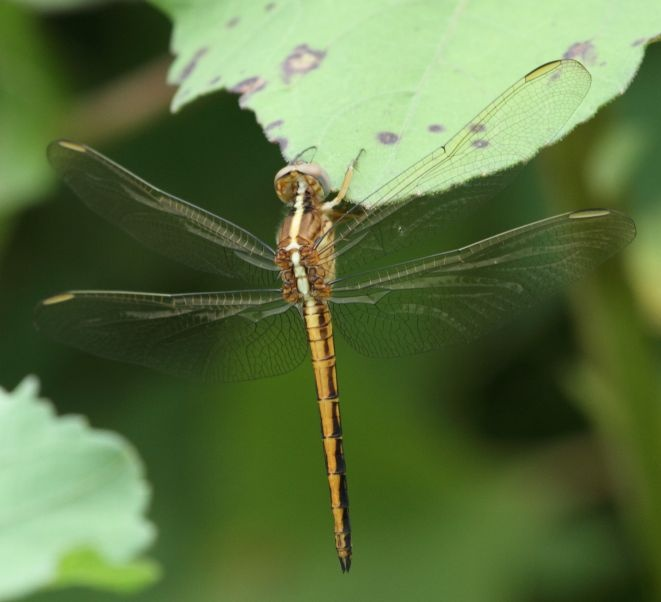
Teneral male

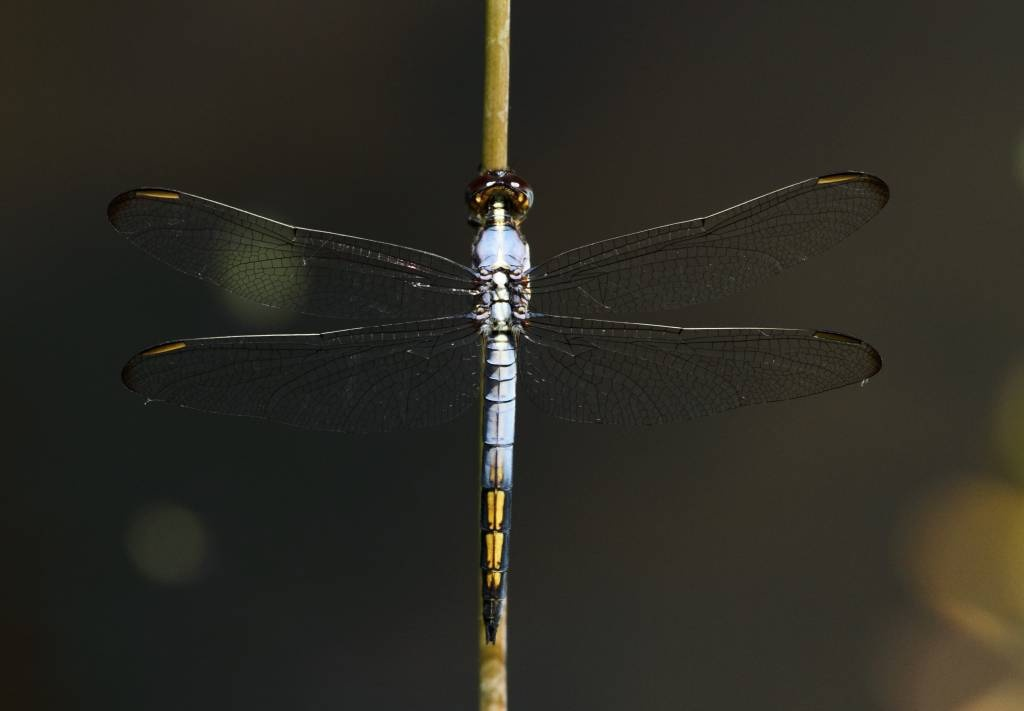
Immature male

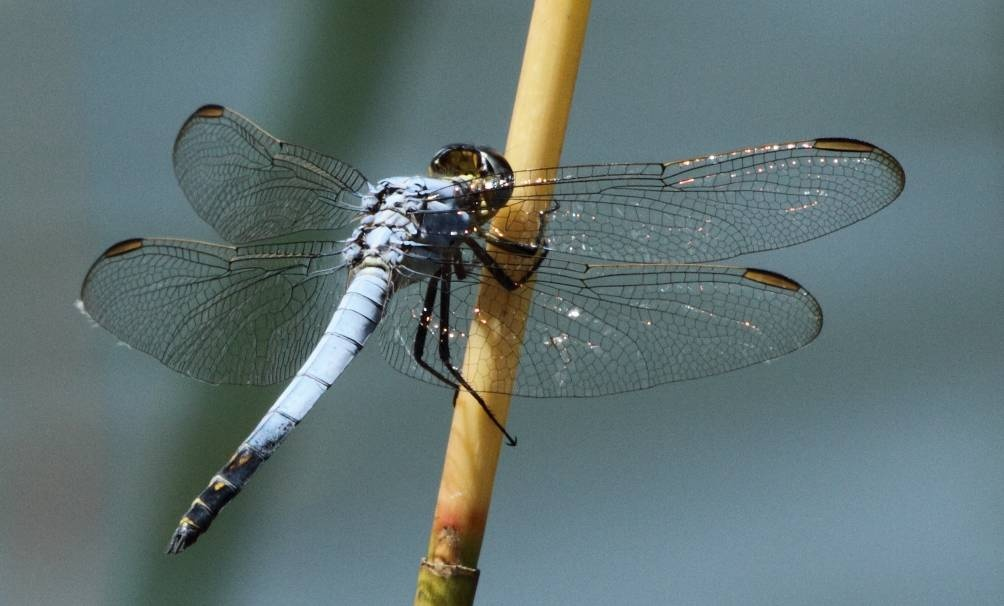
Male

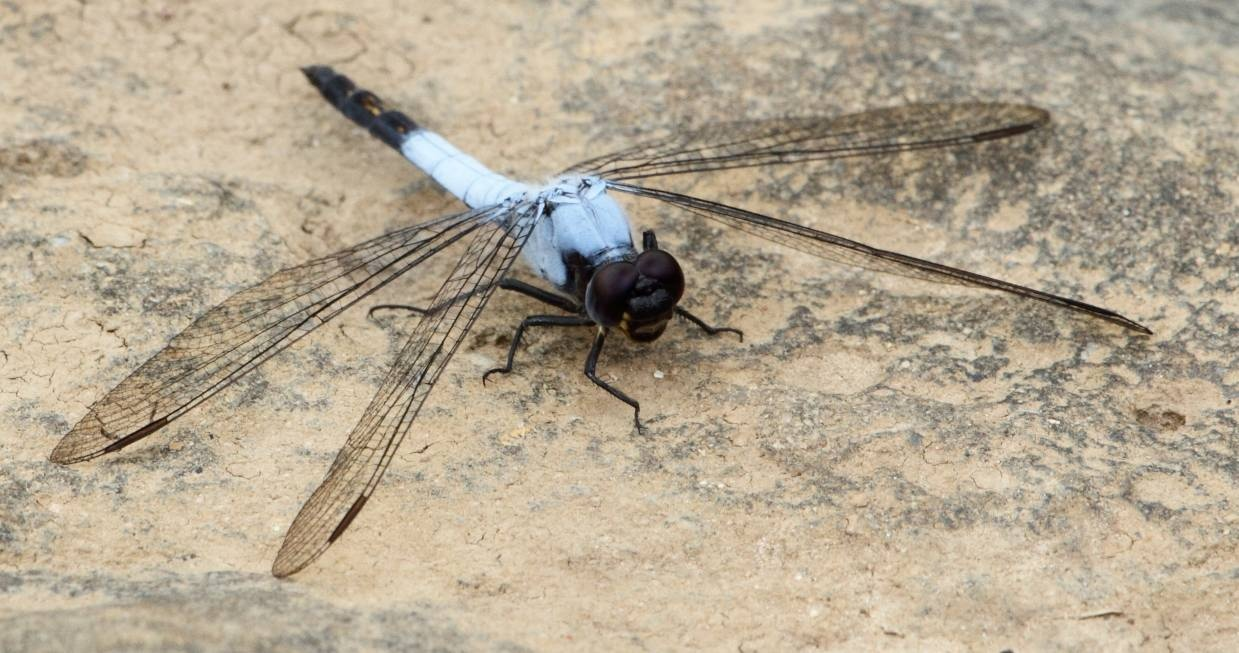
Mature male

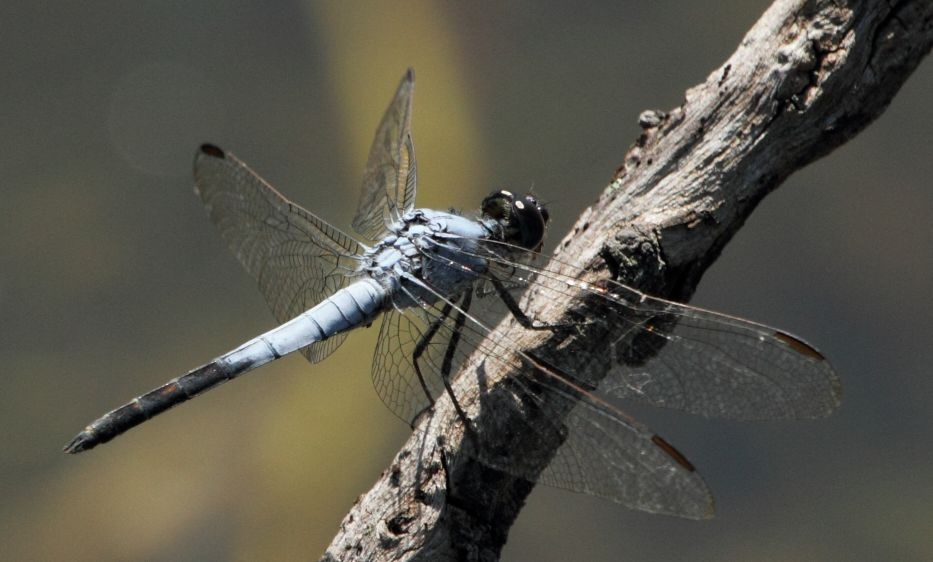
Old male

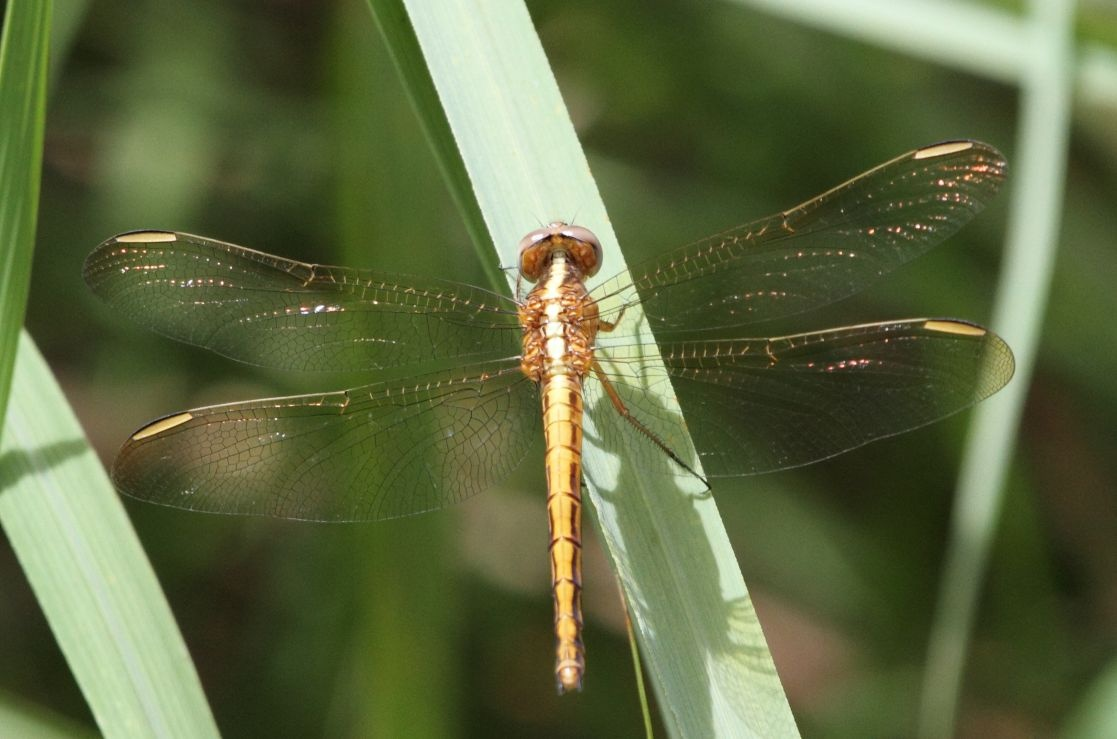
Teneral female

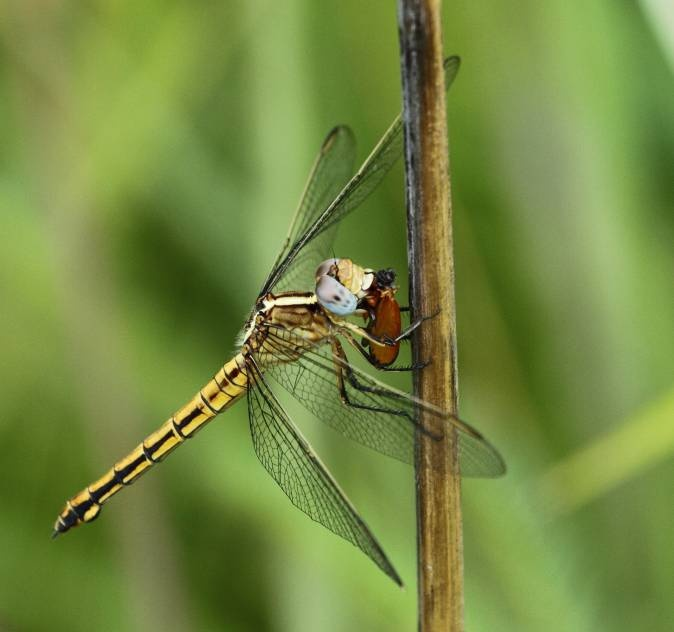
Female

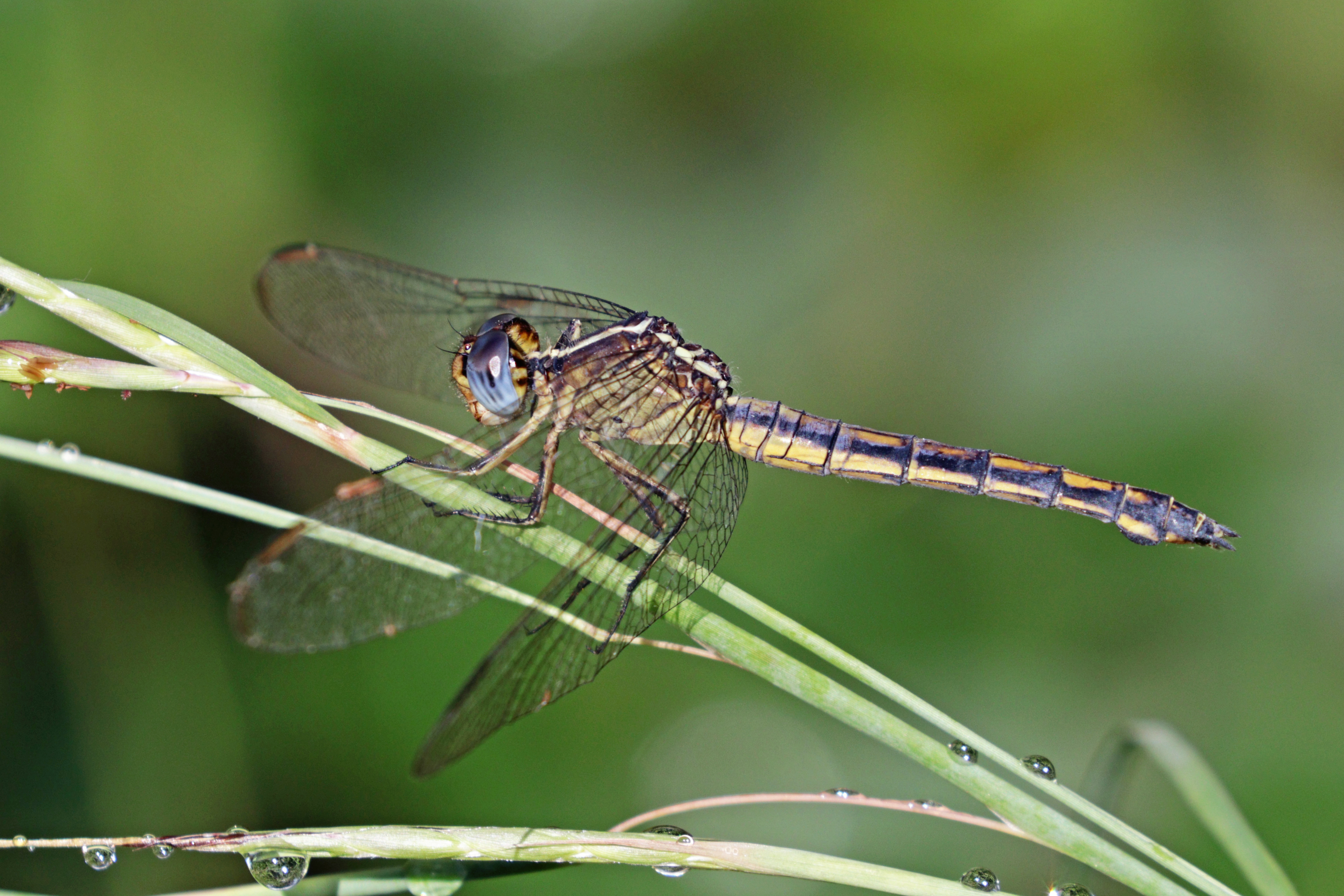
mature female

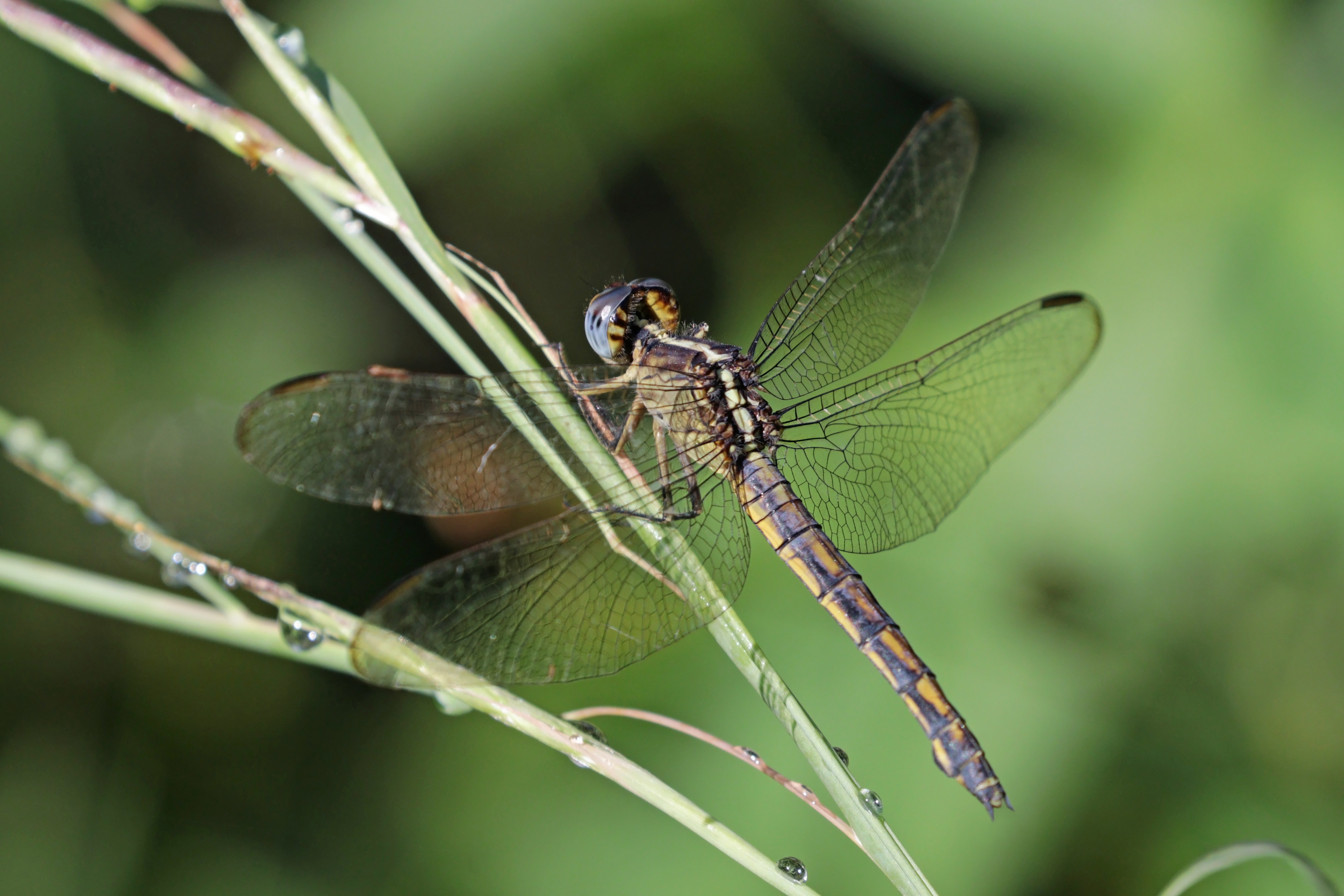
mature female

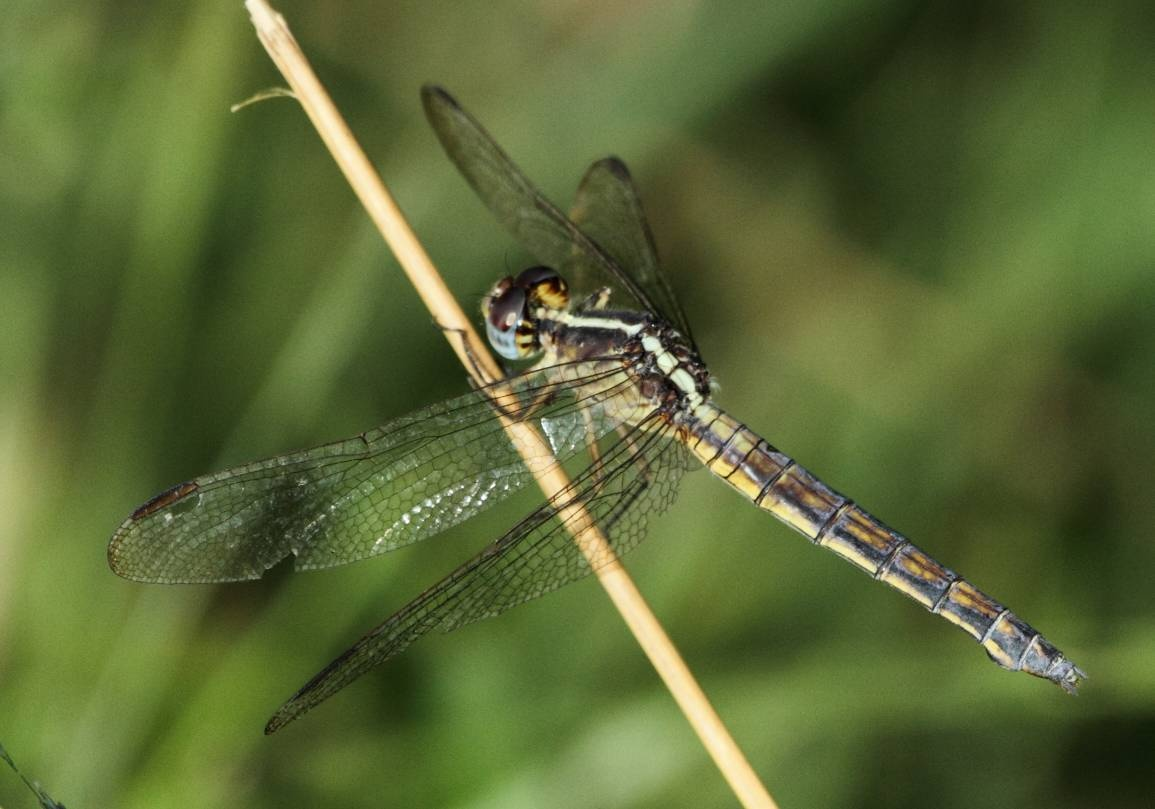
Old female 3

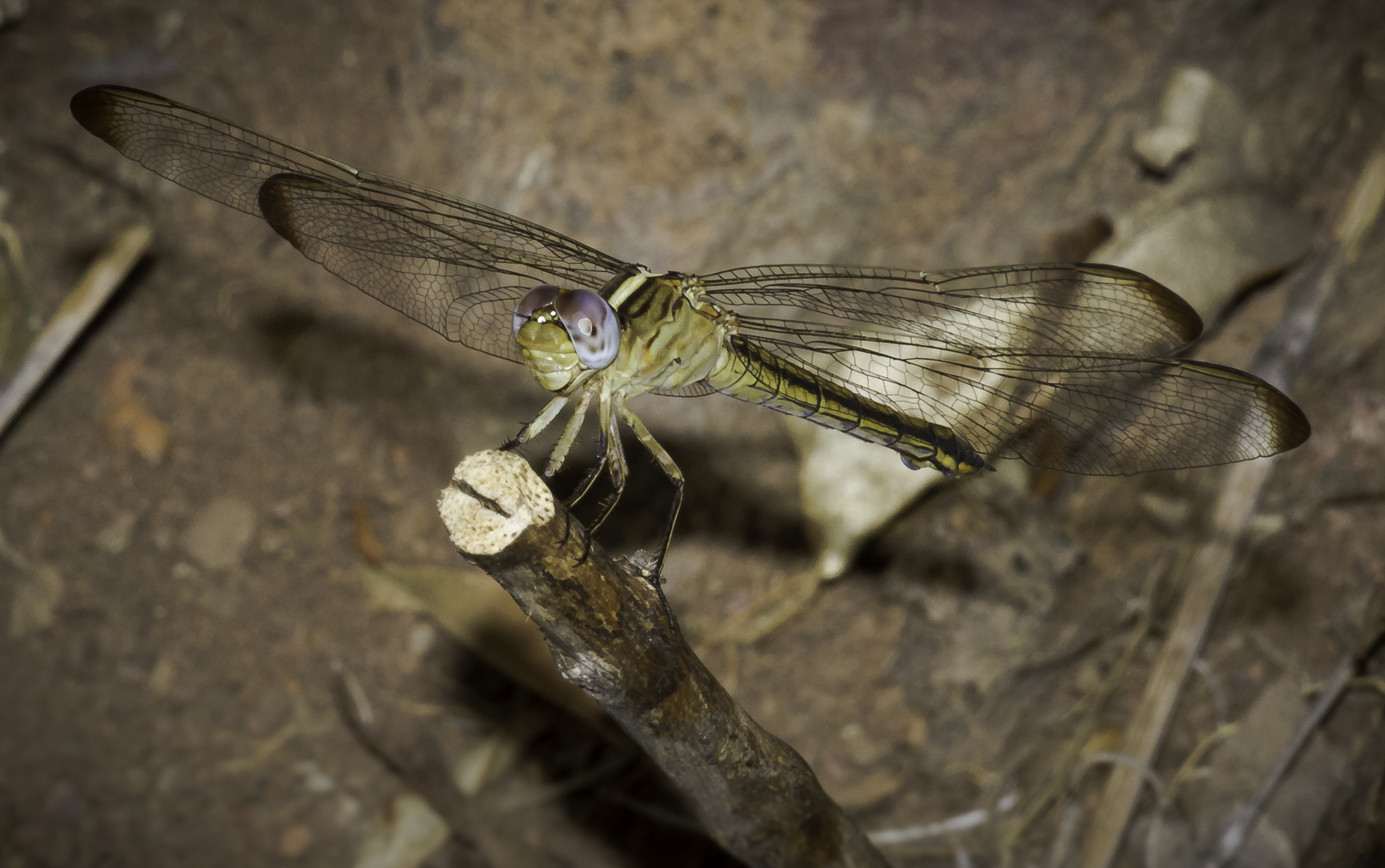
Female side showing face and darkened wing-tips

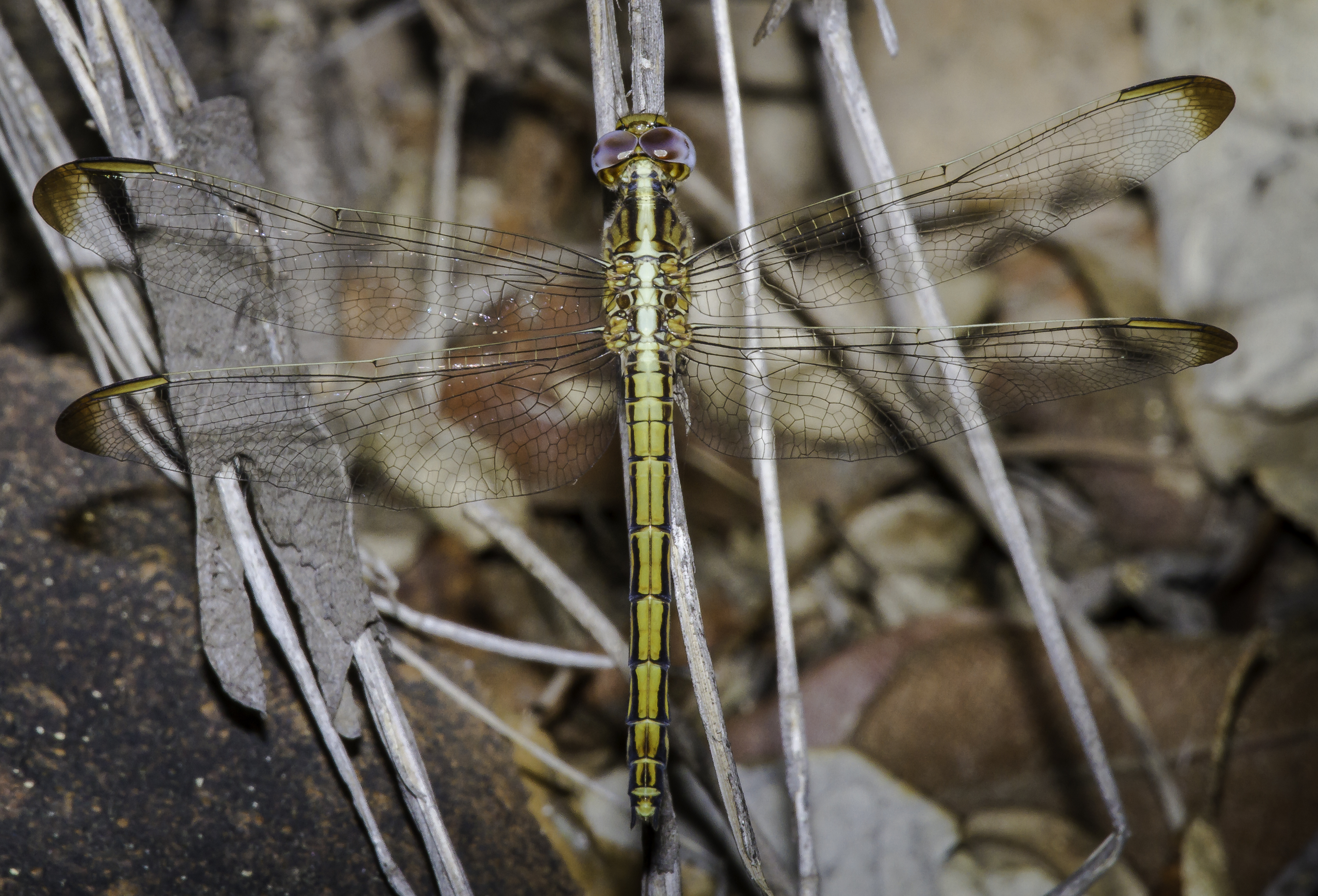
Eastern Female view from the top showing darkened wing-tips
