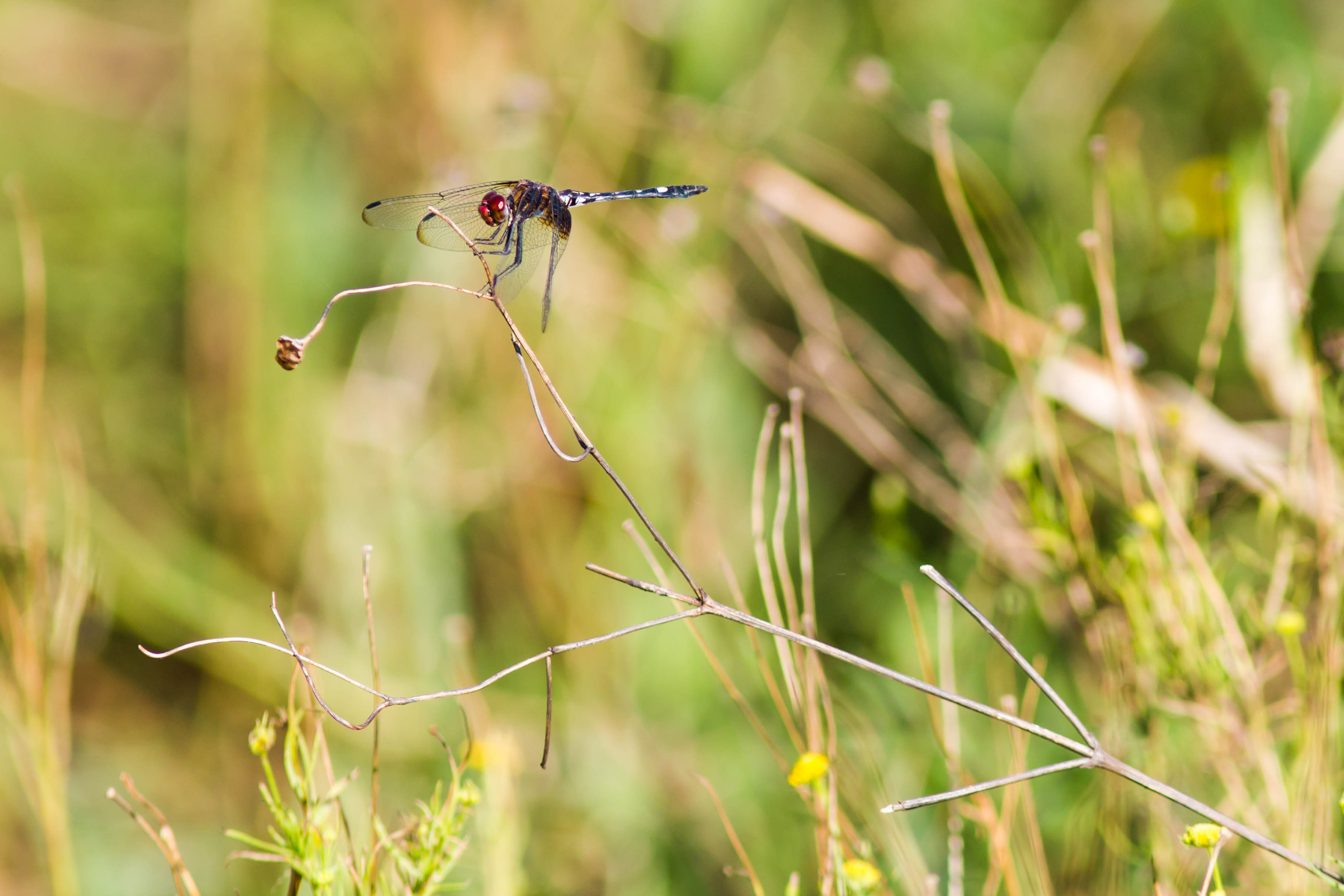

Conservation status
- Least Concern (IUCN 3.1)

Scientific classification
- Kingdom: Animalia
- Phylum: Arthropoda
- Class: Insecta
- Order: Odonata
- Infraorder: Anisoptera
- Family: Libellulidae
- Genus: Dythemis
- Species: D. fugax

Binomial name
- Dythemis fugax Hagen, 1861

= Dythemis fugax =

Species of dragonfly

Dythemis fugax, the checkered setwing, is a species of skimmer in the dragonfly family Libellulidae. It is found in Central America and North America.

The IUCN conservation status of Dythemis fugax is "LC", least concern, with no immediate threat to the species' survival. The population is stable. The IUCN status was reviewed in 2017.
