= Aethiothemis =

Scientific classification
- Kingdom: Animalia
- Phylum: Arthropoda
- Clade: Pancrustacea
- Class: Insecta
- Order: Odonata
- Infraorder: Anisoptera
- Superfamily: Libelluloidea
- Family: Libellulidae
- Subfamily: Libellulinae
- Genus: Aethiothemis; Martin, 1908

Genus of dragonflies

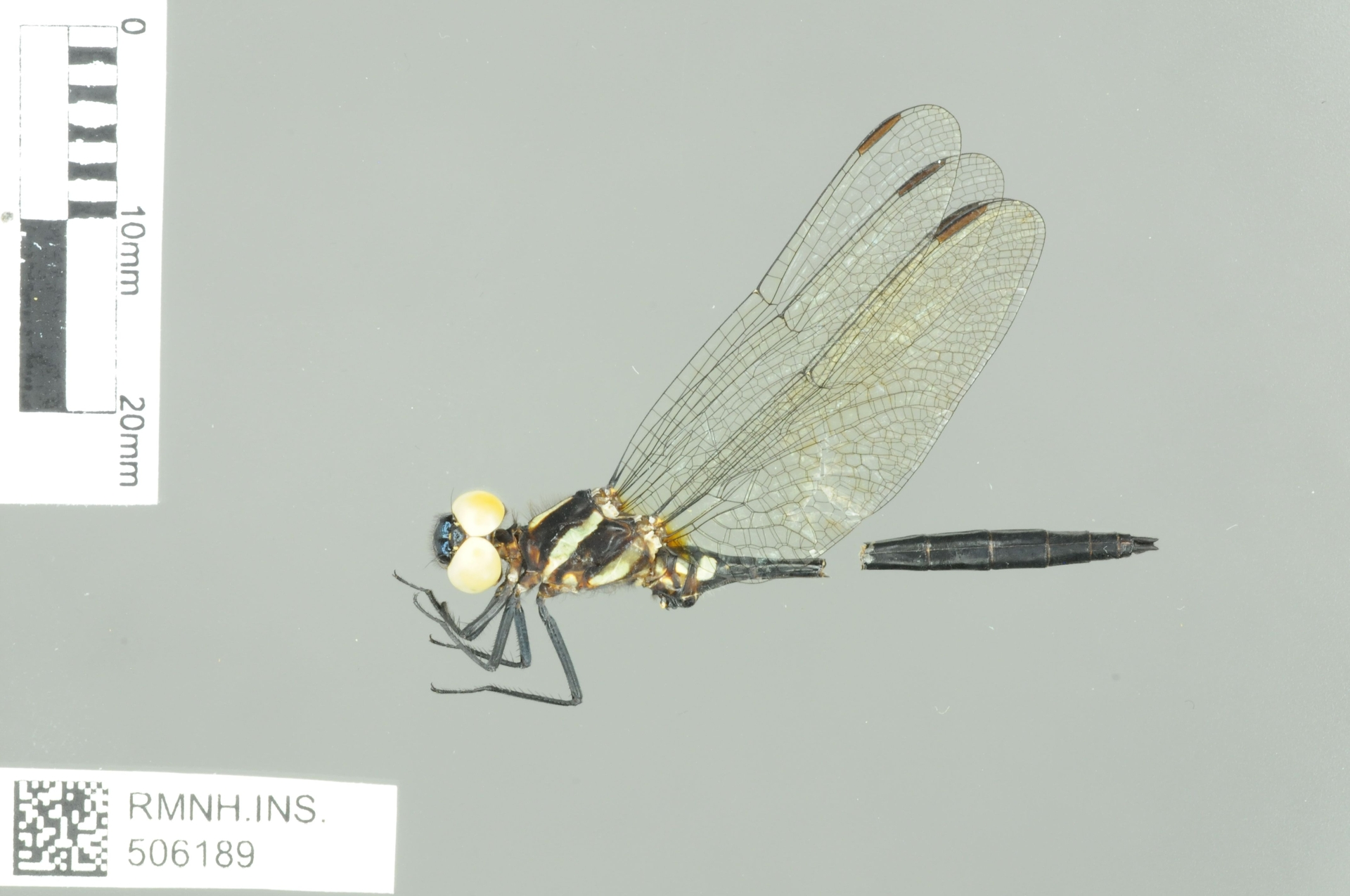

Aethiothemis is a small genus of dragonflies in the family Libellulidae.

Species include:

- Aethiothemis basilewskyi Fraser, 1954
- Aethiothemis bella (Fisher, 1939)
- Aethiothemis bequaerti Ris, 1919
- Aethiothemis carpenteri (Fraser, 1944)
- Aethiothemis diamangae Longfield, 1959
- Aethiothemis discrepans Lieftinck, 1969 – southern gorgeous skimmer
- Aethiothemis mediofasciata Ris, 1931 – orange flasher
- Aethiothemis palustris Martin, 1912
- Aethiothemis solitaria Martin, 1908
