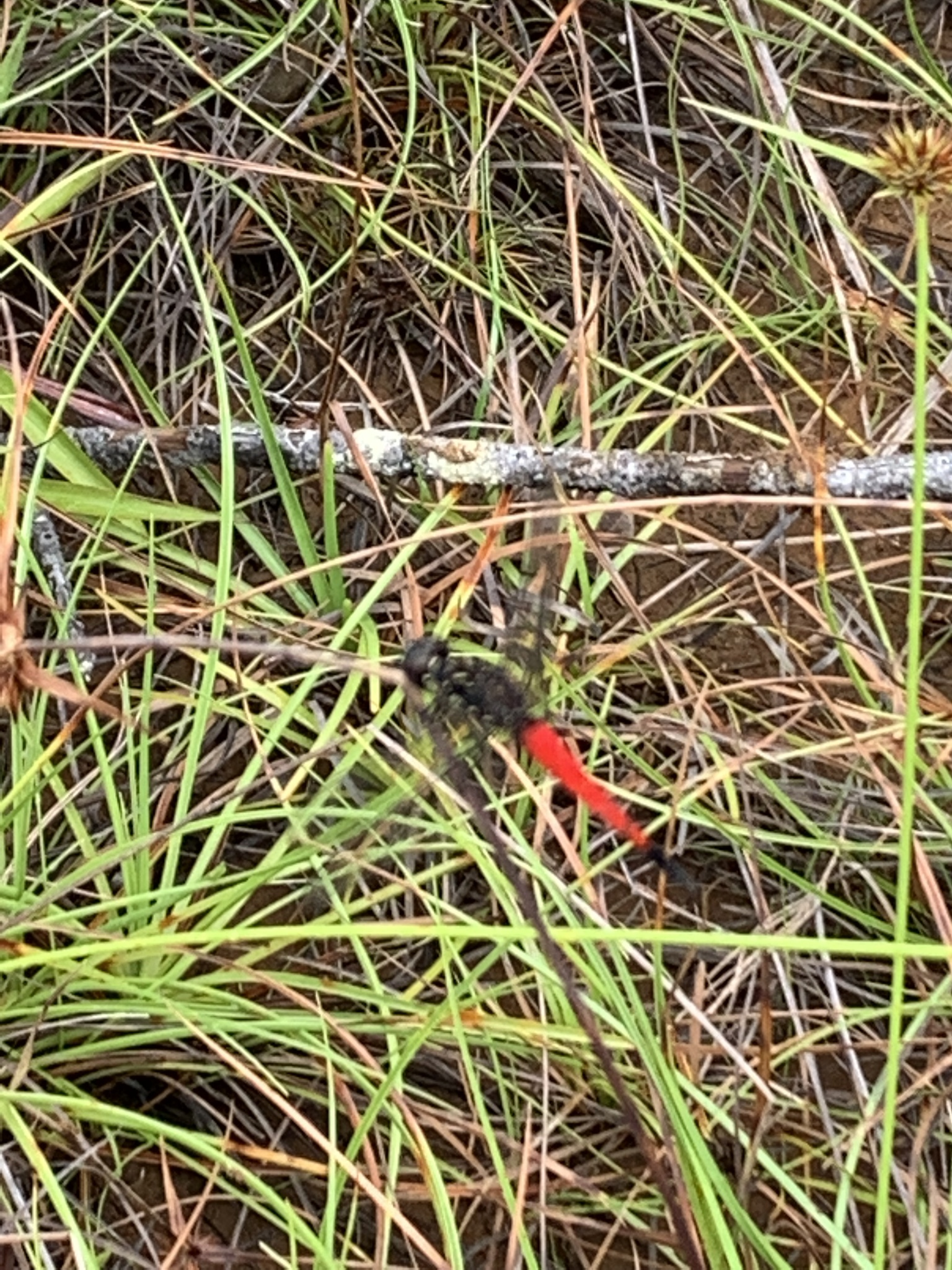

Conservation status
- Critically Endangered (IUCN 2.3)

Scientific classification
- Kingdom: Animalia
- Phylum: Arthropoda
- Class: Insecta
- Order: Odonata
- Infraorder: Anisoptera
- Family: Libellulidae
- Subfamily: Libellulinae
- Genus: Boninthemis
- Species: B. insularis

Binomial name
- Boninthemis insularis (Matsumura, 1913)

= Boninthemis =

Genus of dragonflies

Boninthemis is a monotypic genus of dragonflies in the family Libellulidae containing the single species Boninthemis insularis. It is endemic to Japan.
