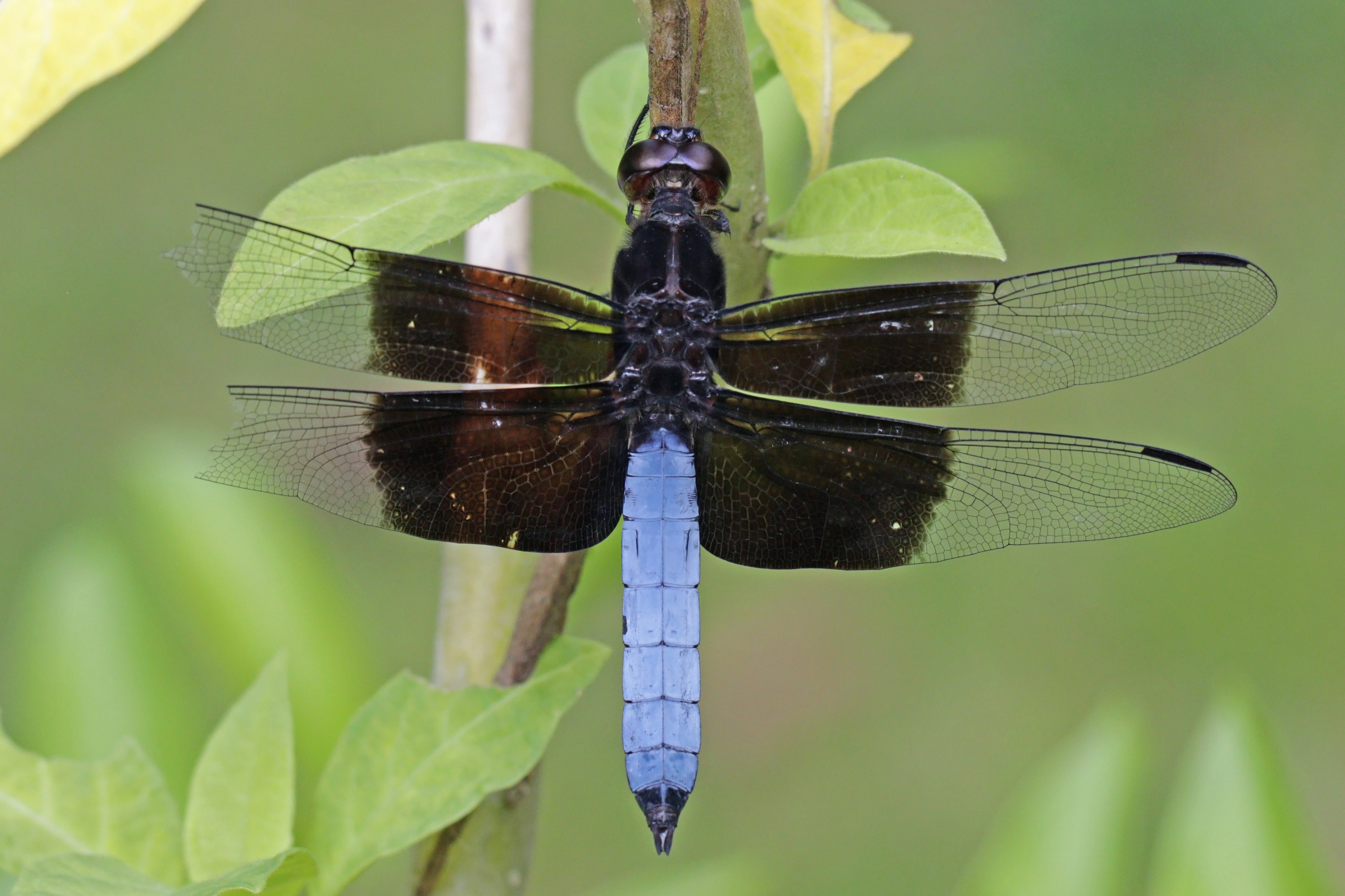
- Thermorthemis madagascariensis male

Scientific classification
- Domain: Eukaryota
- Kingdom: Animalia
- Phylum: Arthropoda
- Class: Insecta
- Order: Odonata
- Infraorder: Anisoptera
- Family: Libellulidae
- Genus: Thermorthemis
- Species: T. madagascariensis

Binomial name
- Thermorthemis madagascariensis (Rambur, 1842)

Synonyms
- Libellula madagascariensis Rambur, 1842; Donzella madegassa Navás, 1915

= Thermorthemis madagascariensis =

Species of dragonfly

Thermorthemis madagascariensis or Madagascar Jungle Skimmer is a species of dragonfly in the genus Thermorthemis endemic to Madagascar. It is the largest dragonfly on the island of Madagascar
