= Amphithemis (dragonfly) =

- Amphithemis curvistyla

Scientific classification
- Kingdom: Animalia
- Phylum: Arthropoda
- Clade: Pancrustacea
- Class: Insecta
- Order: Odonata
- Suborder: Anisoptera
- Superfamily: Libelluloidea
- Family: Libellulidae
- Subfamily: Libellulinae
- Genus: Amphithemis; Selys, 1891

Type species
- Amphithemis curvistyla

Genus of dragonfly

Amphithemis is a genus of dragonflies in the family Libellulidae.

Species:

- Amphithemis curvistyla Selys, 1891 Cambodia, Thailand
- Amphithemis kerri Fraser, 1933 Laos
- Amphithemis vacillans Selys, 1891 India
