= Hadrothemis coacta =

Conservation status
- Least Concern (IUCN 3.1)

Scientific classification
- Kingdom: Animalia
- Phylum: Arthropoda
- Class: Insecta
- Order: Odonata
- Infraorder: Anisoptera
- Family: Libellulidae
- Genus: Hadrothemis
- Species: H. coacta

Binomial name
- Hadrothemis coacta (Karsch, 1891)

Species of dragonfly

Hadrothemis coacta, the robust jungle-skimmer, is a species of dragonfly in the family Libellulidae. It is found in Angola, Cameroon, the Republic of the Congo, the Democratic Republic of the Congo, Ivory Coast, Equatorial Guinea, Gabon, Ghana, Liberia, Nigeria, and Uganda. Its natural habitats are subtropical or tropical moist lowland forests, shrub-dominated wetlands, and intermittent freshwater marshes.
