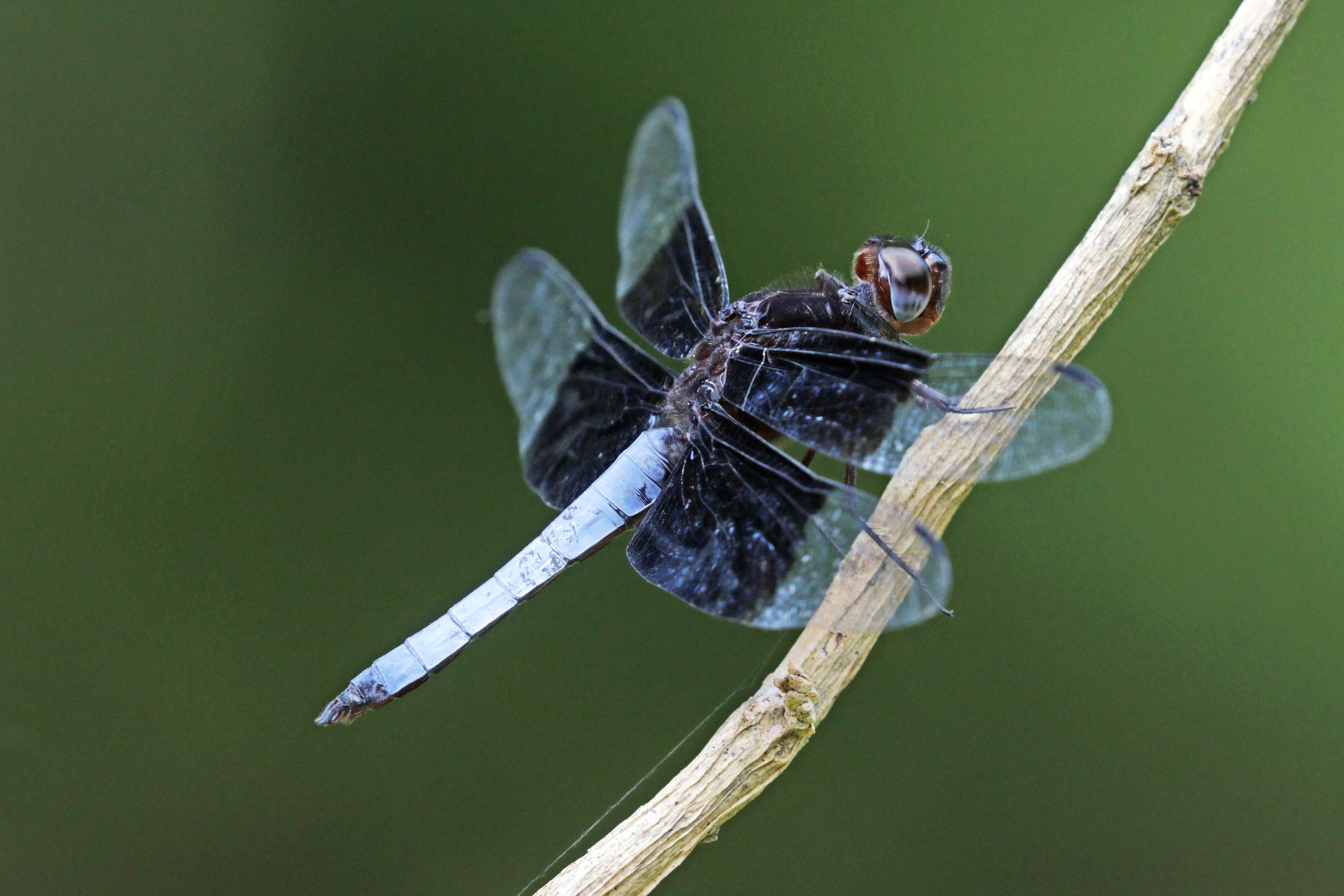
- Thermorthemis madagascariensis male

Scientific classification
- Kingdom: Animalia
- Phylum: Arthropoda
- Clade: Pancrustacea
- Class: Insecta
- Order: Odonata
- Infraorder: Anisoptera
- Superfamily: Libelluloidea
- Family: Libellulidae
- Subfamily: Libellulinae
- Genus: Thermorthemis; Kirby, 1889

Type species
- Thermorthemis madagascariensis

= Thermorthemis =

Genus of insects

Thermorthemis is a genus of dragonflies belonging to the family Libellulidae. Thermorthemis was first described by the entomologist Jules Pierre Rambur in 1842. There are two known species in this genus, T. madagascariensis, which is endemic to Madagascar, and T. comorensis, which is native to Comoros. T. madagascariensis has been synonymized with other former species, such as Libellula madagascariensis and Donzella madegassa. T. comorensis is considered a contentious species.

== Species ==
Male	Female	Scientific name	Common name	Distribution
		Thermorthemis comorensis Fraser, 1958		Comoros, Seychelles
		Thermorthemis madagascariensis (Rambur, 1842)	Madagascar Jungle Skimmer	Madagascar
