= Hadrothemis versuta =

Conservation status
- Least Concern (IUCN 3.1)

Scientific classification
- Kingdom: Animalia
- Phylum: Arthropoda
- Class: Insecta
- Order: Odonata
- Infraorder: Anisoptera
- Family: Libellulidae
- Genus: Hadrothemis
- Species: H. versuta

Binomial name
- Hadrothemis versuta (Karsch, 1891)

Species of dragonfly

Hadrothemis versuta is a species of dragonfly in the family Libellulidae. It is found in Cameroon, Central African Republic, the Republic of the Congo, the Democratic Republic of the Congo, Ivory Coast, Equatorial Guinea, Gabon, Guinea, Liberia, Nigeria, Uganda, and Zambia. Its natural habitats are subtropical or tropical moist lowland forests and intermittent freshwater marshes.
