= Aethiothemis bequaerti =

Conservation status
- Least Concern (IUCN 3.1)

Scientific classification
- Kingdom: Animalia
- Phylum: Arthropoda
- Class: Insecta
- Order: Odonata
- Infraorder: Anisoptera
- Family: Libellulidae
- Genus: Aethiothemis
- Species: A. bequaerti

Binomial name
- Aethiothemis bequaerti Ris, 1919

Species of dragonfly

Aethiothemis bequaerti is a species of dragonfly in the family Libellulidae. It is found in Angola, Malawi, Nigeria, Zambia, and possibly Mozambique. Its natural habitats are subtropical or tropical moist lowland forests, subtropical or tropical dry shrubland, swamps, and marshes.
