= Notolibellula =

Scientific classification
- Kingdom: Animalia
- Phylum: Arthropoda
- Clade: Pancrustacea
- Class: Insecta
- Order: Odonata
- Suborder: Anisoptera
- Superfamily: Libelluloidea
- Family: Libellulidae
- Subfamily: Libellulinae
- Genus: Notolibellula; Theischinger & Watson, 1977

Genus of dragonflies

Notolibellula is a genus of dragonflies in the family Libellulidae, endemic to northern Australia. The single known species is a medium-sized dragonfly with the male having a bluish thorax and a red end to his abdomen.

== Species ==
The genus Notolibellula includes only one species:

- Notolibellula bicolor Theischinger & Watson, 1977 - bicoloured skimmer

== Etymology ==
The genus name Notolibellula combines the Greek νότος (notos, "south wind", hence "southern") with Libellula, a predominantly European genus. The name refers to the southern or Australian distribution of the genus.

== See also ==
- List of Odonata species of Australia
