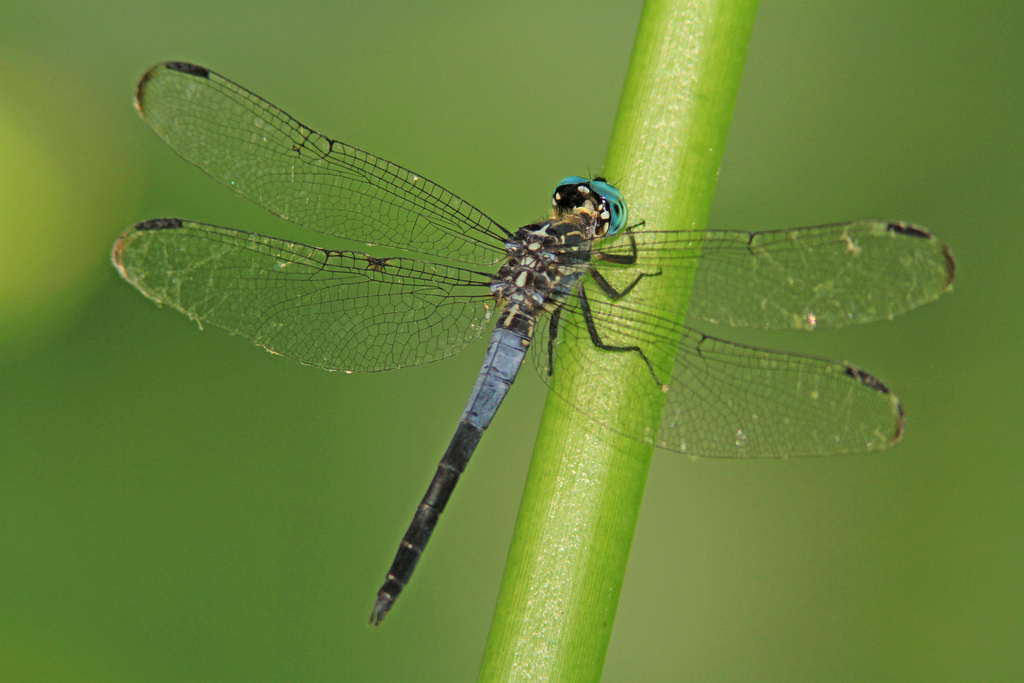
- Cannaphila insularis

Scientific classification
- Kingdom: Animalia
- Phylum: Arthropoda
- Class: Insecta
- Order: Odonata
- Infraorder: Anisoptera
- Family: Libellulidae
- Subfamily: Libellulinae
- Genus: Cannaphila; Kirby, 1889

Type species
- Cannaphila insularis

= Cannaphila =

Genus of dragonflies

Cannaphila is a small Neotropical genus of dragonflies in the family Libellulidae. They are commonly called narrow-winged skimmers. One species, C. insularis, occurs in North America. There are three species.

== Species ==
Species include:

Male	Female	Scientific name	Common Name	Distribution
		Cannaphila insularis Kirby, 1889	gray-waisted skimmer	Texas south to Panama
		Cannaphila mortoni Donnelly, 1992		Panama, Costa Rica
		Cannaphila vibex (Hagen, 1861)		widespread from Mexico to Argentina.
