= Notolibellula bicolor =

Bicoloured skimmer

Conservation status
- Least Concern (IUCN 3.1)

Scientific classification
- Kingdom: Animalia
- Phylum: Arthropoda
- Clade: Pancrustacea
- Class: Insecta
- Order: Odonata
- Suborder: Anisoptera
- Superfamily: Libelluloidea
- Family: Libellulidae
- Genus: Notolibellula
- Species: N. bicolor

Binomial name
- Notolibellula bicolor Theischinger & Watson, 1977

Species of dragonfly

Notolibellula bicolor is a species of dragonfly in the family Libellulidae, known as the bicoloured skimmer. It is the only known species of Notolibellula. It is found across northern Australia where it inhabits rock-holes and still waters. It is a medium-sized dragonfly with the male having a bluish thorax and a red end to his abdomen.

== Etymology ==
The genus name Notolibellula combines the Greek νότος (notos, "south wind", hence "southern") with Libellula, a predominantly European genus. The name refers to the southern or Australian distribution of the genus.

The species name bicolor is Latin for "two-coloured" or "of two colours", referring to the vivid red and blue colouration.

== Gallery ==
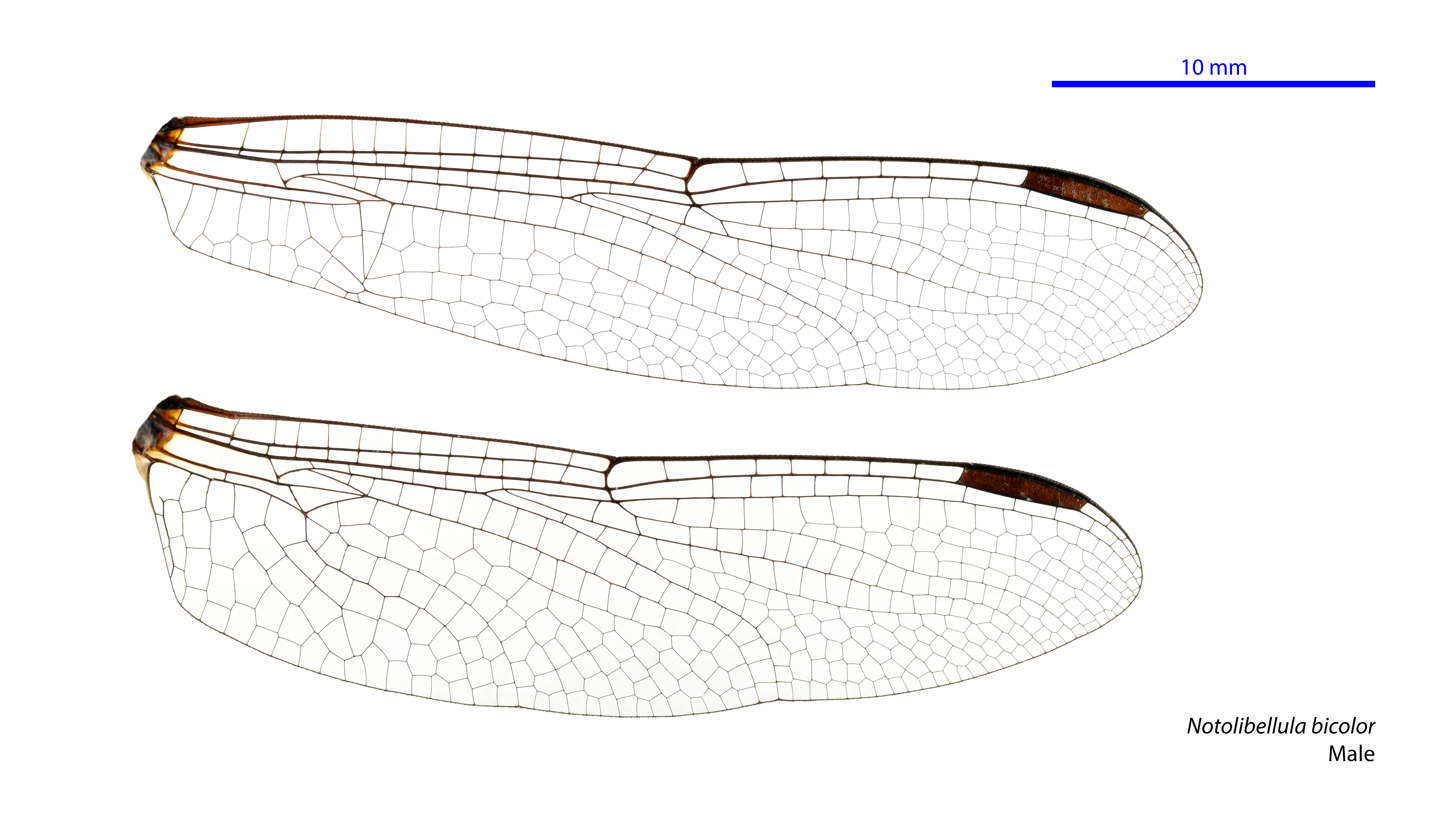
Male wings

== See also ==
- List of Odonata species of Australia
