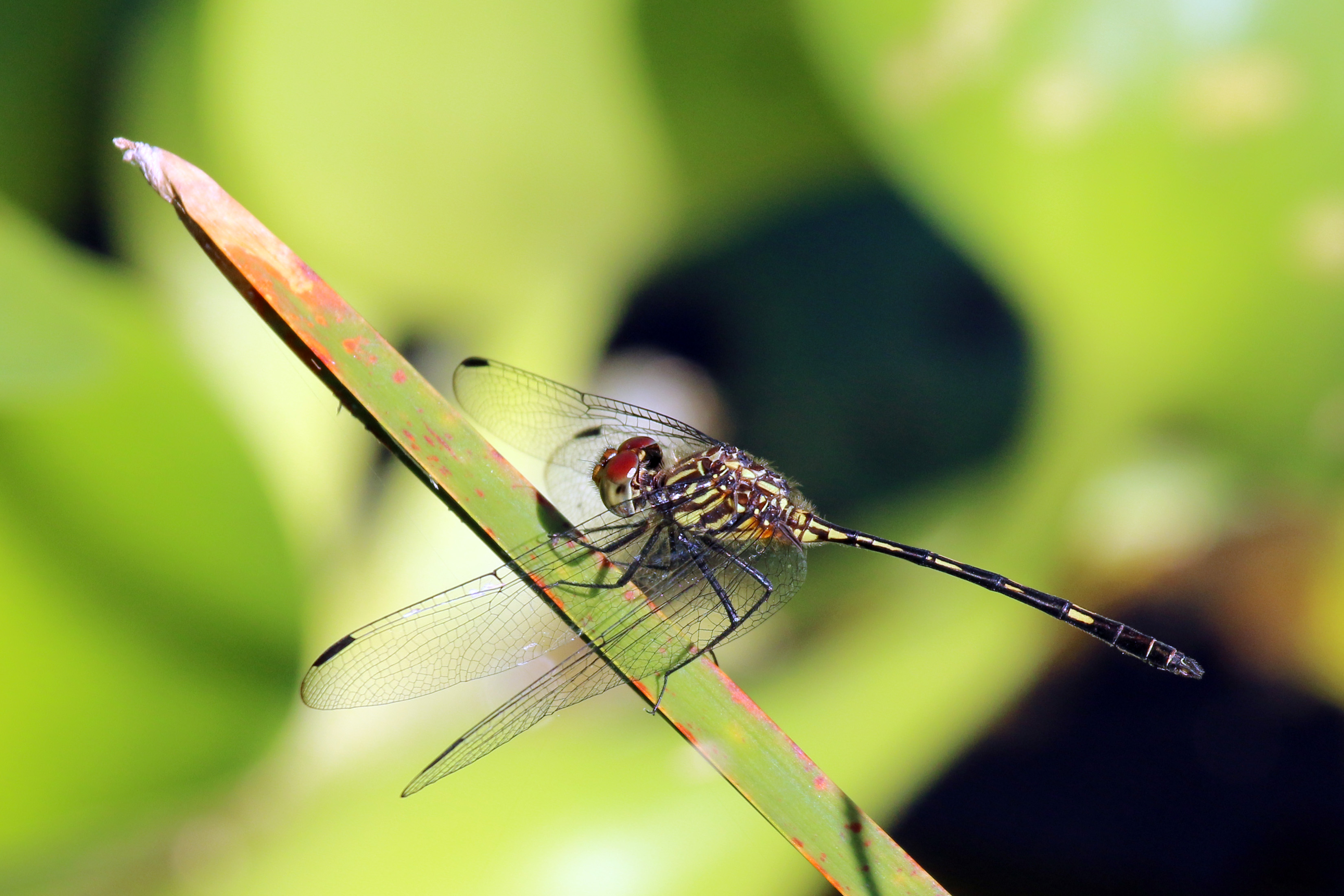
- D. sterilis, Tobago

Scientific classification
- Kingdom: Animalia
- Phylum: Arthropoda
- Class: Insecta
- Order: Odonata
- Infraorder: Anisoptera
- Family: Libellulidae
- Subfamily: Trithemistinae
- Genus: Dythemis; Hagen, 1861

Species
- See text

= Dythemis =

Genus of dragonflies

Dythemis is a Neotropical genus of dragonflies in the Libellulidae family, commonly known as Setwings.

There are seven species. In 2011, it was proposed that D. multipunctata be made a subspecies of D. sterilis, and individuals of the species in the Lesser Antilles be called D. nigra.

== Species ==
The genus includes the following species:

Male	Female	Scientific name	Common name	Distribution
		Dythemis fugax Hagen, 1861	Checkered Setwing	Central America and North America
		Dythemis maya Calvert, 1906	Mayan Setwing	Central America and North America
		Dythemis nigra Martin, 1897		South America
		Dythemis nigrescens Calvert, 1899	Black Setwing	Central America and North America
		Dythemis rufinervis (Burmeister, 1839)		Caribbean
		Dythemis sterilis Hagen, 1861	Brown Setwing	Mexico and the Caribbean south through Central America
		Dythemis velox Hagen, 1861	Swift Setwing	Central America and North America
