= Aethiothemis palustris =

Conservation status
- Least Concern (IUCN 3.1)

Scientific classification
- Kingdom: Animalia
- Phylum: Arthropoda
- Class: Insecta
- Order: Odonata
- Infraorder: Anisoptera
- Family: Libellulidae
- Genus: Aethiothemis
- Species: A. palustris

Binomial name
- Aethiothemis palustris Martin, 1912

Species of dragonfly

Aethiothemis palustris is a species of dragonfly in the family Libellulidae. It is found in Côte d'Ivoire, Ghana, Guinea, Guinea-Bissau, Mali, Nigeria, possibly Ethiopia, and possibly Uganda.
