= Aethiothemis solitaria =

Conservation status
- Least Concern (IUCN 3.1)

Scientific classification
- Kingdom: Animalia
- Phylum: Arthropoda
- Class: Insecta
- Order: Odonata
- Infraorder: Anisoptera
- Family: Libellulidae
- Genus: Aethiothemis
- Species: A. solitaria

Binomial name
- Aethiothemis solitaria Martin, 1908

Species of dragonfly

Aethiothemis solitaria is a species of dragonfly in the family Libellulidae. It is found in Angola, Botswana, Guinea, Guinea-Bissau, Namibia, Nigeria, Sierra Leone, Togo, Uganda, Zambia, possibly Malawi, and possibly Tanzania. Its natural habitats are subtropical or tropical moist lowland forests, dry savanna, moist savanna, subtropical or tropical dry shrubland, subtropical or tropical moist shrubland, swamps, and marshes.
