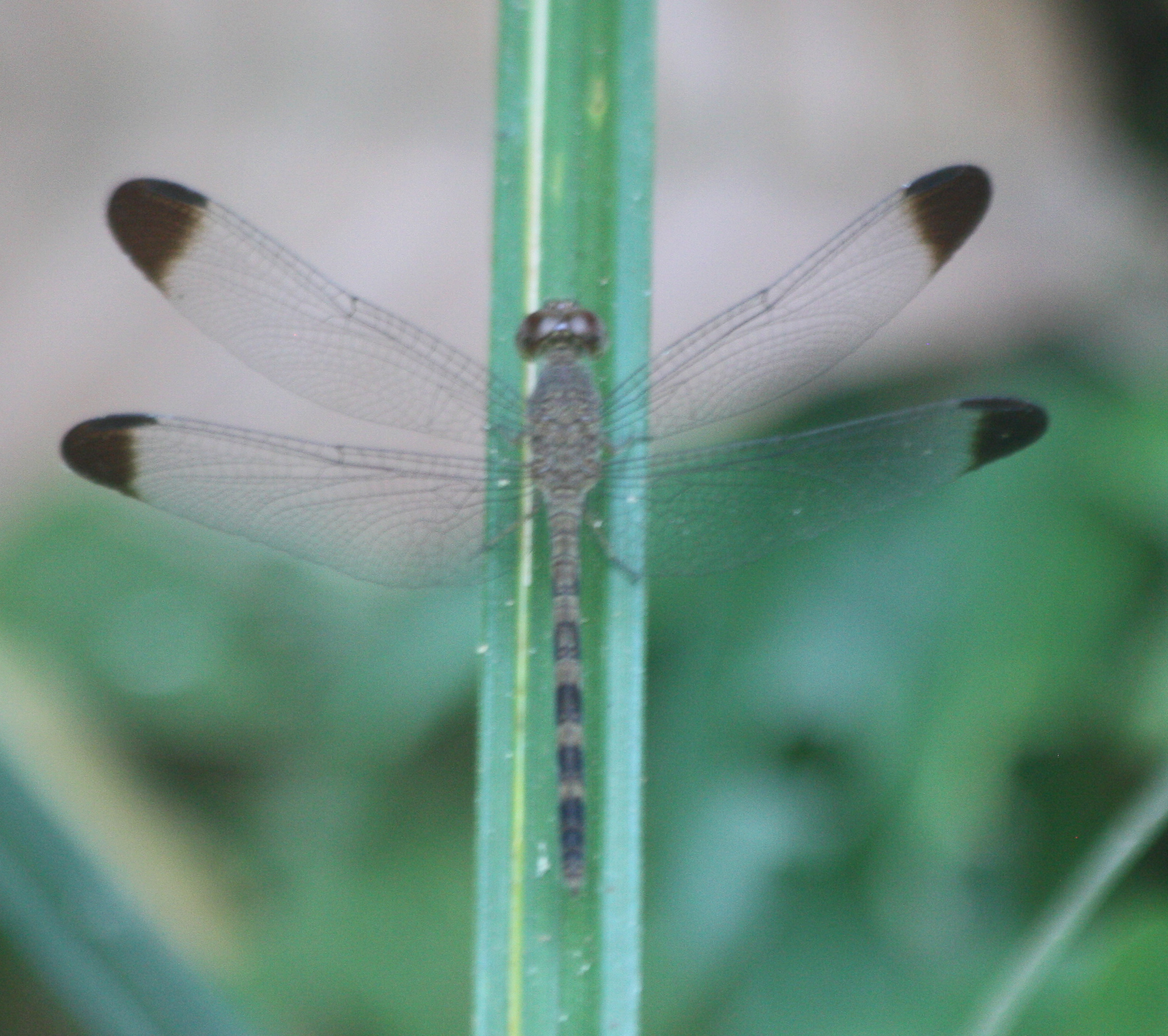

Scientific classification
- Kingdom: Animalia
- Phylum: Arthropoda
- Clade: Pancrustacea
- Class: Insecta
- Order: Odonata
- Suborder: Anisoptera
- Superfamily: Libelluloidea
- Family: Libellulidae
- Subfamily: Brachydiplacinae
- Genus: Uracis; Rambur, 1842

= Uracis =

Genus of dragonflies

Uracis is a genus of dragonfly from the family Libellulidae. The genus was first described by Jules Pierre Rambur.

== Description ==
Uracis species are medium-sized dragonflies and grow to be 28 to 40 millimeters tall. The color of the abdomen of colored males is mostly bluish with a grayish-white coating. The part of the thorax to which the wings attach, the so-called pterothorax, is grayish, but with age it takes on the same bluish hue as the abdomen. The wings are transparent except for the brownish tinted wing tips. It can also happen that the wings have brown ribbons due to polymorphism. Like the vertex, the postfrons are black. There are also two tubercles on the vertex, which allow a distinction to Ypirangathemis species. Similar to representatives of Erythrodiplax, Nannothemis, Pseudoleon and Ypirangathemis, the last segment of the vesica spermalis is long and cylindrical.

== Species ==
Male	Female	Scientific name	Common name	Distribution
		Uracis fastigiata (Burmeister, 1839)		Mexico to Brazil, Peru
		Uracis imbuta (Burmeister, 1839)	tropical woodskimmer	Mexico to Brazil
		Uracis infumata (Rambur, 1842)		Brazil, Peru
		Uracis ovipositrix Calvert, 1909		Peru, Brazil, Guyanas
		Uracis reducta Fraser, 1946		Peru
		Uracis siemensi Kirby, 1897		Tropical South America
		Uracis turrialba Ris, 1919		Costa Rica
