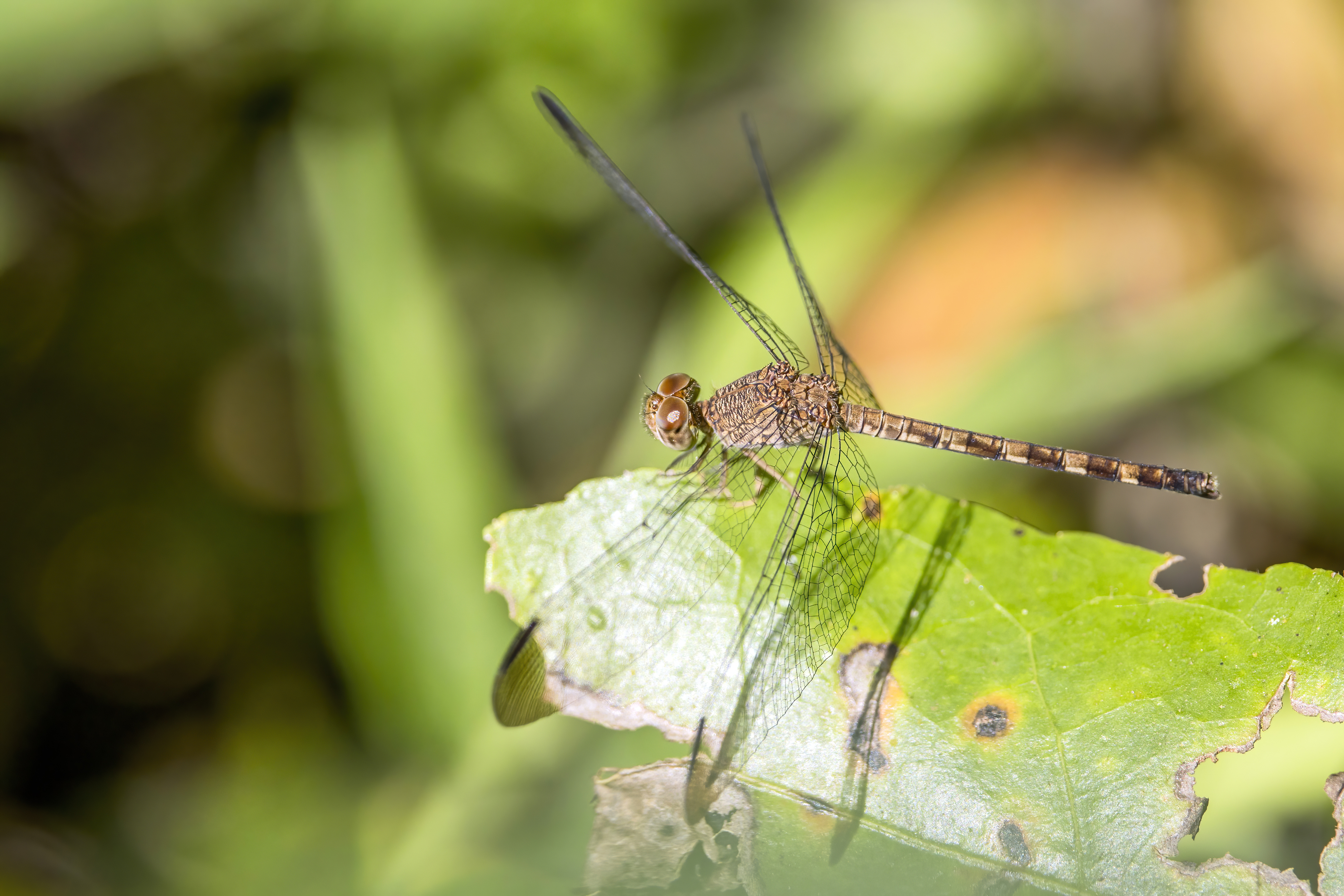
- Female, Guatemala

Conservation status
- Least Concern (IUCN 3.1)

Scientific classification
- Kingdom: Animalia
- Phylum: Arthropoda
- Class: Insecta
- Order: Odonata
- Infraorder: Anisoptera
- Family: Libellulidae
- Genus: Uracis
- Species: U. imbuta

Binomial name
- Uracis imbuta Burmeister, 1839

= Uracis imbuta =

Species of insect

Uracis imbuta, also known by its common name tropical woodskimmer, is a species of dragonfly from the genus Uracis. The species was first described by Hermann Burmeister in 1839.
