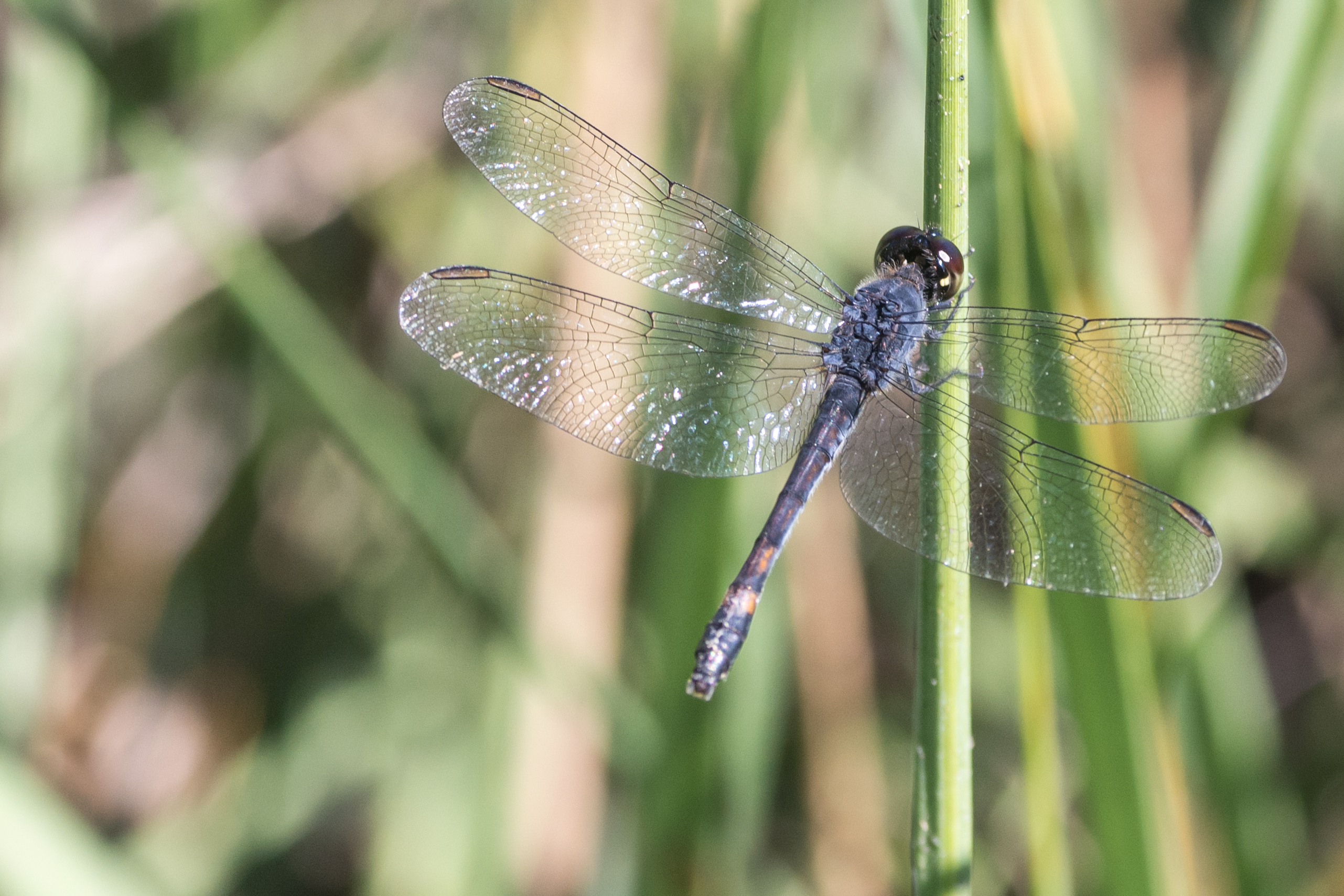

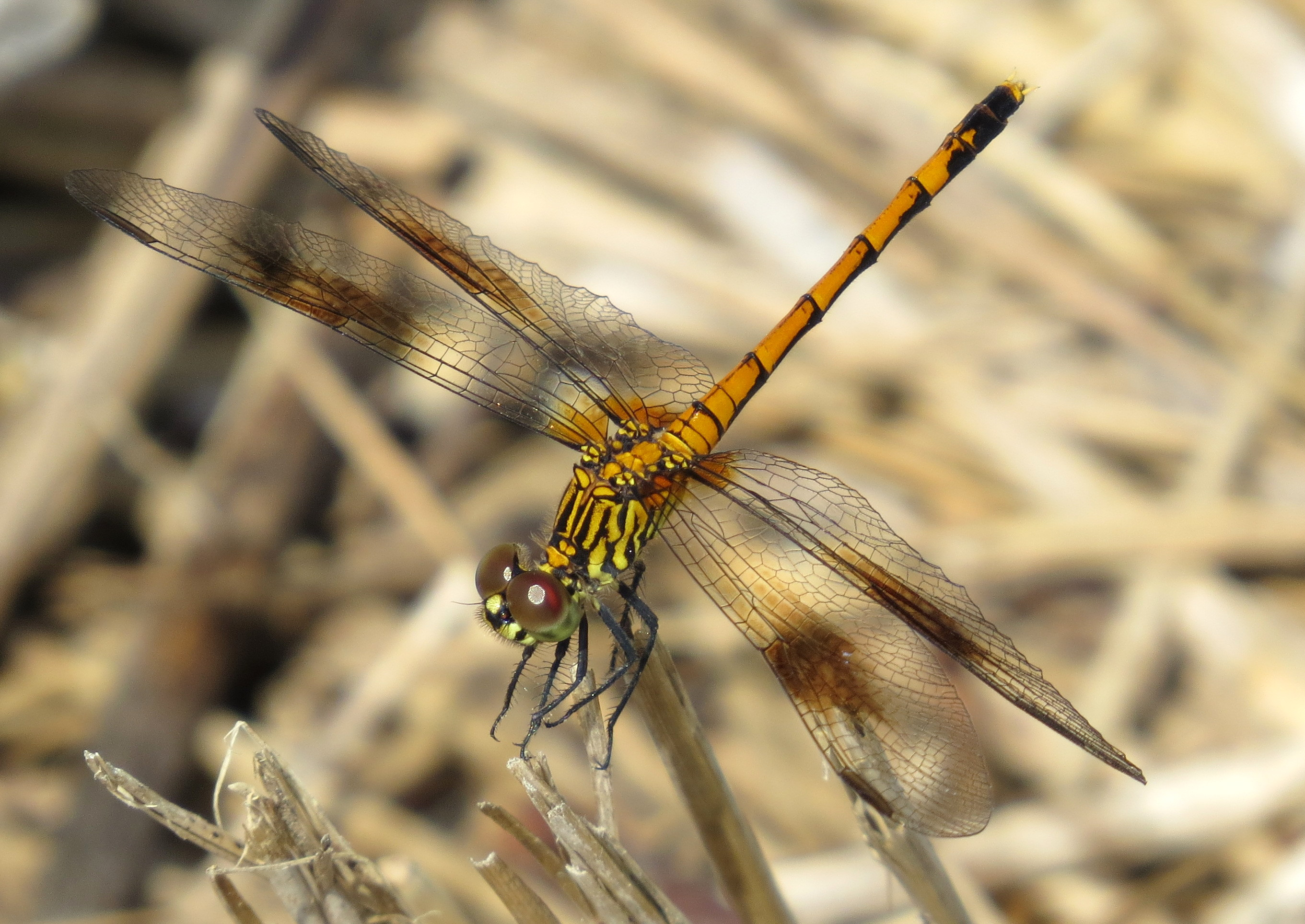
- Male (top) and female (bottom)

Conservation status
- Least Concern (IUCN 3.1)

Scientific classification
- Kingdom: Animalia
- Phylum: Arthropoda
- Clade: Pancrustacea
- Class: Insecta
- Order: Odonata
- Infraorder: Anisoptera
- Superfamily: Libelluloidea
- Family: Libellulidae
- Genus: Erythrodiplax
- Species: E. berenice

Binomial name
- Erythrodiplax berenice (Drury, 1773)

Synonyms
- Erythrodiplax berenice ssp. naeva (Hagen, 1861); Libellula berenice Drury, 1773; Libellula histrio Burmeister, 1839

= Erythrodiplax berenice =

Seaside dragonlet

Species of dragonfly

Erythrodiplax berenice, commonly known as the seaside dragonlet, is a species of dragonfly in the family Libellulidae. It is found mainly at coastal marshes, mangrove swamps, and alkaline lakes of eastern North America. It is unique among dragonflies of the western hemisphere in that it can breed in seawater.

== Description ==
The seaside dragonlet is a relatively small, slender-bodied skimmer. Males reach a uniform black at maturity, which is then overlaid with waxy pruinosity. Their eyes are dark red on top with a gradient to light green below. Females have a similar dark red to light green-gray eye color gradient, but their body coloration is much more variable than the males'. The thorax usually has a lemon yellow to orange background with many black stripes, but some have an entirely black thorax. The abdomen is often black (sometimes gold or orange) on the first three segments (S1-S3) and on the final segments (S8-S10). The middle segments (S4-S7) are then often orange above and black below, forming a chainlike pattern of orange. Some common female color patterns include: mostly bright orange on thorax and abdomen; black thorax with bright orange abdomen (aging to a masculine-appearing black abdomen); orange thorax with black stripes and black abdomen.

== Similar species ==
This species appears the most similar to the black meadowhawk and the double-ringed pennant, but they are found in freshwater habitats, meaning they would appear in the same habitat by accidental (e.g. windblown) dispersal.

The blue dasher and slaty skimmer have a pruinose coloration similar to mature males and mature dark females, but both have a thicker, more robust abdomen and bluer color. The slaty skimmer is also much larger (50–52 mm) with no size overlap with the seaside dragonlet (31–35 mm).

== Regional variation ==
Brown wing spots behind the nodus are more common in northerly populations. Tropical populations in the Florida Keys to the West Indies have been considered to belong to the subspecies Erythrodiplax berenice naeva. Females lack brown wing spots and are more often pruinose than in subtropical to temperate populations.

== Behavior ==
While not as territorial as other dragonlet species, males may display some aggression to each other at close range. Large numbers of both sexes gather in good breeding habitat. This species is often found perching on emergent vegetation or trees, spending 99% of their time perched on vegetation in a study of their behavior in a Maine salt marsh. It feeds on smaller insects including lacewings and damselflies. Pairs of seaside dragonlets often fly in tandem and are unique within the genus Erythrodiplax for also performing oviposition in tandem, usually into floating algal mats.

== Saltwater tolerance ==
Nymphal development often occurs in brackish waters, but can occur in freshwater to saltwater environments. Nymph development has been recorded as frequently occurring in mangrove forests in waters up to 48 ppm salt (open ocean seawater is 35 ppm on average). In a laboratory experiment, nymphs tolerated salinity up to 260% the concentration of seawater, but could not withstand 300%.
