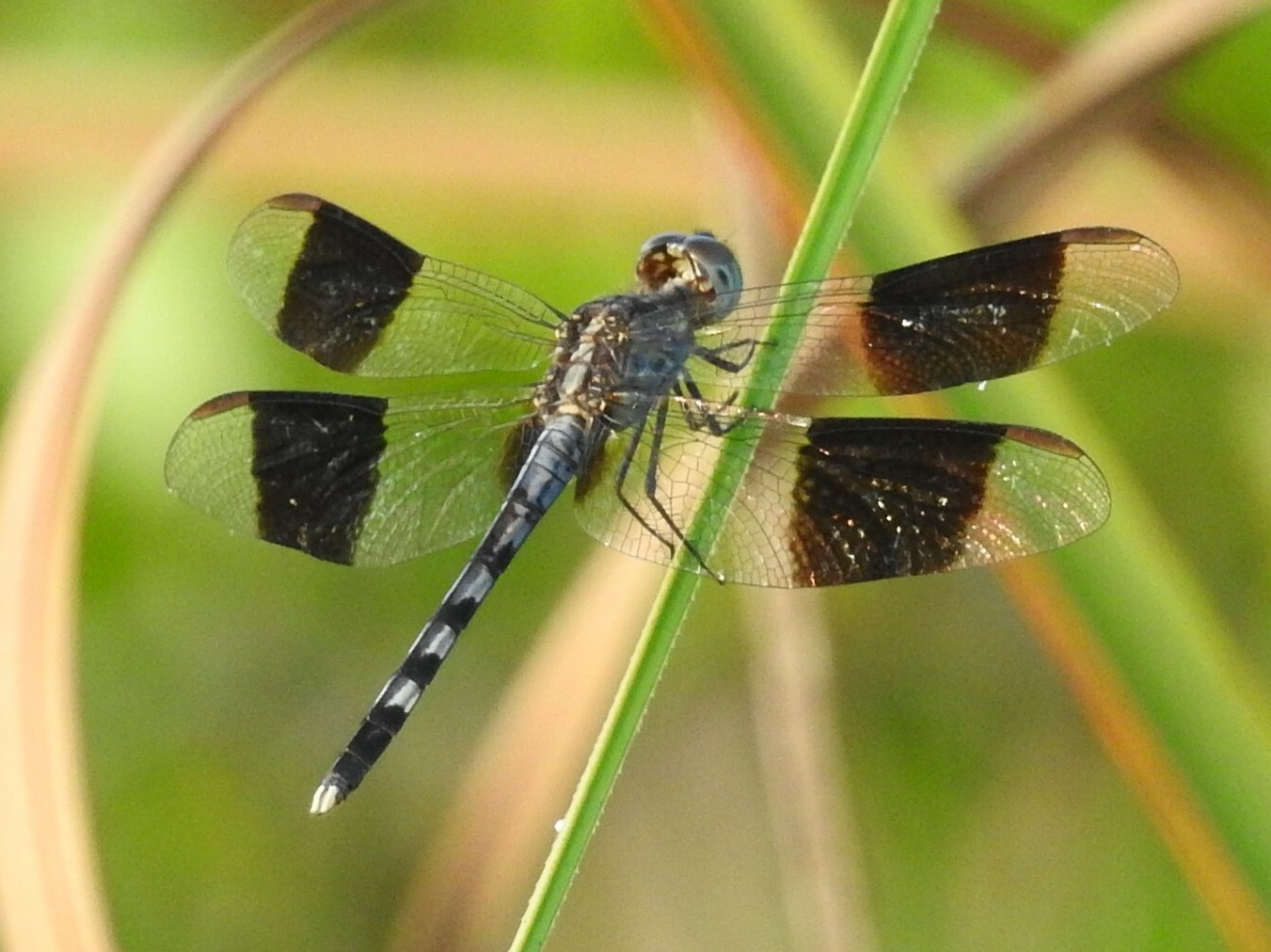
- Male in the Florida Keys, USA
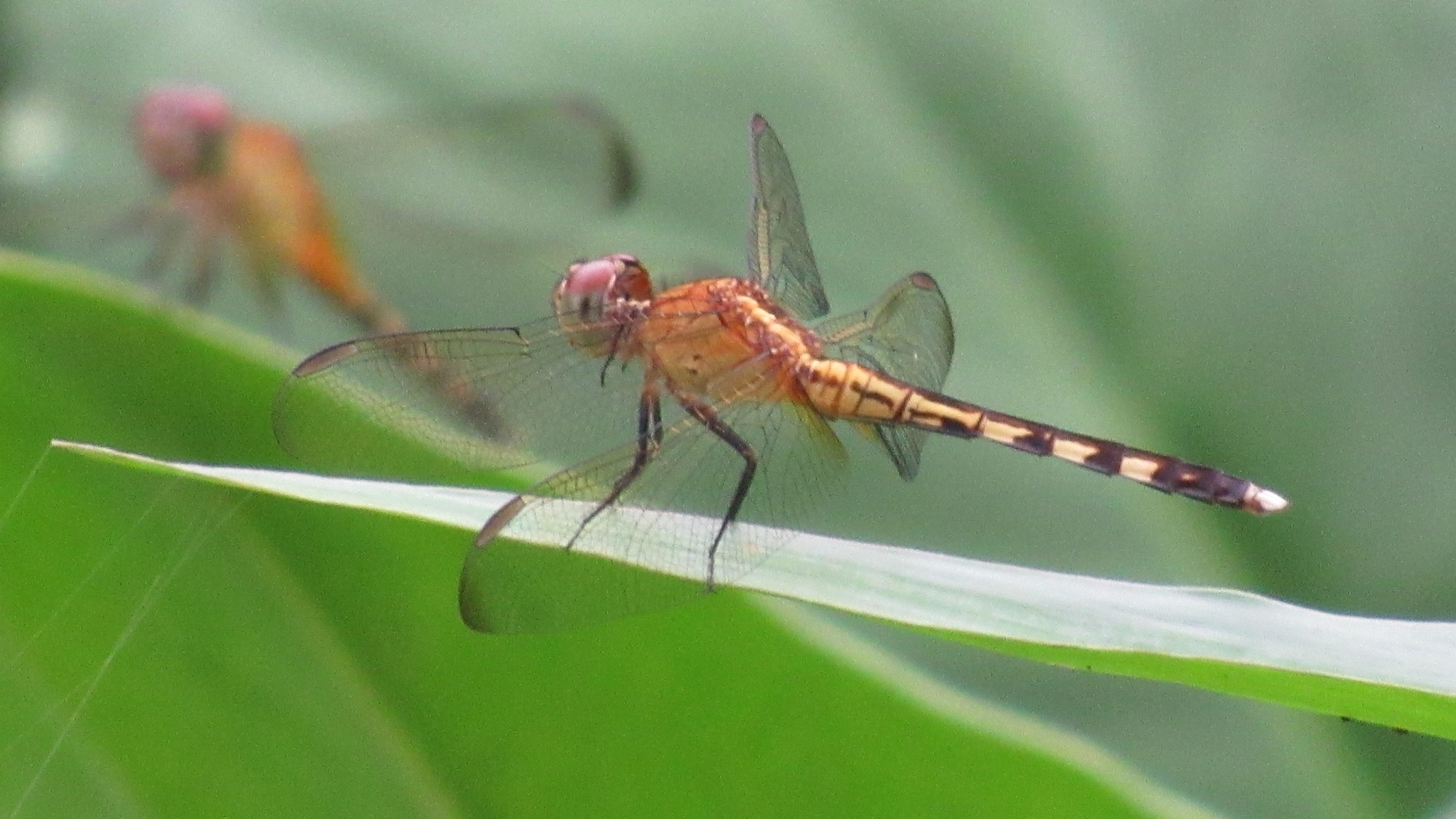
- Female

Conservation status
- Least Concern (IUCN 3.1)

Scientific classification
- Kingdom: Animalia
- Phylum: Arthropoda
- Class: Insecta
- Order: Odonata
- Infraorder: Anisoptera
- Family: Libellulidae
- Genus: Erythrodiplax
- Species: E. umbrata

Binomial name
- Erythrodiplax umbrata (Linnaeus, 1758)

= Erythrodiplax umbrata =

Species of dragonfly

Erythrodiplax umbrata, the band-winged dragonlet, is a species of skimmer in the dragonfly family Libellulidae. It is found in the Caribbean Sea, Central America, North America, and South America.

The IUCN conservation status of Erythrodiplax umbrata is "LC", least concern, with no immediate threat to the species' survival. The population is stable. The IUCN status was reviewed in 2017.

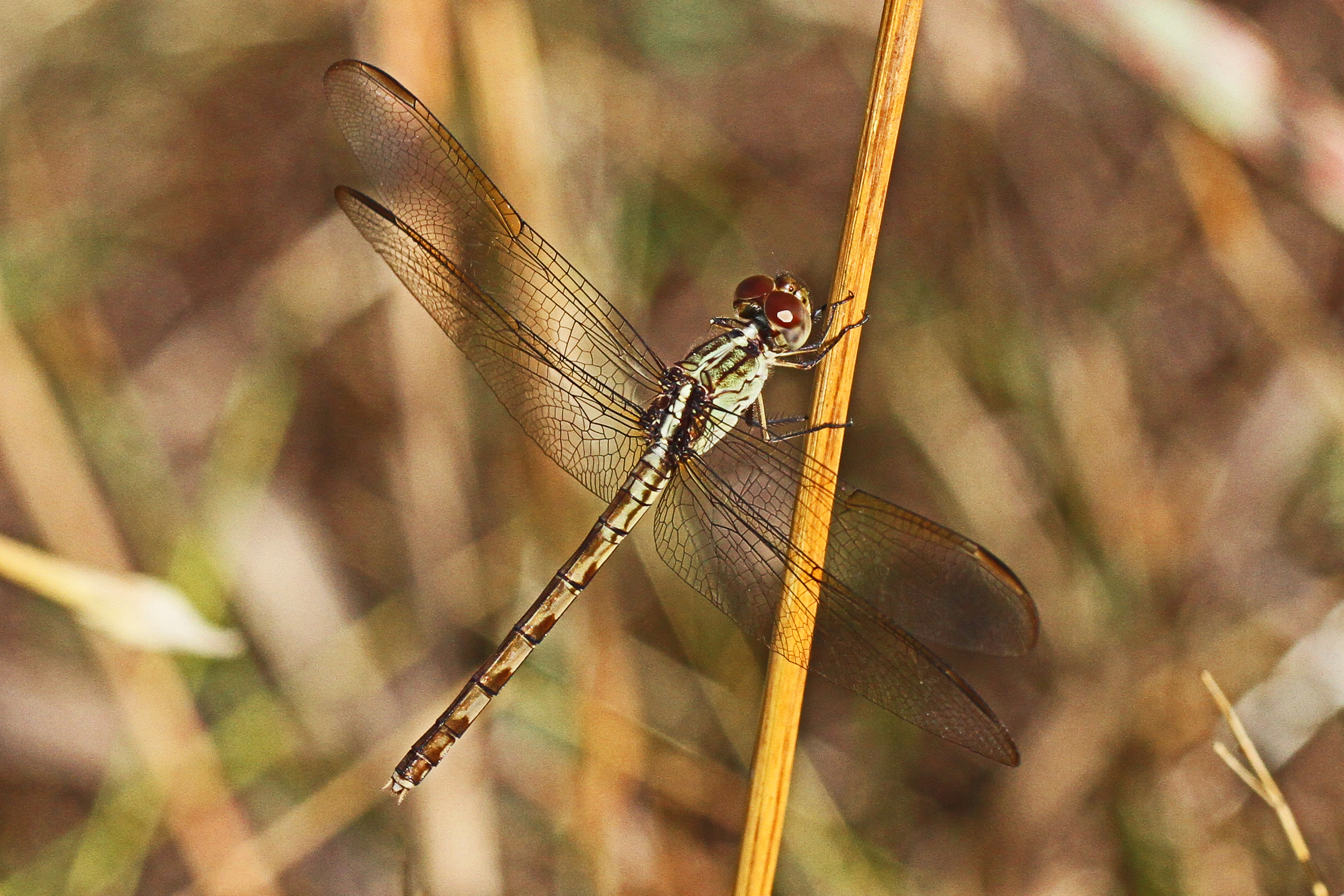
Band-winged dragonlet, Erythrodiplax umbrata

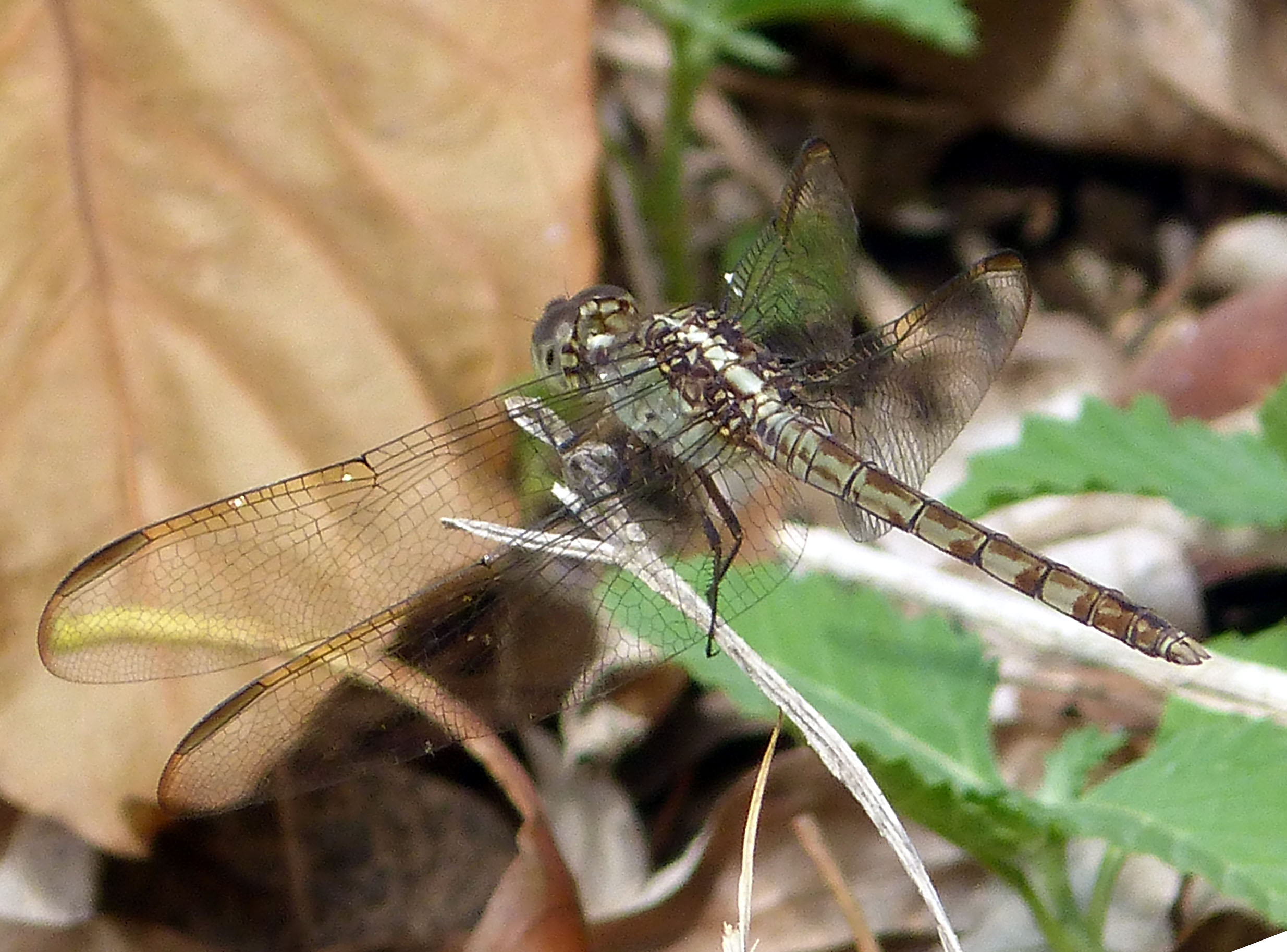
Band-winged dragonlet, Erythrodiplax umbrata
