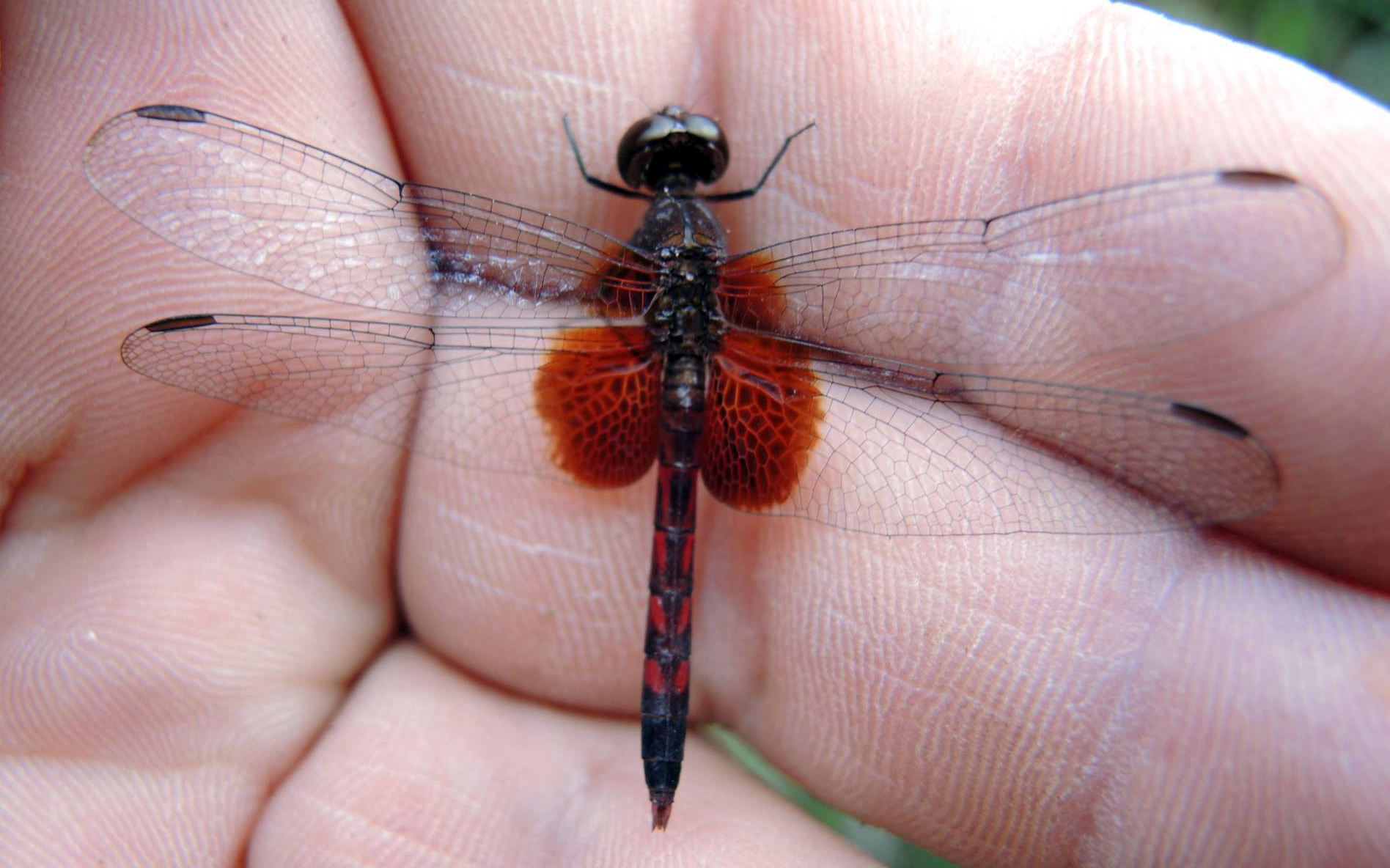

Conservation status
- Least Concern (IUCN 3.1)

Scientific classification
- Kingdom: Animalia
- Phylum: Arthropoda
- Class: Insecta
- Order: Odonata
- Infraorder: Anisoptera
- Family: Libellulidae
- Genus: Erythrodiplax
- Species: E. fervida

Binomial name
- Erythrodiplax fervida (Erichson, 1848)

= Erythrodiplax fervida =

Species of dragonfly

Erythrodiplax fervida is a species of skimmer in the dragonfly family Libellulidae. It is found in the Caribbean Sea and South America.

The IUCN conservation status of Erythrodiplax fervida is "LC", least concern, with no immediate threat to the species' survival. The population is stable. The IUCN status was reviewed in 2017.

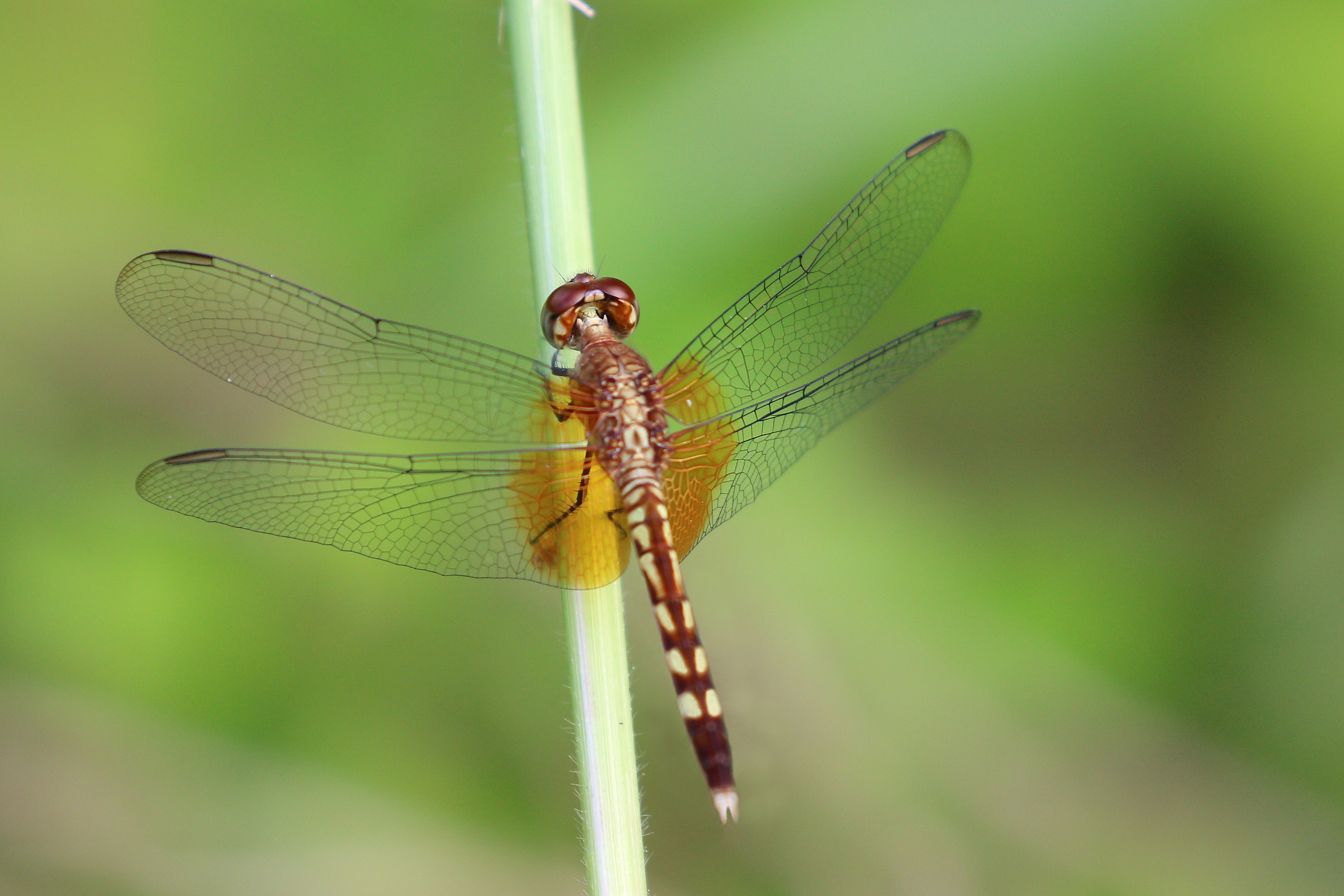
