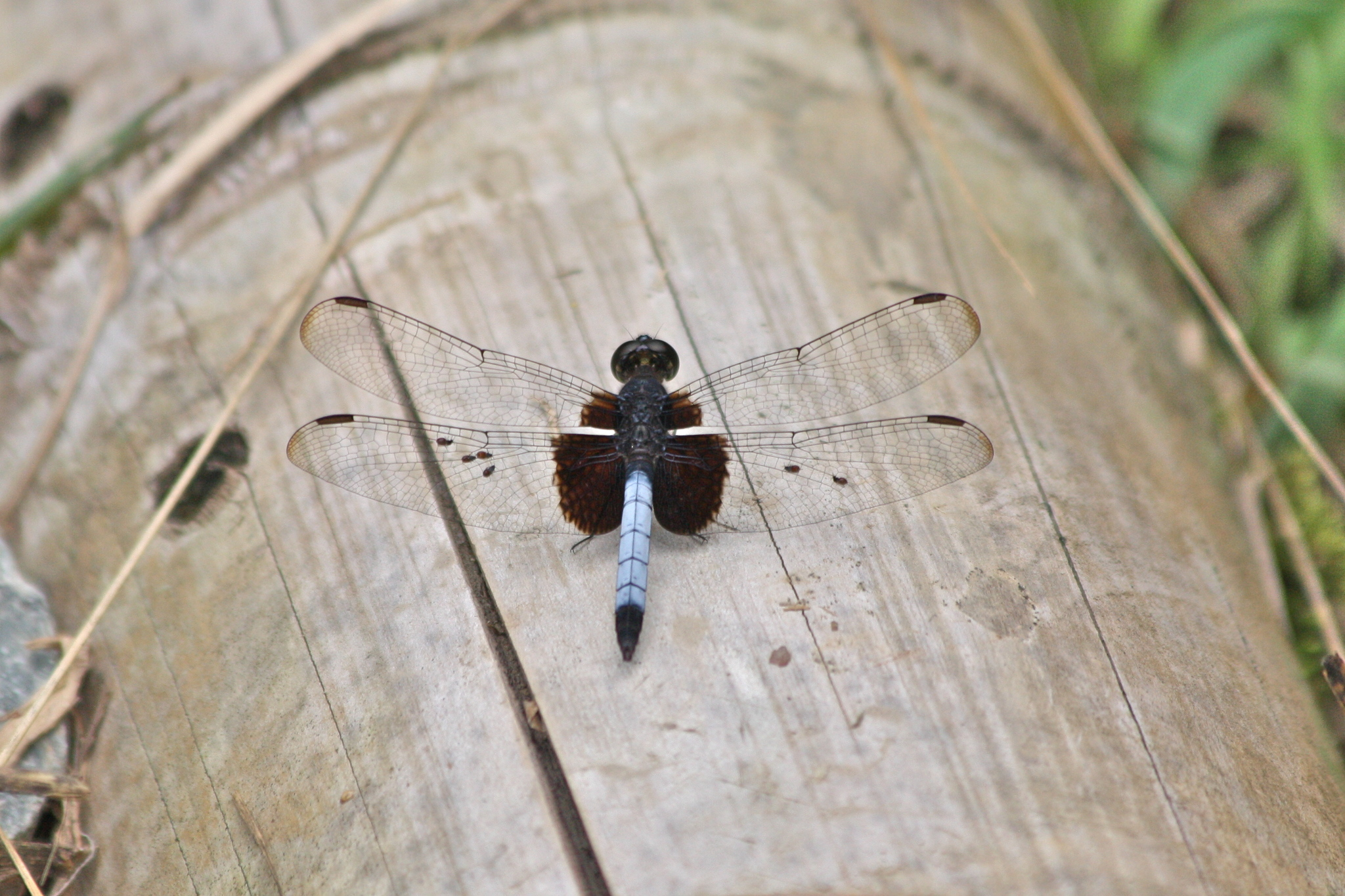

Scientific classification
- Kingdom: Animalia
- Phylum: Arthropoda
- Class: Insecta
- Order: Odonata
- Infraorder: Anisoptera
- Family: Libellulidae
- Genus: Erythrodiplax
- Species: E. unimaculata

Binomial name
- Erythrodiplax unimaculata Degeer, 1773

= Erythrodiplax unimaculata =

Species of insect

Erythrodiplax unimaculata, also known by its common name white-tailed dragonlet is a species from the genus Erythrodiplax.

== Description ==
This species has wings with brown tips, but female samples often only have basal spots on the wings. Forewings can have a yellowish shadow. For the hind wings the red-yellow color is somewhat more widespread, diffuse anteriorly and not very sharp up to the 1st antenodal transverse artery and on or a little over the transverse artery of the submedian space

== Taxonomy ==
Erythrodiplax unimaculata was first described by Charles De Geer in 1773. Monophyly has not yet been determined

== Range ==
Observation of Erythrodiplax unimaculata have been documented in Brazil, Colombia and Peru. Observations aggregated in the Global Biodiversity Information Facility suggest a more wide spread range in the northern have of South America.
