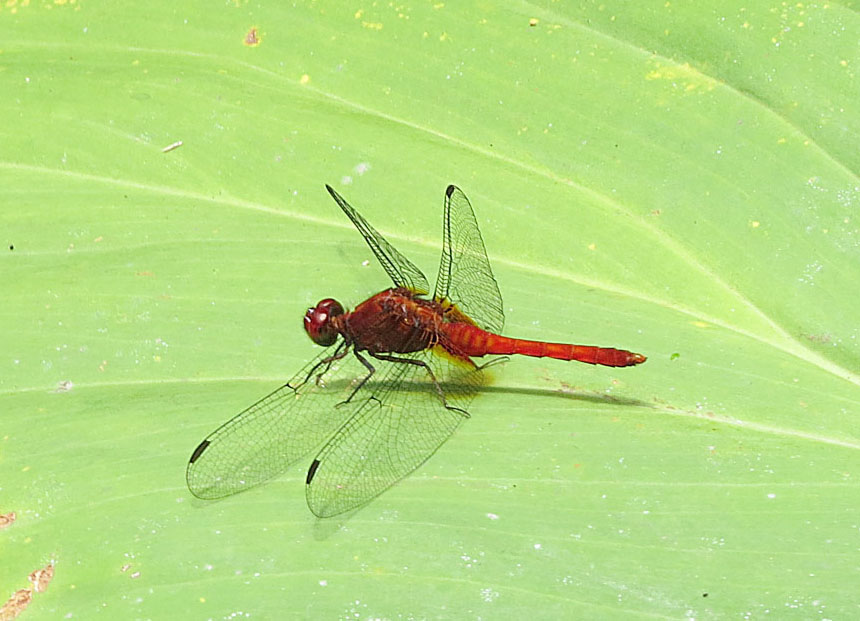

Conservation status
- Least Concern (IUCN 3.1)

Scientific classification
- Kingdom: Animalia
- Phylum: Arthropoda
- Class: Insecta
- Order: Odonata
- Infraorder: Anisoptera
- Family: Libellulidae
- Genus: Erythrodiplax
- Species: E. fusca

Binomial name
- Erythrodiplax fusca (Rambur, 1842)

= Erythrodiplax fusca =

Species of dragonfly

Erythrodiplax fusca, the red-faced dragonlet, is a species of skimmer in the dragonfly family Libellulidae. It is found in Central America, North America, and South America.

The IUCN conservation status of Erythrodiplax fusca is "LC", least concern, with no immediate threat to the species' survival. The population is stable. The IUCN status was reviewed in 2017.

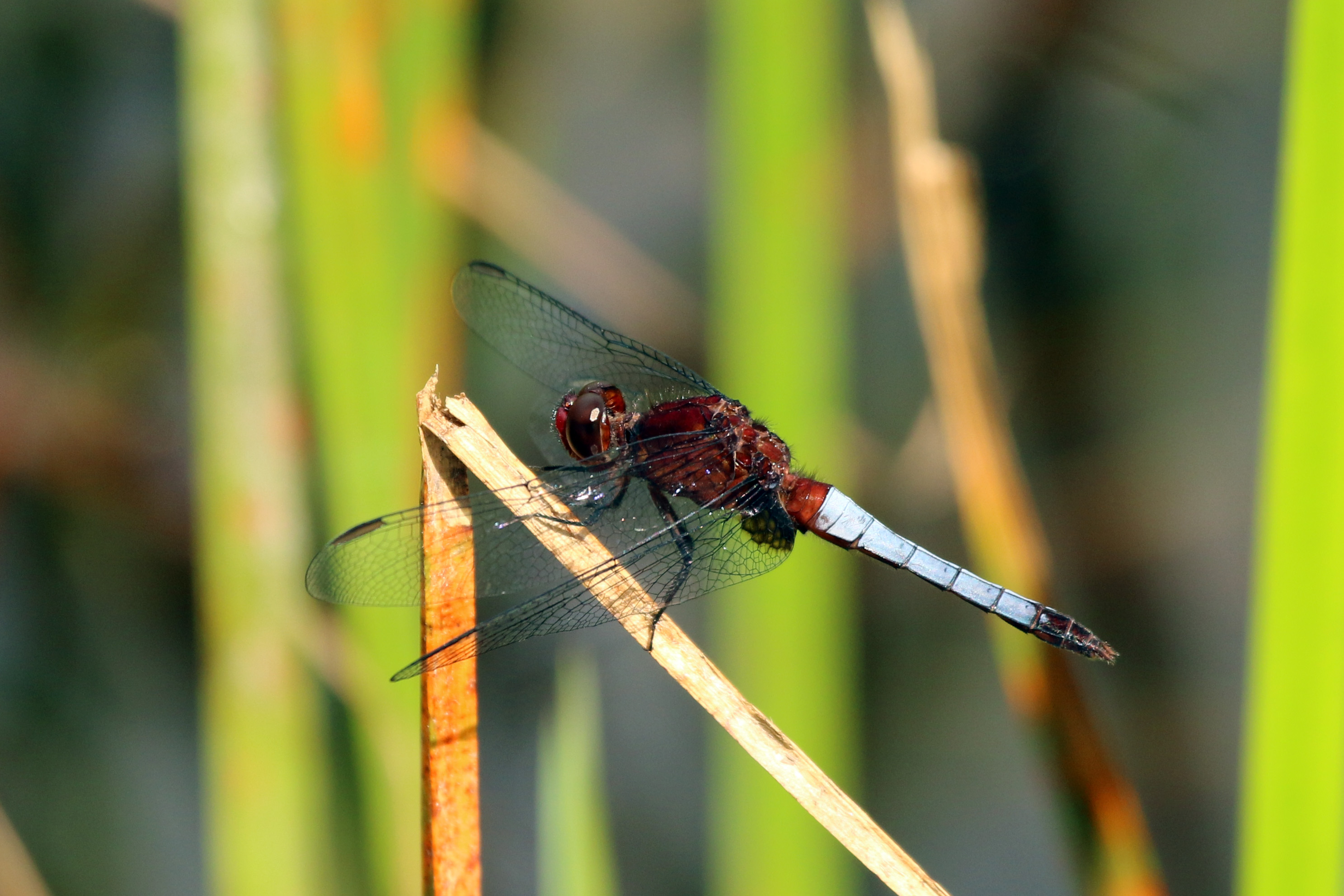
Red-faced dragonlet, Erythrodiplax fusca
