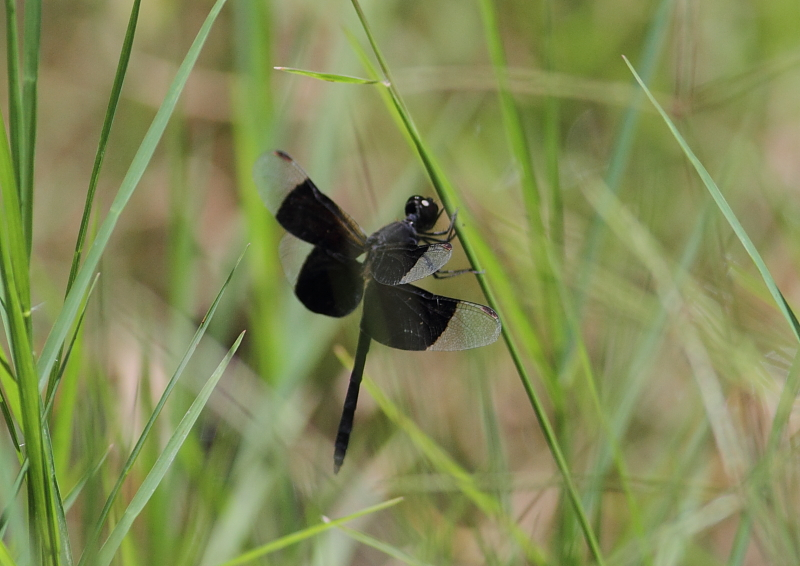
- male
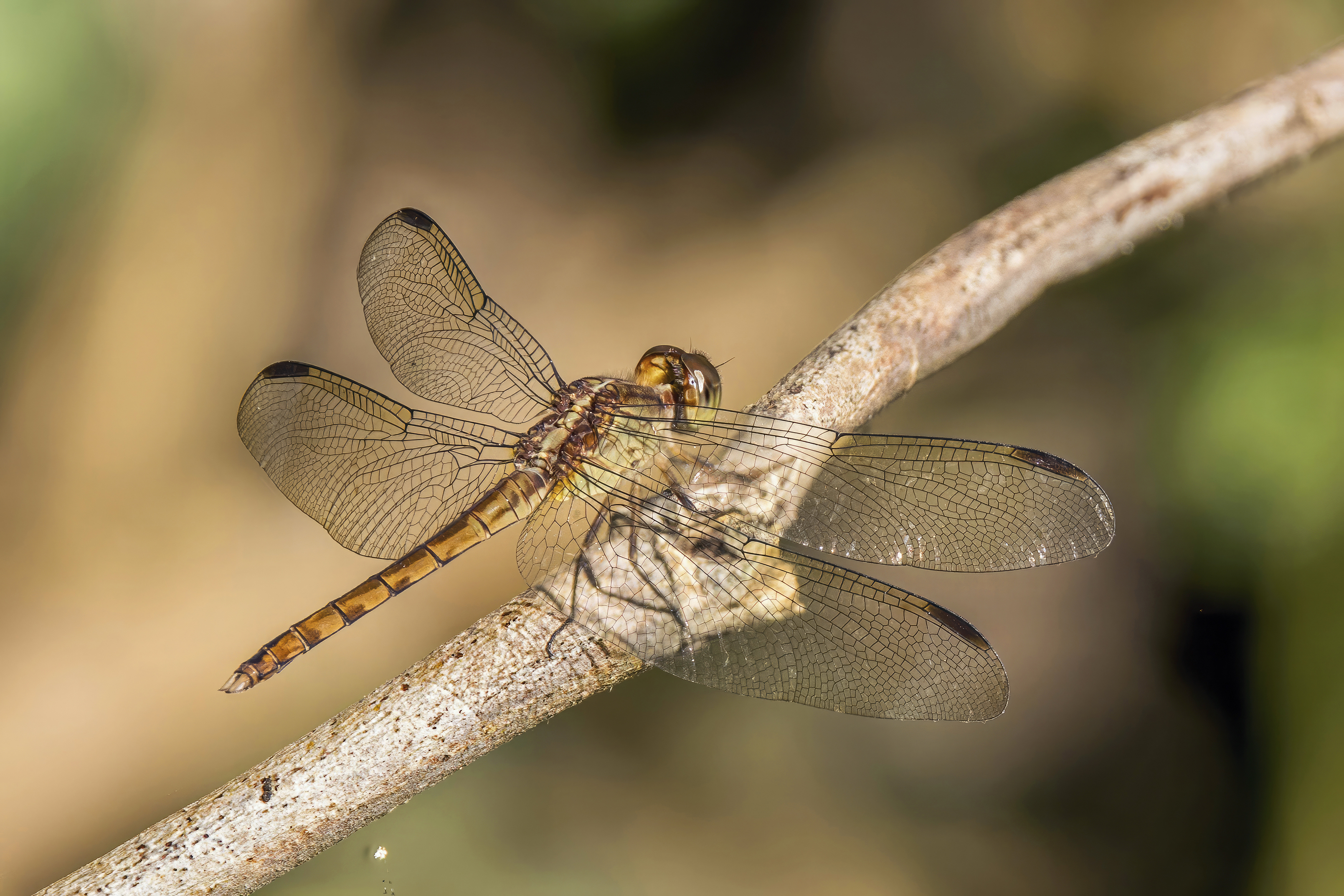
- female

Conservation status
- Least Concern (IUCN 3.1)

Scientific classification
- Kingdom: Animalia
- Phylum: Arthropoda
- Class: Insecta
- Order: Odonata
- Infraorder: Anisoptera
- Family: Libellulidae
- Genus: Erythrodiplax
- Species: E. funerea

Binomial name
- Erythrodiplax funerea (Hagen, 1861)

= Erythrodiplax funerea =

Species of dragonfly

Erythrodiplax funerea, the black-winged dragonlet, is a species of skimmer in the dragonfly family Libellulidae. It is found in parts of southern Asia (India), Central America, North America, and South America.

The IUCN conservation status of Erythrodiplax funerea is "LC", least concern, with no immediate threat to the species' survival. The IUCN status was assessed in 2016.
