= Erythrodiplax bromeliicola =

Conservation status
- Data Deficient (IUCN 3.1)

Scientific classification
- Kingdom: Animalia
- Phylum: Arthropoda
- Class: Insecta
- Order: Odonata
- Infraorder: Anisoptera
- Family: Libellulidae
- Genus: Erythrodiplax
- Species: E. bromeliicola

Binomial name
- Erythrodiplax bromeliicola Westfall in Needham, Westfall & May, 2000

Species of dragonfly

Erythrodiplax bromeliicola is a species of dragonfly in the family Libellulidae. It is found in Cuba and Jamaica. Its natural habitat is subtropical or tropical moist lowland forests. It is threatened by habitat loss.
