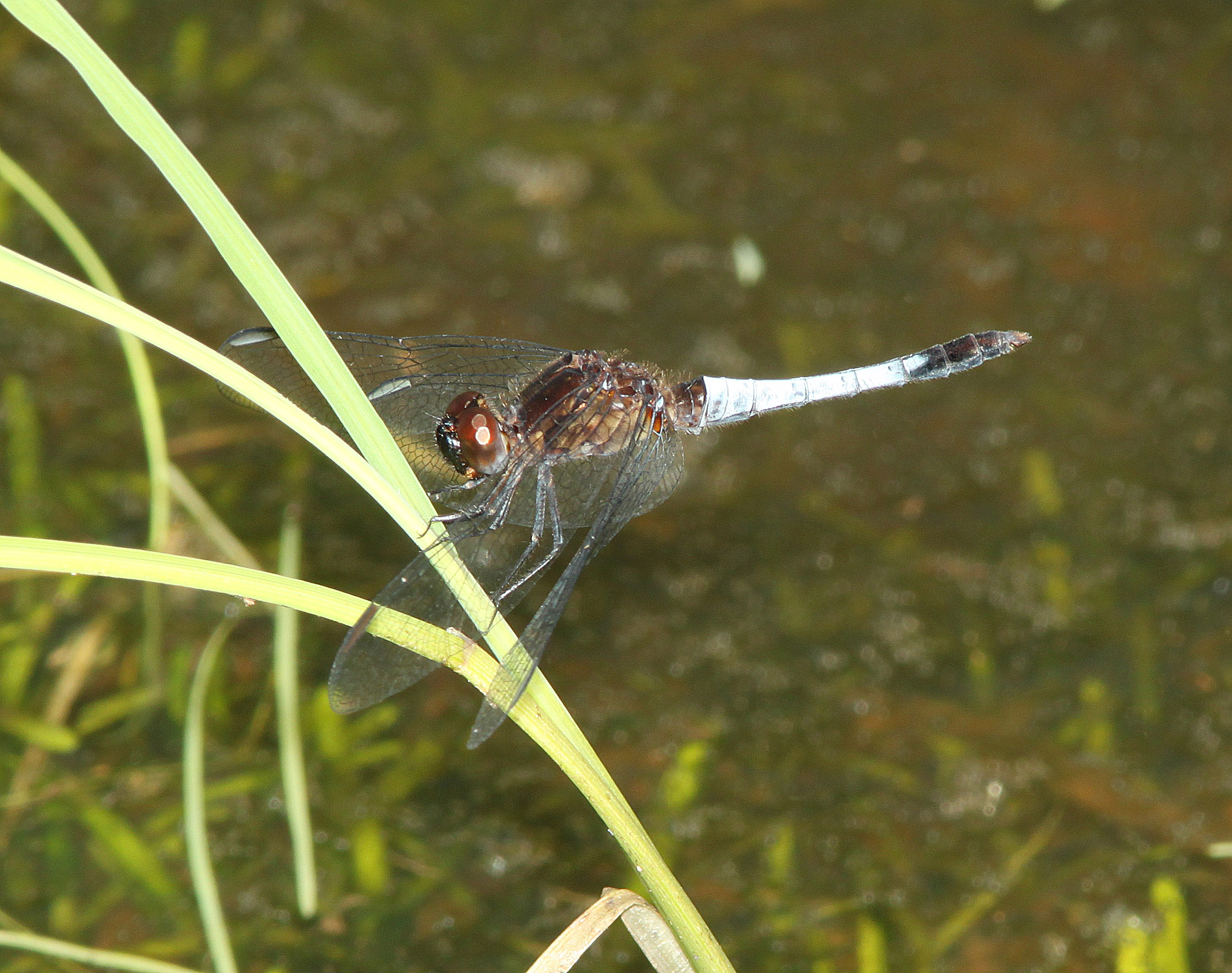

Conservation status
- Least Concern (IUCN 3.1)

Scientific classification
- Kingdom: Animalia
- Phylum: Arthropoda
- Class: Insecta
- Order: Odonata
- Infraorder: Anisoptera
- Family: Libellulidae
- Genus: Erythrodiplax
- Species: E. basifusca

Binomial name
- Erythrodiplax basifusca (Calvert, 1895)

= Erythrodiplax basifusca =

Species of dragonfly

Erythrodiplax basifusca, the plateau dragonlet, is a species of skimmer in the dragonfly family Libellulidae.

The IUCN conservation status of Erythrodiplax basifusca is "LC", least concern, with no immediate threat to the species' survival. The population is stable. The IUCN status was reviewed in 2017.
