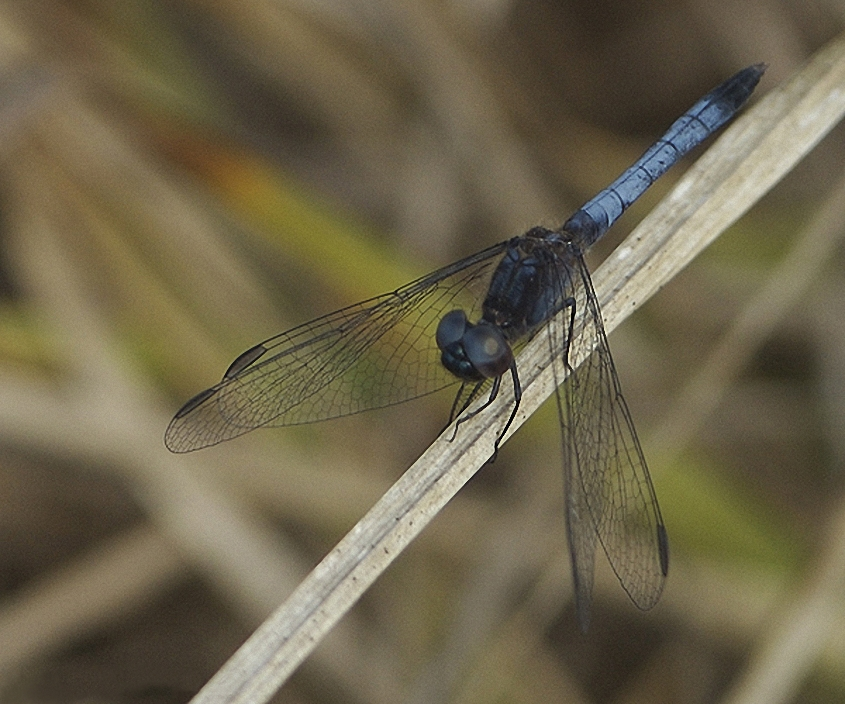

Conservation status
- Least Concern (IUCN 3.1)

Scientific classification
- Kingdom: Animalia
- Phylum: Arthropoda
- Class: Insecta
- Order: Odonata
- Infraorder: Anisoptera
- Family: Libellulidae
- Genus: Erythrodiplax
- Species: E. minuscula

Binomial name
- Erythrodiplax minuscula (Rambur, 1842)

= Erythrodiplax minuscula =

Species of dragonfly

Erythrodiplax minuscula, the little blue dragonlet, is a species of skimmer in the dragonfly family Libellulidae. It is found in North America.

The IUCN conservation status of Erythrodiplax minuscula is "LC", least concern, with no immediate threat to the species' survival. The population is stable. The IUCN status was reviewed in 2017.

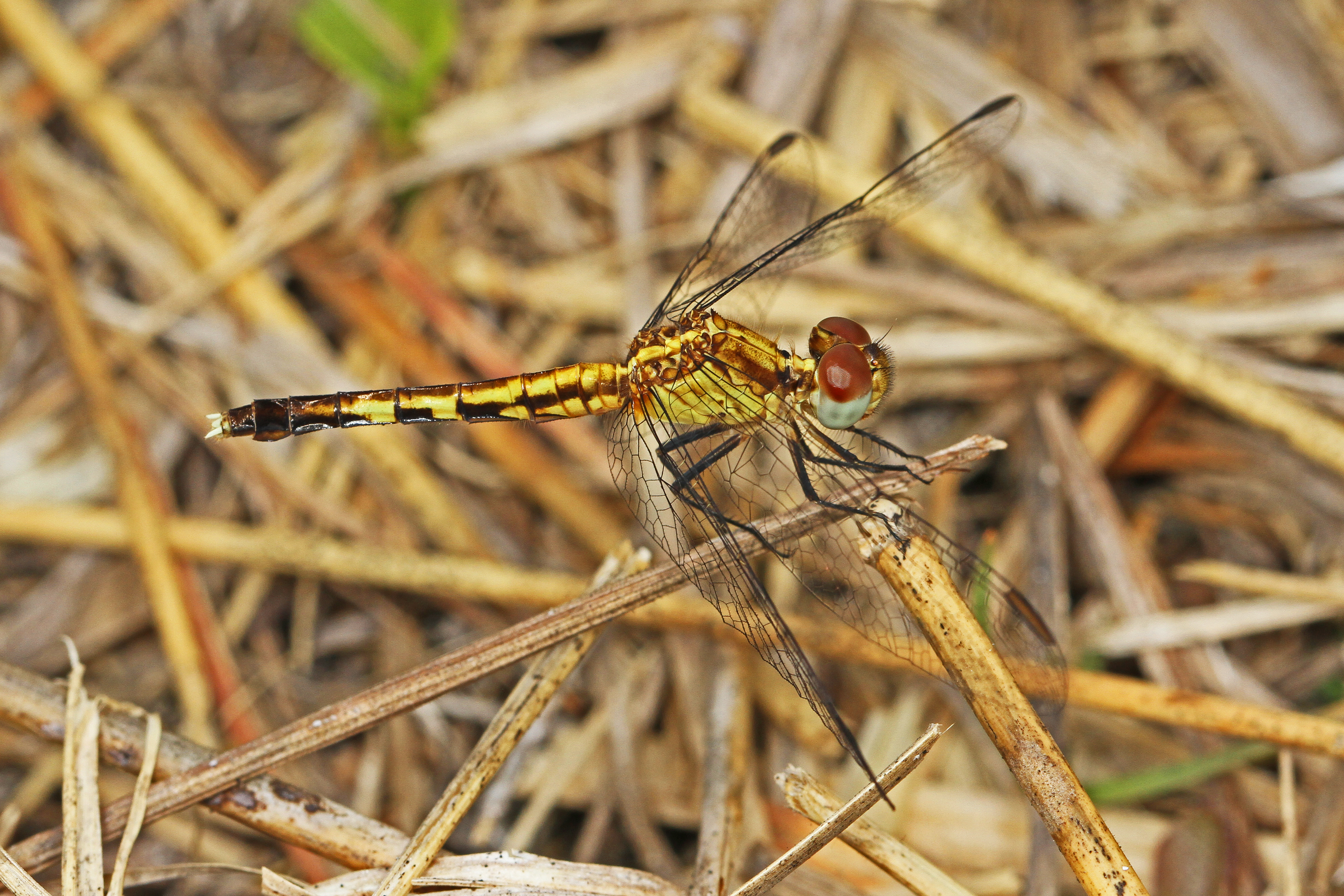
Little blue dragonlet, Erythrodiplax minuscula

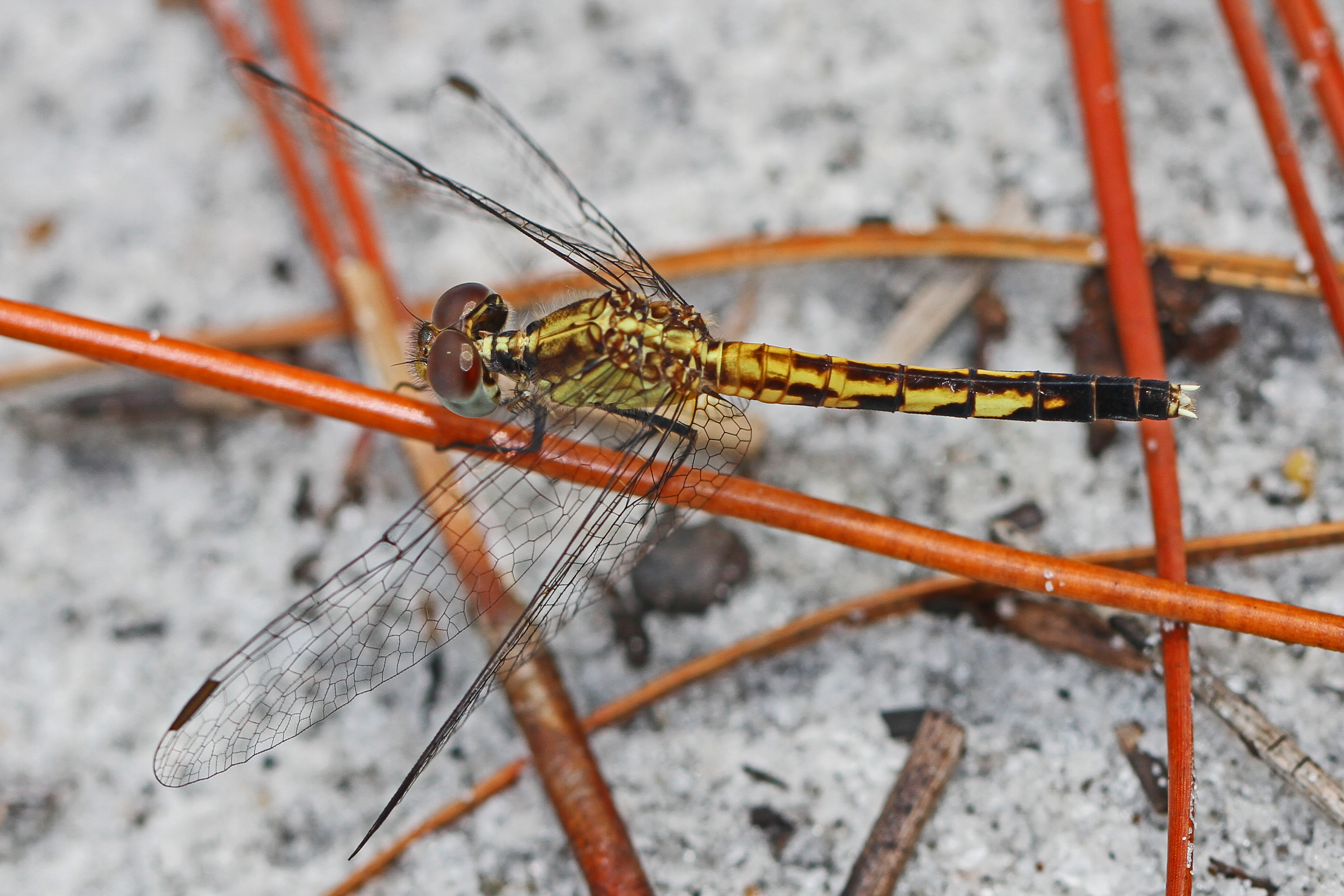
Little blue dragonlet, Erythrodiplax minuscula
