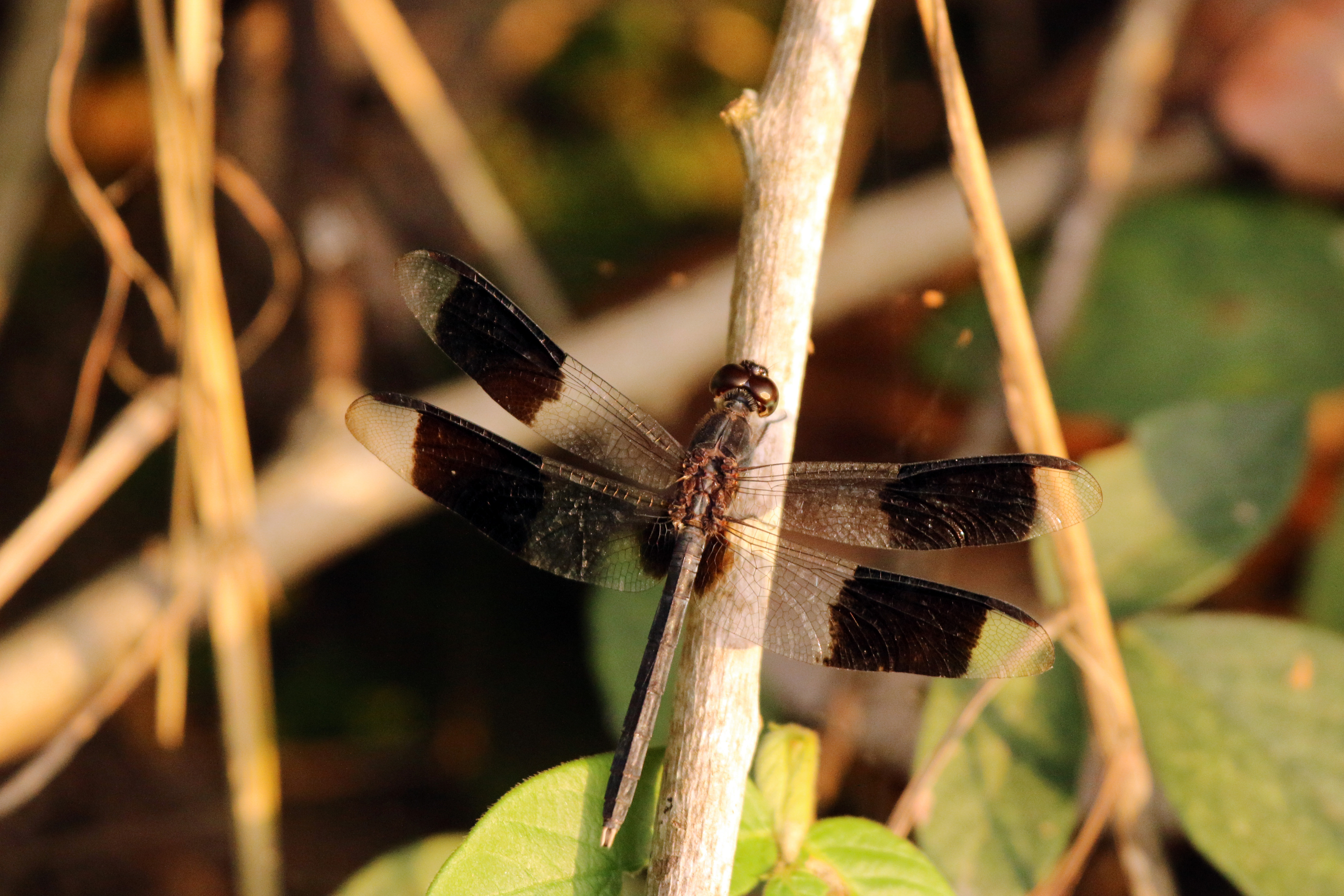
- E. umbrata, Band-winged dragonlet, Jamaica

Scientific classification
- Kingdom: Animalia
- Phylum: Arthropoda
- Clade: Pancrustacea
- Class: Insecta
- Order: Odonata
- Suborder: Anisoptera
- Superfamily: Libelluloidea
- Family: Libellulidae
- Subfamily: Sympetrinae
- Genus: Erythrodiplax; Brauer, 1868

Type species
- Erythrodiplax diversa

= Erythrodiplax =

Dragonlets

Genus of dragonflies

Erythrodiplax is a large Neotropical genus of dragonflies in the family Libellulidae. These small to medium-sized skimmers are commonly known as dragonlets.

== Species ==
The genus contains the following species:

- Erythrodiplax abjecta (Rambur, 1842)
- Erythrodiplax acantha Borror, 1942
- Erythrodiplax amazonica Sjöstedt, 1918
- Erythrodiplax ana (Guillermo-Ferreira & Vilela, 2016)
- Erythrodiplax anatoidea Borror, 1942
- Erythrodiplax andagoya Borror, 1942
- Erythrodiplax angustipennis Borror, 1942
- Erythrodiplax anomala (Brauer, 1865)
- Erythrodiplax atroterminata Ris, 1911
- Erythrodiplax attenuata (Kirby, 1889)
- Erythrodiplax avittata Borror, 1942
- Erythrodiplax basalis (Kirby, 1897)
- Erythrodiplax basifusca (Calvert, 1895) - Plateau Dragonlet
- Erythrodiplax berenice (Drury, 1773) - Seaside Dragonlet
- Erythrodiplax branconensis Sjöstedt, 1929
- Erythrodiplax bromeliicola Westfall in Needham, Westfall & May, 2000 - Bromeliad Dragonlet
- Erythrodiplax castanea (Burmeister, 1839)
- Erythrodiplax cauca Borror, 1942
- Erythrodiplax chromoptera Borror, 1942
- Erythrodiplax cleopatra Ris, 1911
- Erythrodiplax clitella Borror, 1942
- Erythrodiplax connata (Burmeister, 1839)
- Erythrodiplax corallina (Brauer, 1865)
- Erythrodiplax diversa (Navás, 1916)
- Erythrodiplax famula (Erichson, 1848)
- Erythrodiplax fervida (Erichson, 1848)
- Erythrodiplax fulva Borror, 1957
- Erythrodiplax funerea (Hagen, 1861) - Black-winged Dragonlet
- Erythrodiplax fusca (Rambur, 1842) - Red-faced Dragonlet
- Erythrodiplax gomesi Santos, 1946
- Erythrodiplax hyalina Förster, 1907
- Erythrodiplax ines Ris, 1911
- Erythrodiplax juliana Ris, 1911
- Erythrodiplax justiniana (Selys in Sagra, 1857)
- Erythrodiplax kimminsi Borror, 1942
- Erythrodiplax latimaculata Ris, 1911
- Erythrodiplax lativittata Borror, 1942
- Erythrodiplax laurentia Borror, 1942
- Erythrodiplax leticia Machado, 1996
- Erythrodiplax longitudinalis (Ris, 1919)
- Erythrodiplax luteofrons Santos, 1956
- Erythrodiplax lygaea Ris, 1911
- Erythrodiplax maculosa (Hagen, 1861)
- Erythrodiplax media Borror, 1942
- Erythrodiplax melanica Borror, 1942
- Erythrodiplax melanorubra Borror, 1942
- Erythrodiplax minuscula (Rambur, 1842) - Little Blue Dragonlet
- Erythrodiplax nigricans (Rambur, 1842)
- Erythrodiplax nivea Borror, 1942
- Erythrodiplax ochracea (Burmeister, 1839)
- Erythrodiplax pallida (Needham, 1904)
- Erythrodiplax paraguayensis (Förster, 1904)
- Erythrodiplax parvimaculata Borror, 1942
- Erythrodiplax solimaea Ris, 1911
- Erythrodiplax tenuis Borror, 1942
- Erythrodiplax transversa Borror, 1957
- Erythrodiplax umbrata (Linnaeus, 1758) - Band-winged Dragonlet
- Erythrodiplax unimaculata (de Geer, 1773)
- Erythrodiplax venusta (Kirby, 1897)

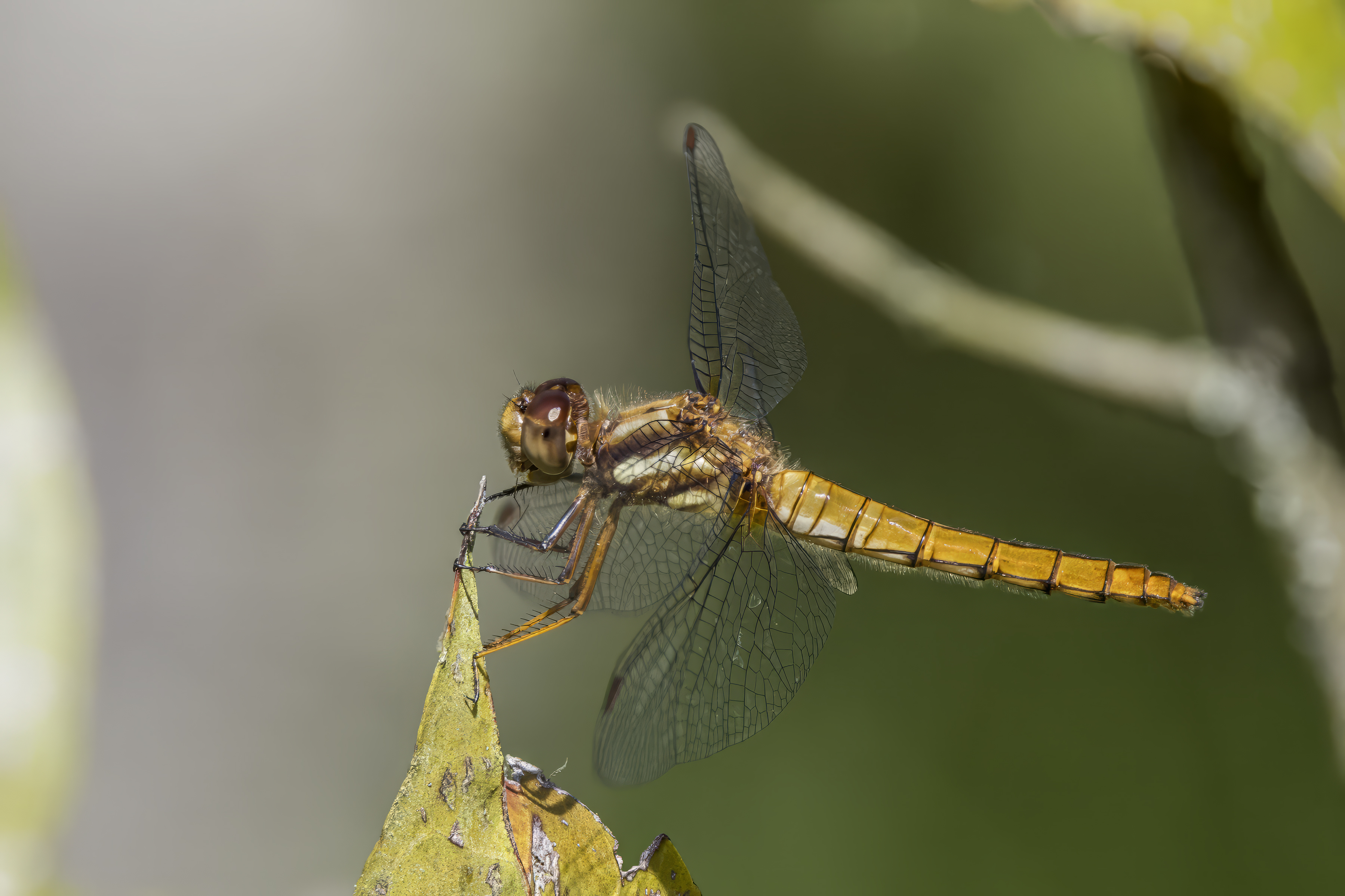
E. abjecta, female, Colombia

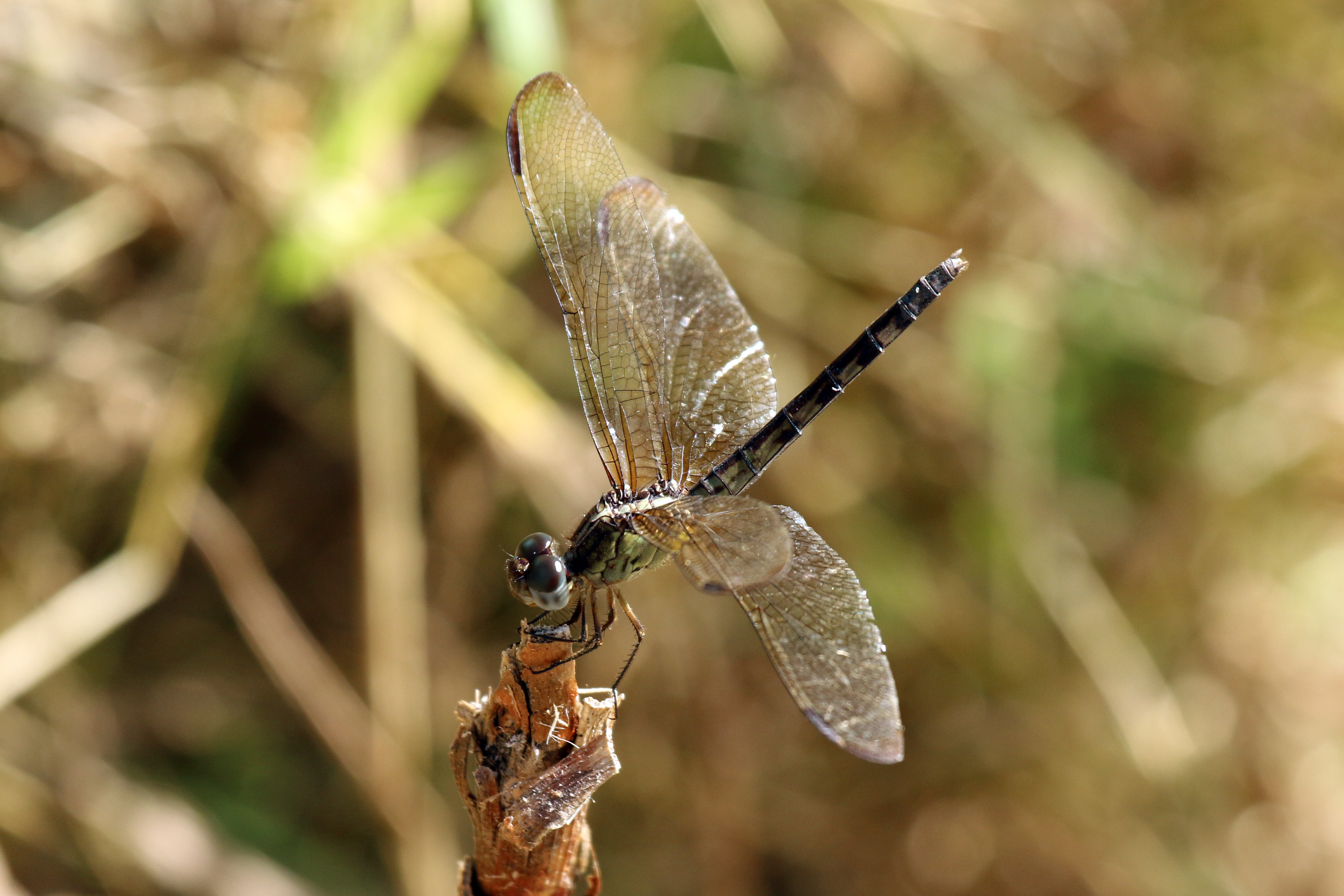
E. basalis, female dragonlet, Jamaica

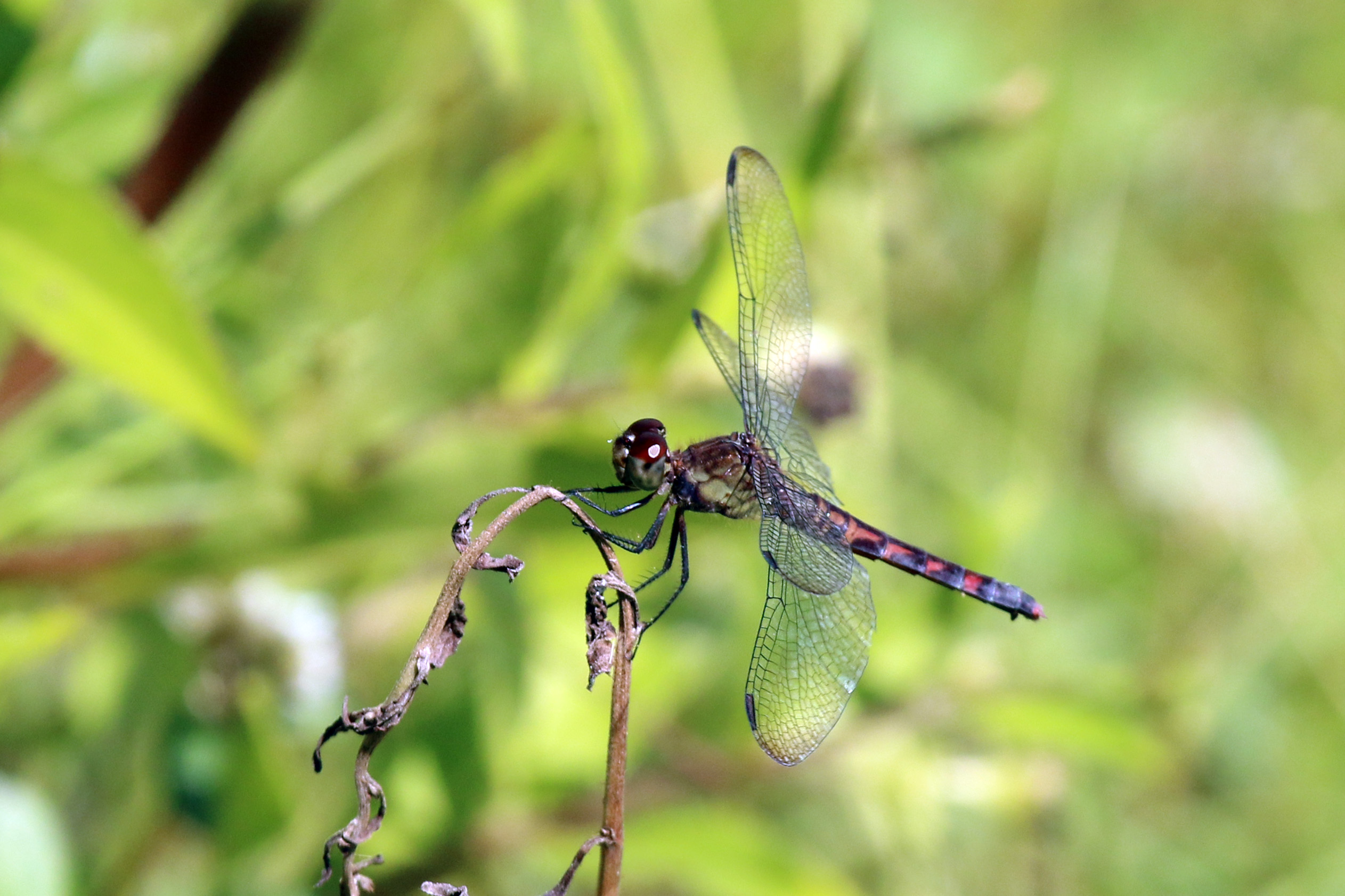
E. famula, female reddish dragonlet, Tobago

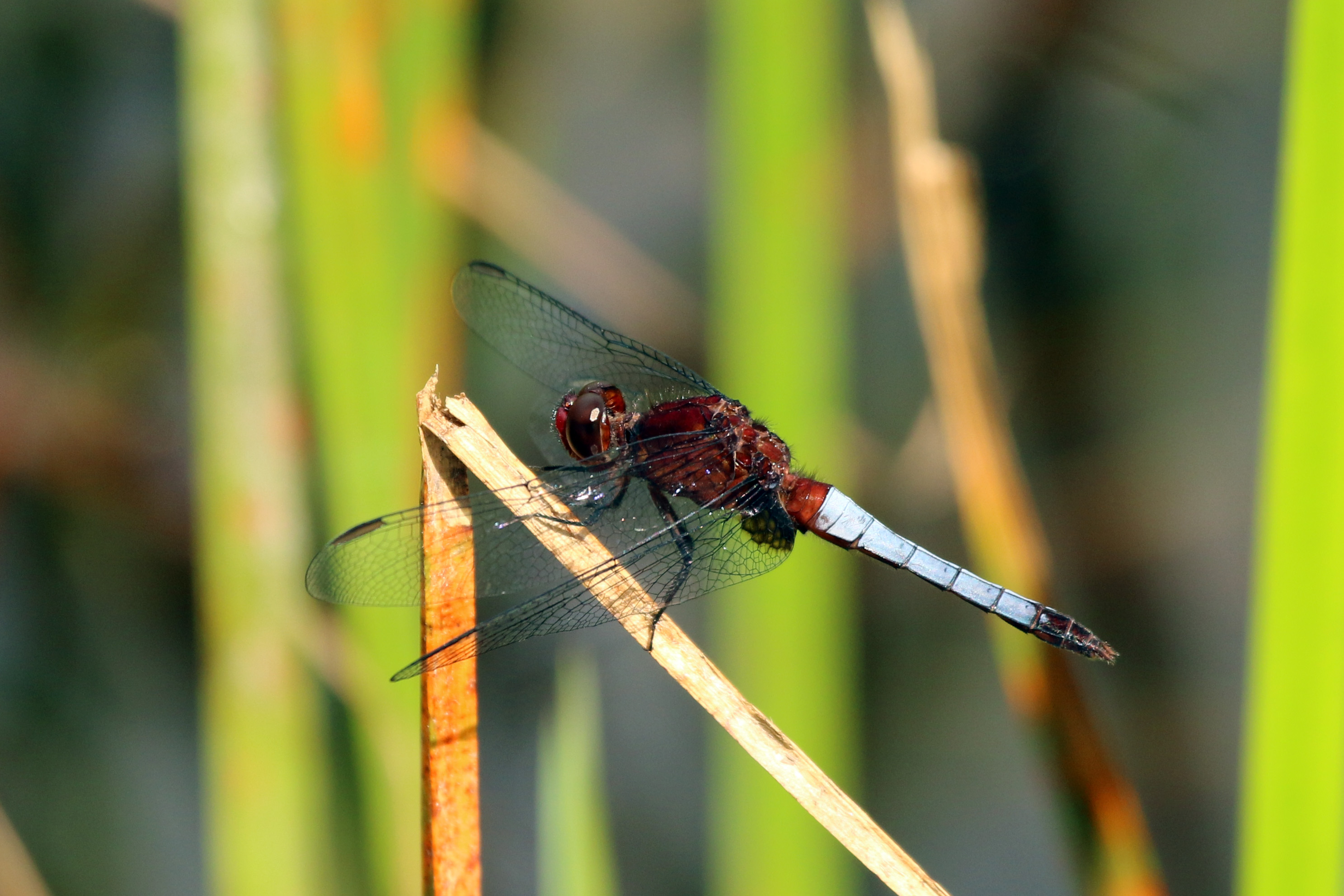
E. fusca, male red-faced dragonlet, Tobago

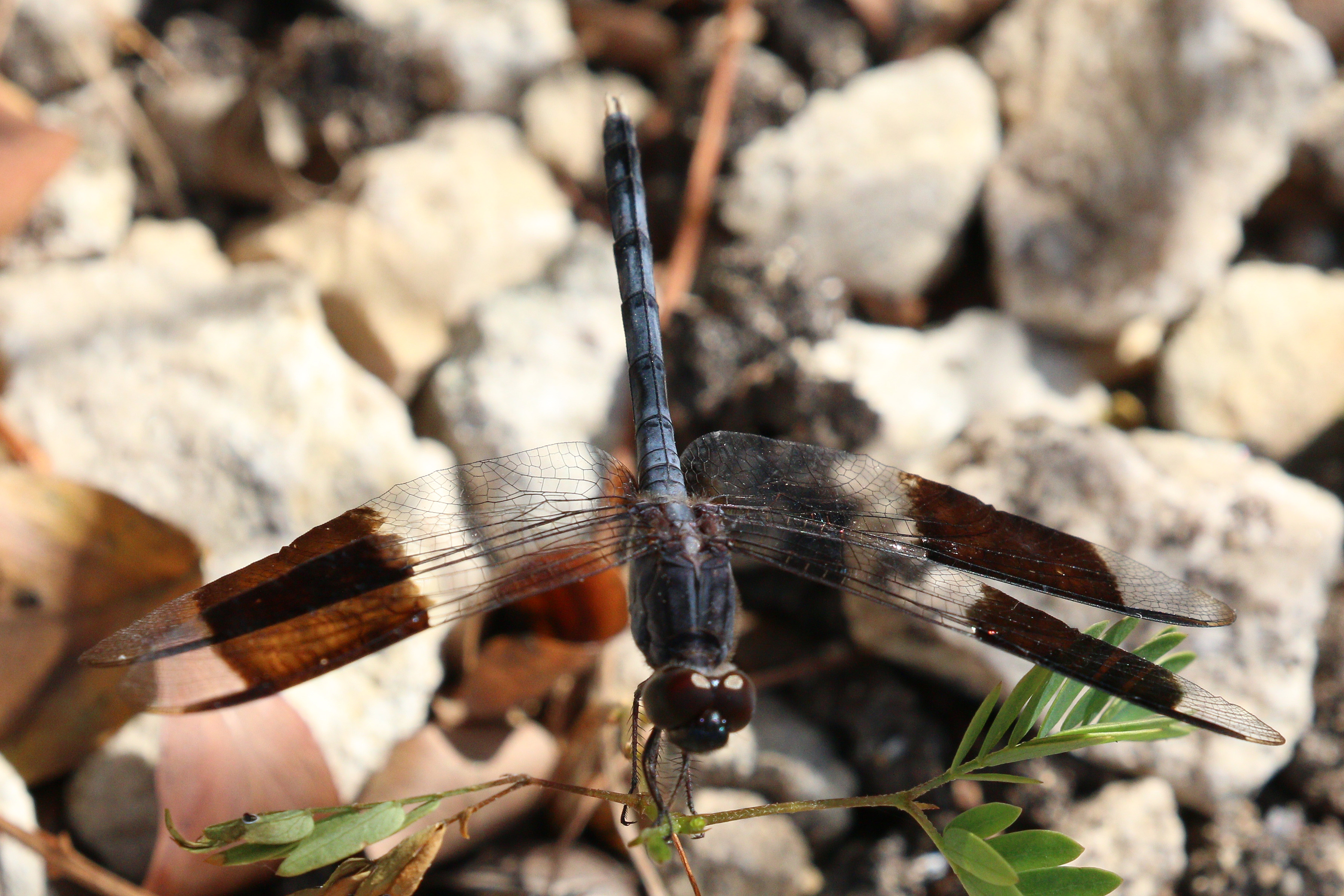
E. umbrata, male band-winged dragonlet, Cuba

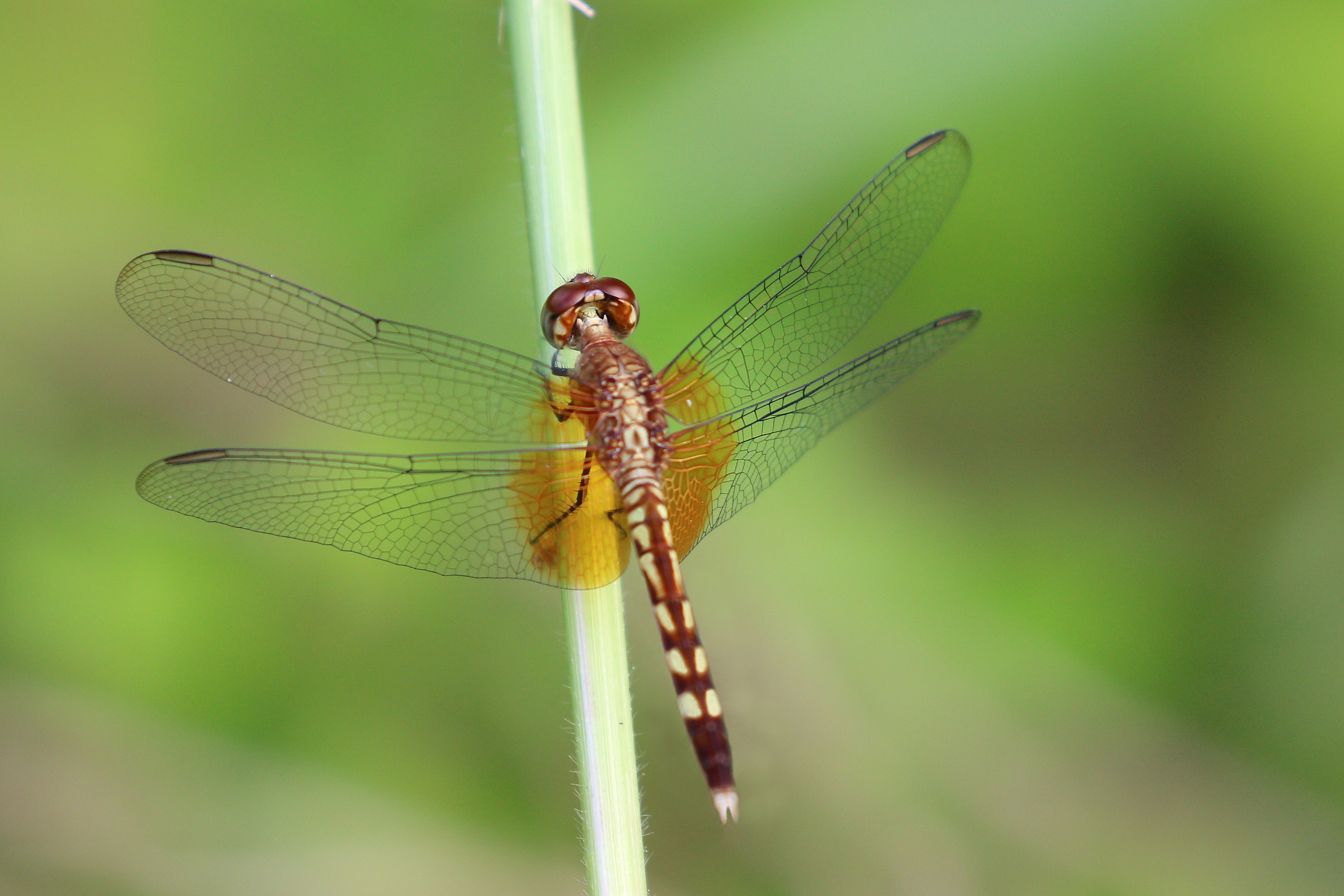
E. fervida, female red-mantled dragonlet, Grand Cayman

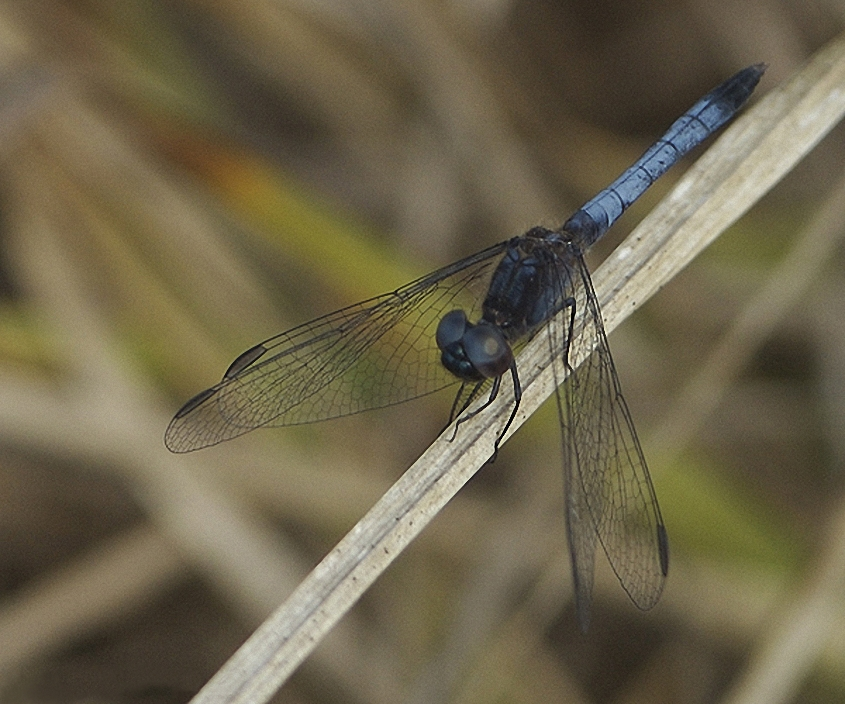
E. minuscula, male little blue dragonlet, Florida, United States

E. nigricans female, Argentina

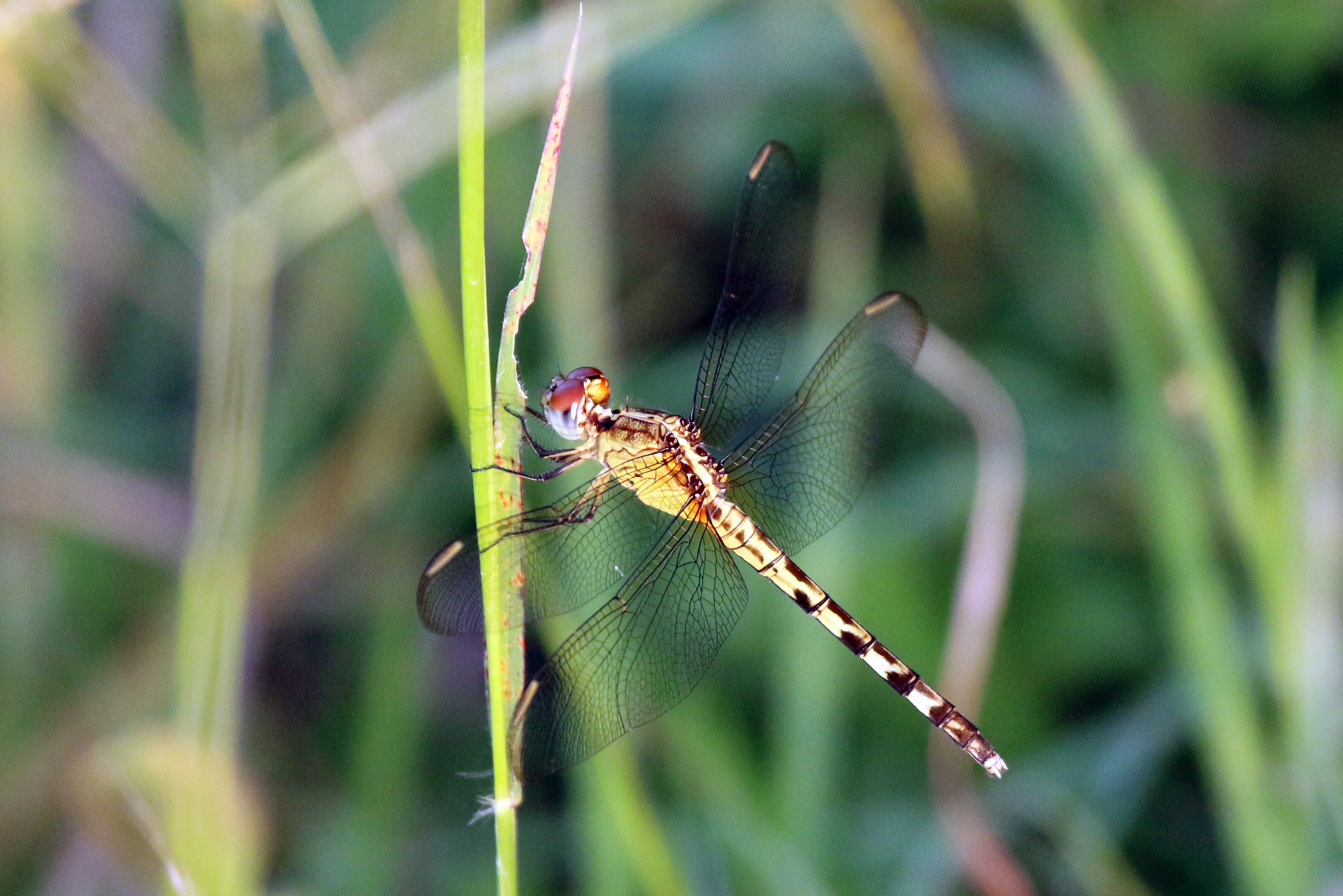
E. umbrata, immature male band-winged dragonlet, Jamaica

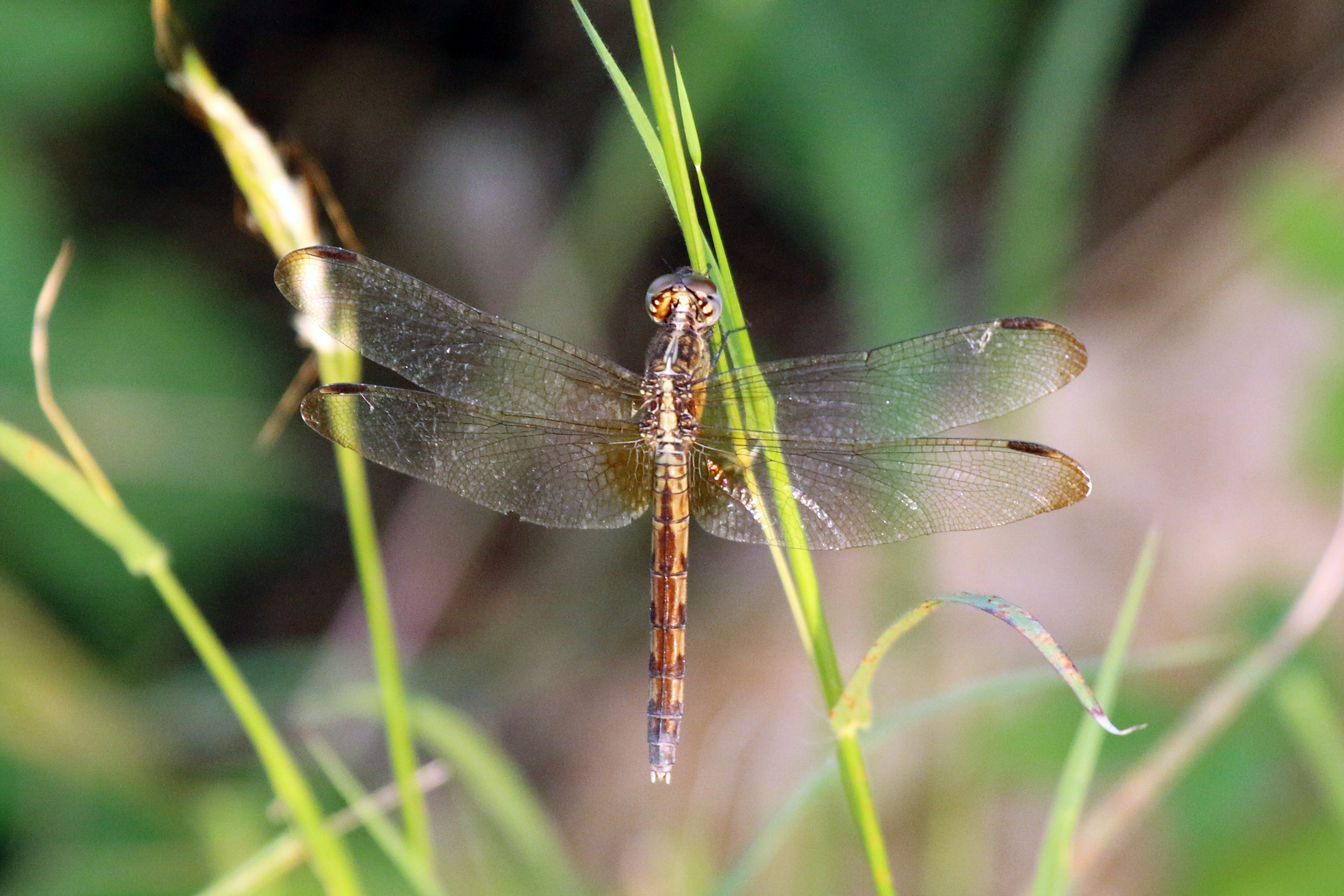
E. umbrata, female band-winged dragonlet, Jamaica

male E. cleopatra, Brazil
