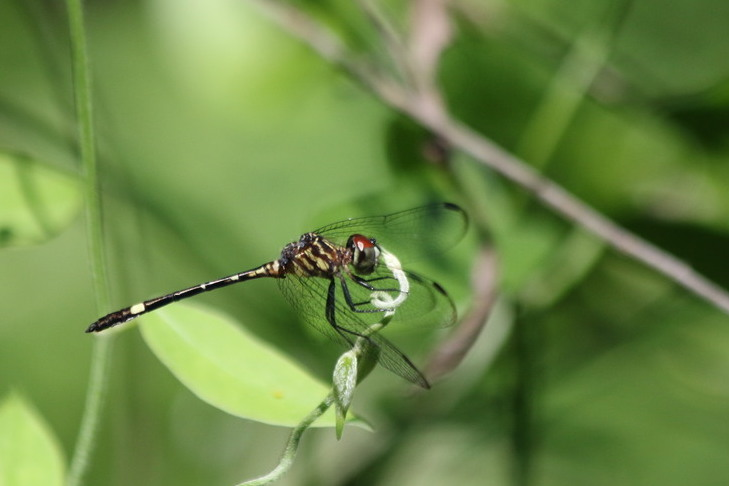

Conservation status
- Least Concern (IUCN 3.1)

Scientific classification
- Kingdom: Animalia
- Phylum: Arthropoda
- Class: Insecta
- Order: Odonata
- Infraorder: Anisoptera
- Family: Libellulidae
- Genus: Micrathyria
- Species: M. didyma

Binomial name
- Micrathyria didyma (Selys in Sagra, 1857)

= Micrathyria didyma =

Species of dragonfly

Micrathyria didyma, the three-striped dasher, is a species of skimmer in the dragonfly family Libellulidae. It is found in the Caribbean Sea, Central America, North America, and South America.

The IUCN conservation status of Micrathyria didyma is "LC", least concern, with no immediate threat to the species' survival. The population is stable. The IUCN status was reviewed in 2017.
