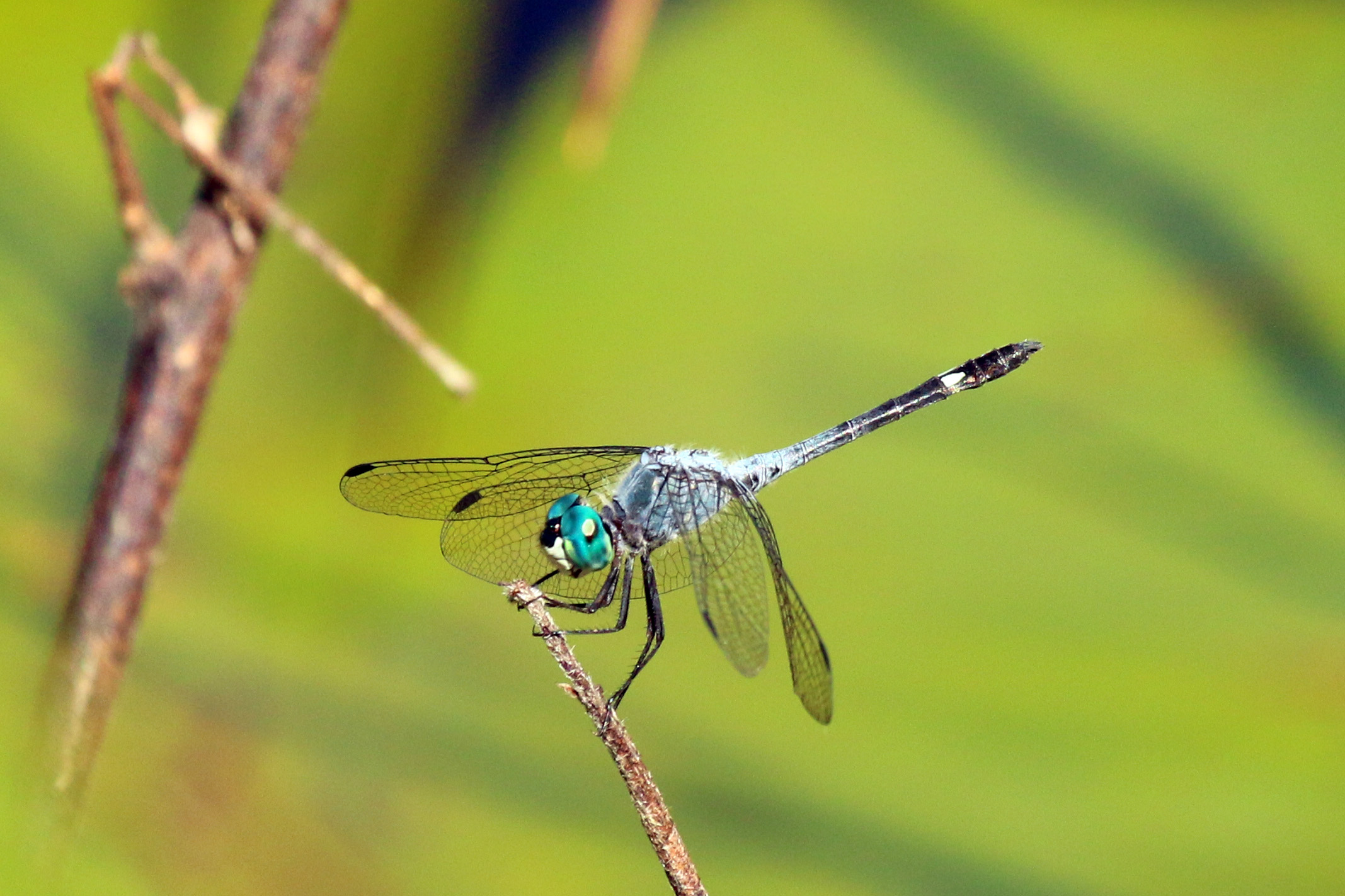

Conservation status
- Least Concern (IUCN 3.1)

Scientific classification
- Kingdom: Animalia
- Phylum: Arthropoda
- Class: Insecta
- Order: Odonata
- Infraorder: Anisoptera
- Family: Libellulidae
- Genus: Micrathyria
- Species: M. aequalis

Binomial name
- Micrathyria aequalis (Hagen, 1861)

= Micrathyria aequalis =

Species of dragonfly

Micrathyria aequalis, the spot-tailed dasher, is a species of skimmer in the dragonfly family Libellulidae. It is found in the Caribbean Sea, Central America, North America, and South America.

The IUCN conservation status of Micrathyria aequalis is "LC", least concern, with no immediate threat to the species' survival. The population is stable. The IUCN status was reviewed in 2017.

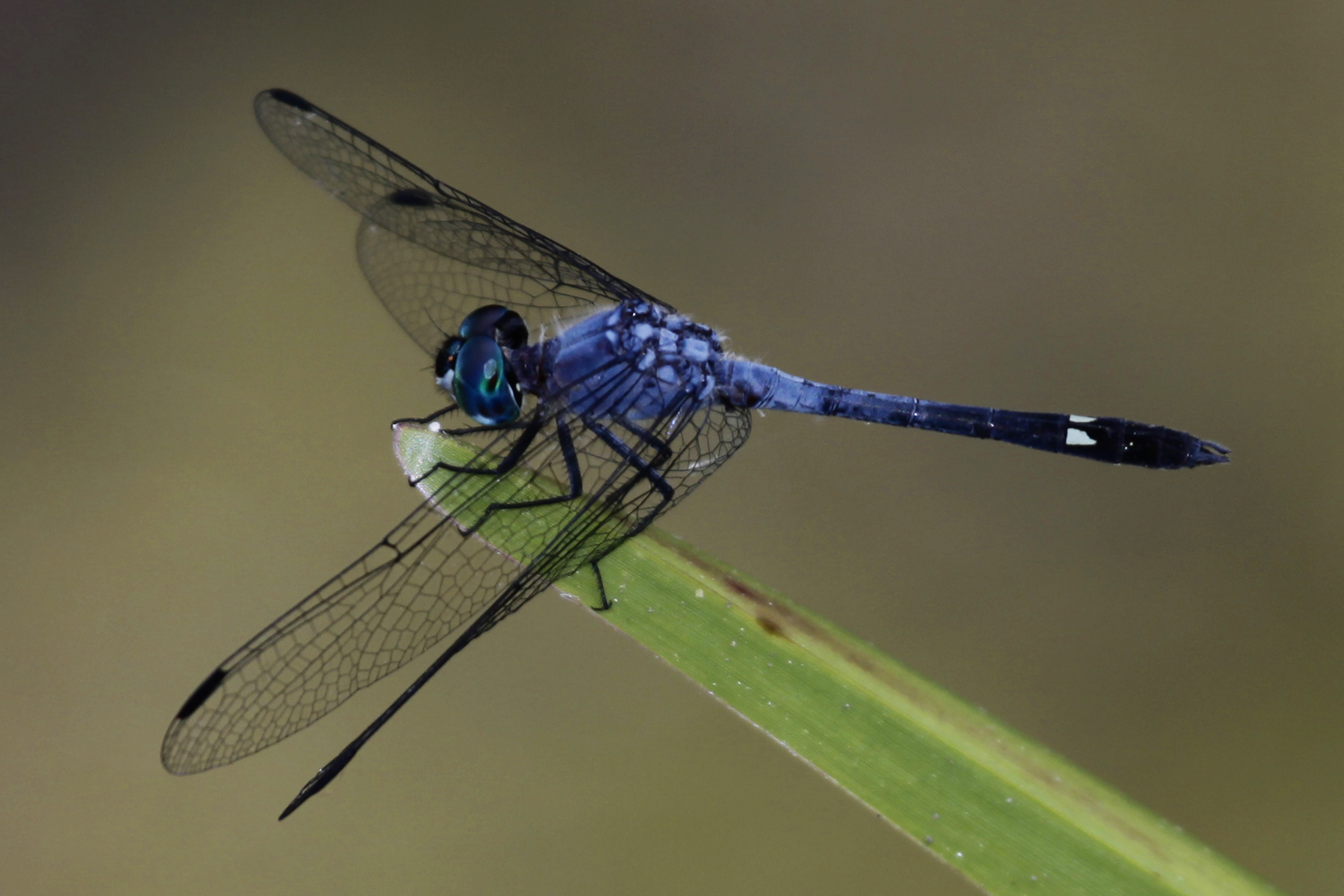
Spot-tailed dasher, Micrathyria aequalis
