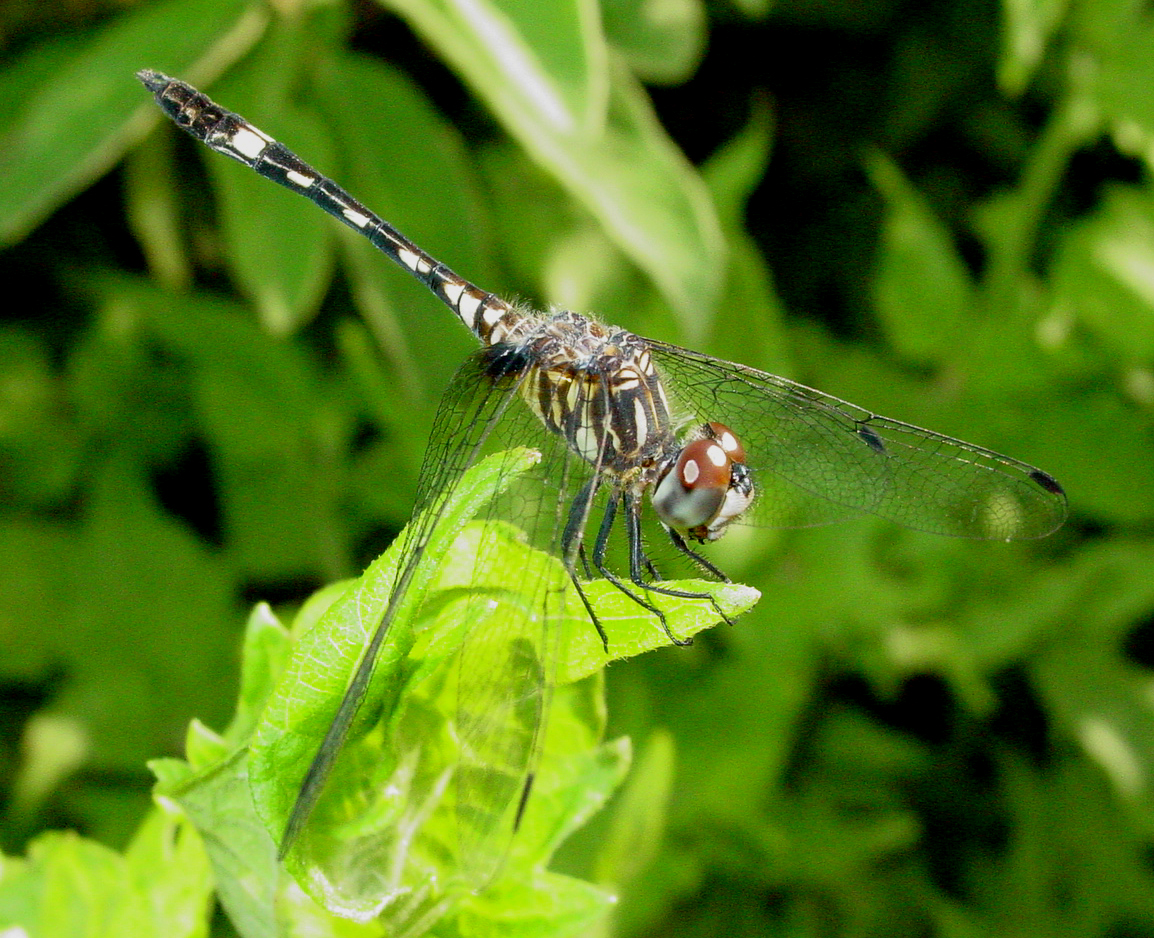

Conservation status
- Least Concern (IUCN 3.1)

Scientific classification
- Kingdom: Animalia
- Phylum: Arthropoda
- Class: Insecta
- Order: Odonata
- Infraorder: Anisoptera
- Family: Libellulidae
- Genus: Micrathyria
- Species: M. hagenii

Binomial name
- Micrathyria hagenii Kirby, 1890

= Micrathyria hagenii =

Species of dragonfly

Micrathyria hagenii, the thornbush dasher, is a species of skimmer in the dragonfly family Libellulidae. It is found in the Caribbean Sea, Central America, and North America.

The IUCN conservation status of Micrathyria hagenii is "LC", least concern, with no immediate threat to the species' survival. The population is stable. The IUCN status was reviewed in 2017.

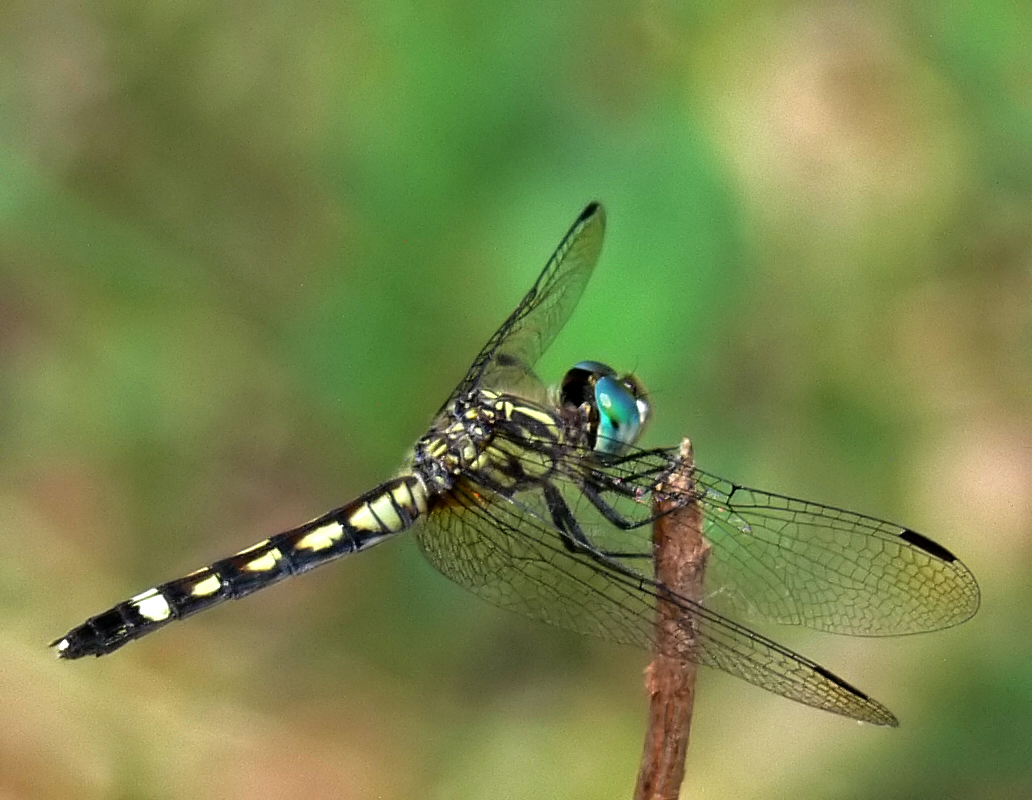
Thornbush dasher, Micrathyria hagenii
