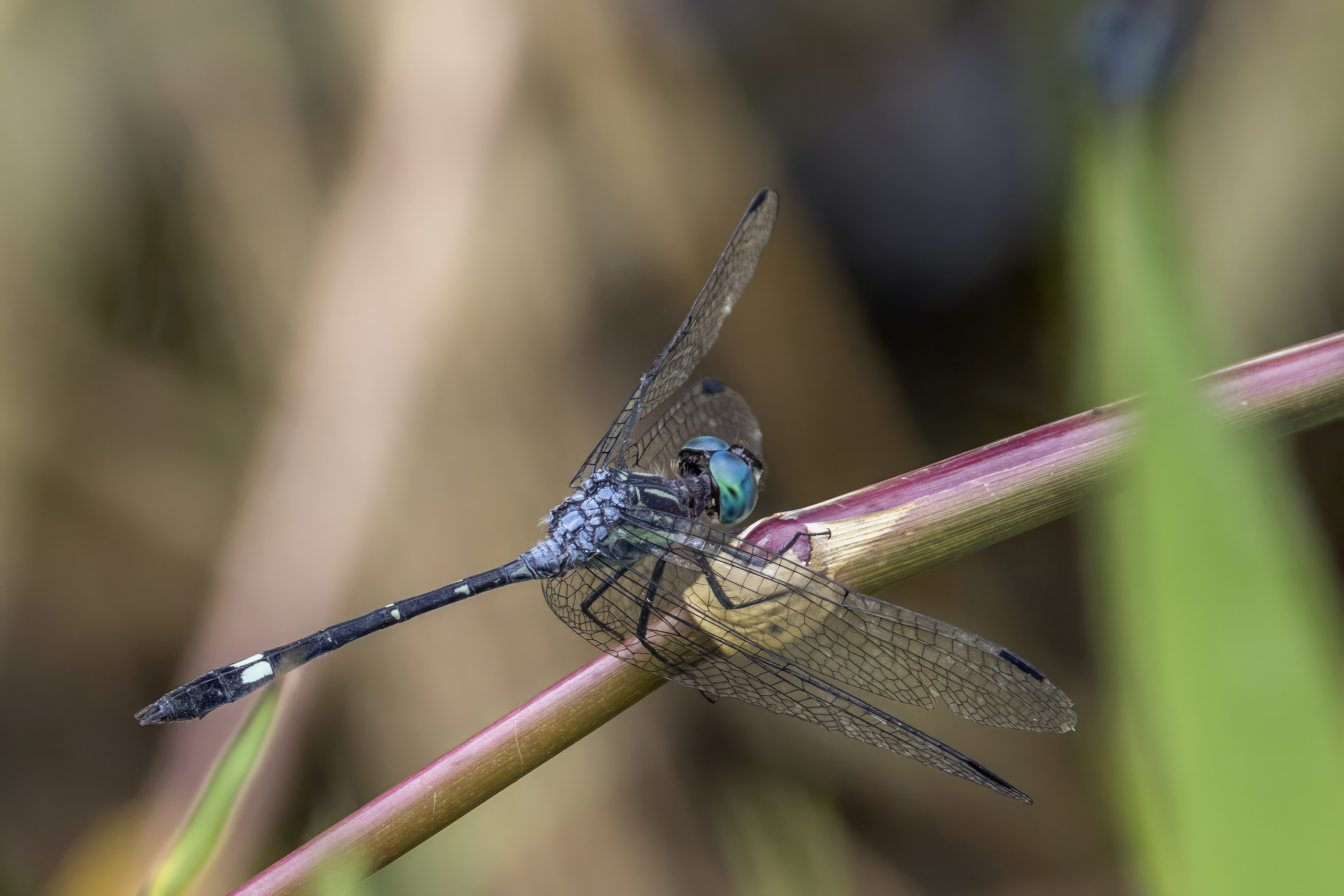
- male M. hypodidyma, Colombia

Scientific classification
- Kingdom: Animalia
- Phylum: Arthropoda
- Class: Insecta
- Order: Odonata
- Infraorder: Anisoptera
- Family: Libellulidae
- Subfamily: Brachydiplacinae
- Genus: Micrathyria; Kirby, 1889

Type species
- Micrathyria didyma

= Micrathyria =

Genus of dragonflies

Micrathyria is a Neotropical genus of dragonflies. They have bright green eyes and white faces. Most species have a markedly striped thorax. They are commonly known as Tropical Dashers.

As of 2002, there were about 48 species.

Species include:

- Micrathyria aequalis (Hagen, 1861) - Spot-tailed Dasher
- Micrathyria almeidai Santos, 1945
- Micrathyria artemis Ris, 1911 - Artemis Dasher
- Micrathyria athenais Calvert, 1909
- Micrathyria atra (Martin, 1897) - Black Dasher
- Micrathyria borgmeieri Santos, 1947
- Micrathyria caerulistyla Donnelly, 1992 - Blue-tipped Dasher
- Micrathyria cambridgei Kirby, 1897
- Micrathyria catenata Calvert, 1909
- Micrathyria coropinae Geijskes, 1963
- Micrathyria debilis (Hagen, 1861)
- Micrathyria dictynna Ris, 1919
- Micrathyria dido Ris, 1911
- Micrathyria didyma (Selys in Sagra, 1857) - Three-striped Dasher
- Micrathyria dissocians Calvert, 1906 - Caribbean Dasher
- Micrathyria divergens Westfall, 1992
- Micrathyria dunklei Westfall, 1992
- Micrathyria duplicata Navás, 1922
- Micrathyria dythemoides Calvert, 1909
- Micrathyria eximia Kirby, 1897
- Micrathyria hagenii Kirby, 1890 - Thornbush Dasher
- Micrathyria hesperis Ris, 1911
- Micrathyria hippolyte Ris, 1911 - Forest Dasher
- Micrathyria hypodidyma Calvert, 1906
- Micrathyria iheringi Santos, 1946
- Micrathyria kleerekoperi Calvert, 1946
- Micrathyria laevigata Calvert, 1909
- Micrathyria longifasciata Calvert, 1909
- Micrathyria mengeri Ris, 1919
- Micrathyria occipita Westfall, 1992
- Micrathyria ocellata Martin, 1897
- Micrathyria paruensis Geijskes, 1963
- Micrathyria pirassunungae Santos, 1953
- Micrathyria pseudeximia Westfall, 1992
- Micrathyria pseudhypodidyma Costa, Lourenço & Viera, 2002
- Micrathyria ringueleti Rodrigues, 1988
- Micrathyria romani Sjöstedt, 1918
- Micrathyria schumanni Calvert, 1906
- Micrathyria spinifera Calvert, 1909
- Micrathyria spuria (Selys, 1900)
- Micrathyria stawiarskii Santos, 1953
- Micrathyria surinamensis Geijskes, 1963
- Micrathyria sympriona Tennessen, 2000
- Micrathyria tibialis Kirby, 1897 - Pale-footed Dasher
- Micrathyria ungulata Förster, 1907
- Micrathyria venezuelae De Marmels, 1989
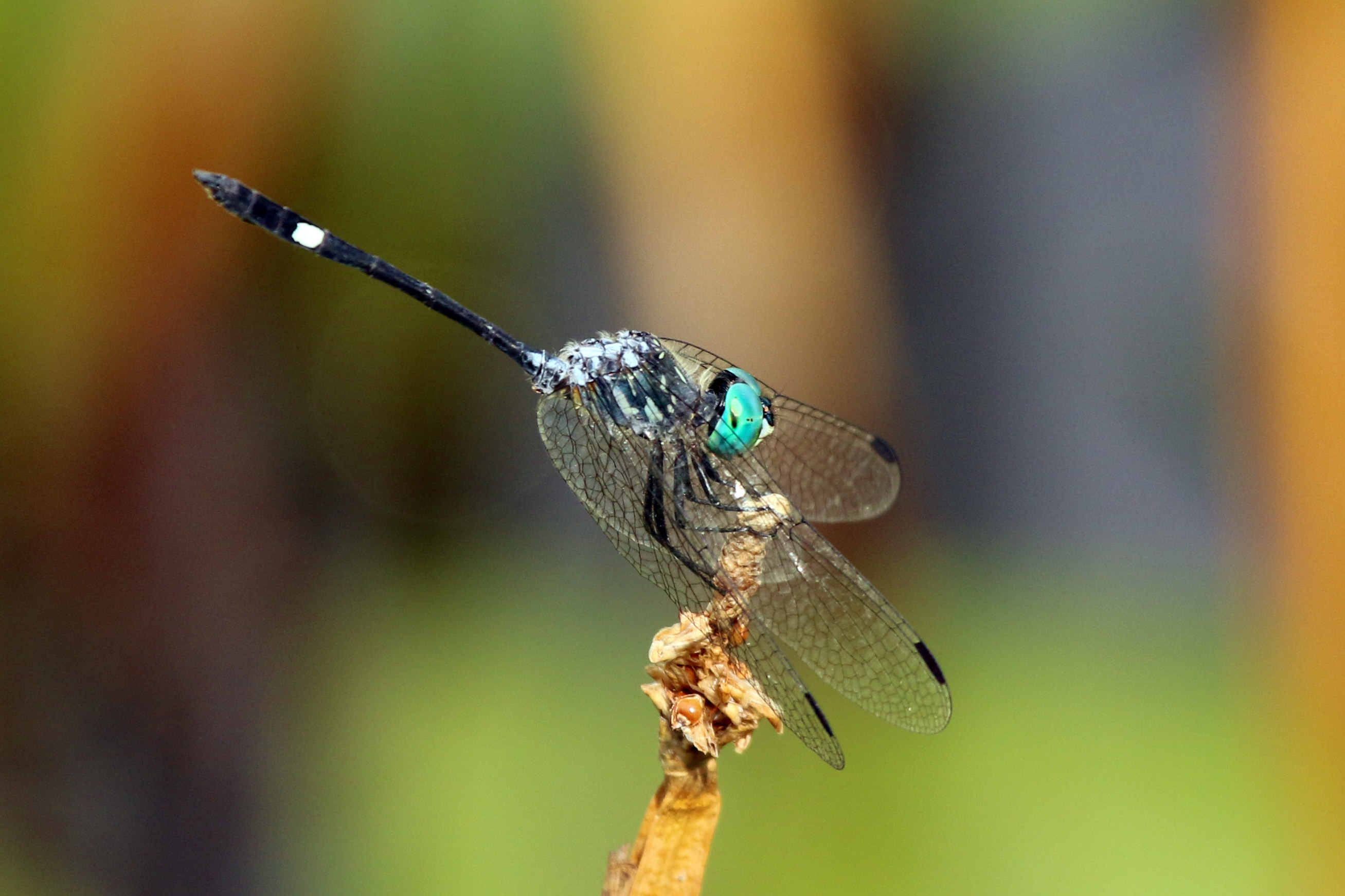
M. dissocians, Tobago

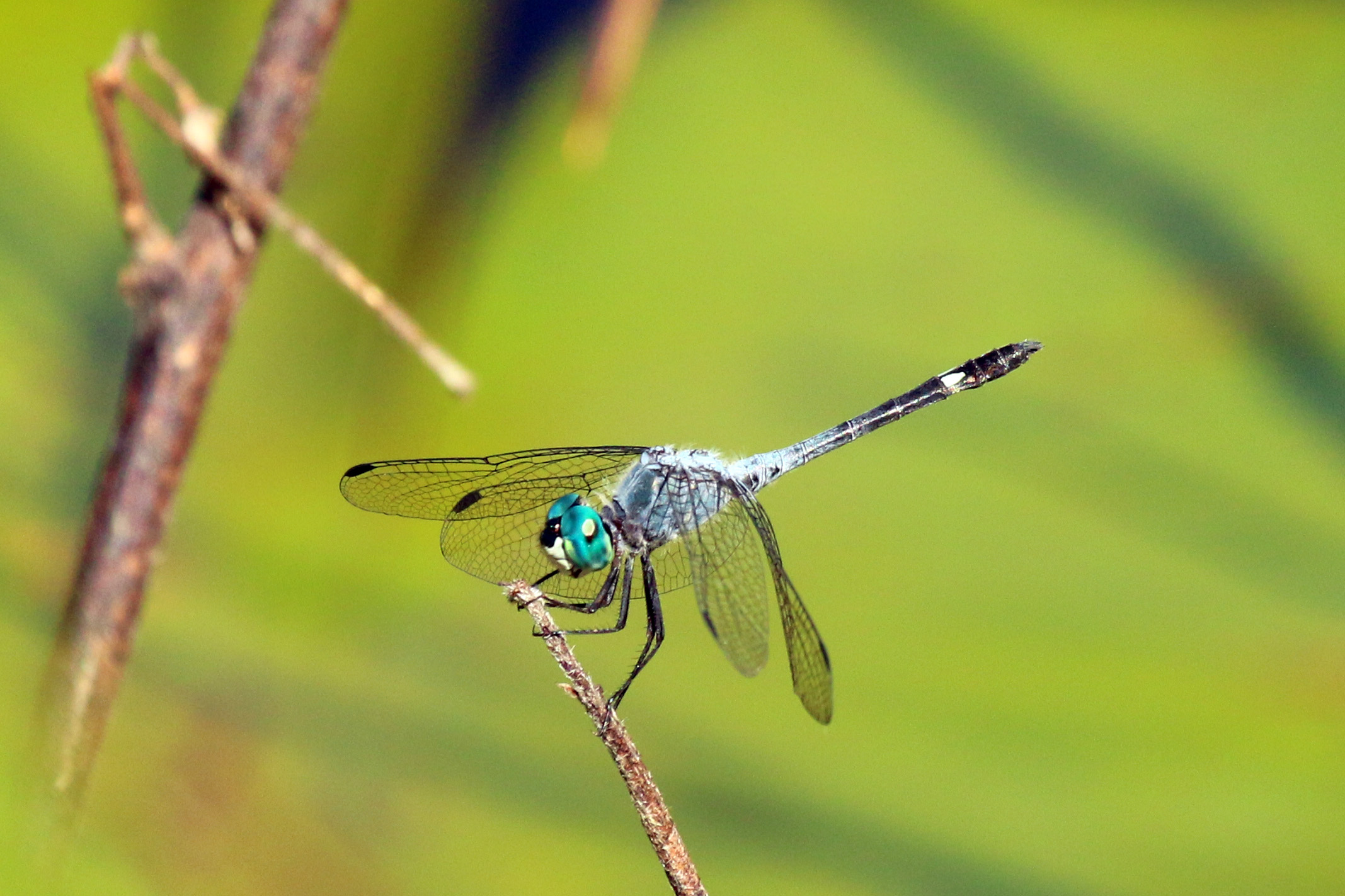
male M. aequalis, Tobago

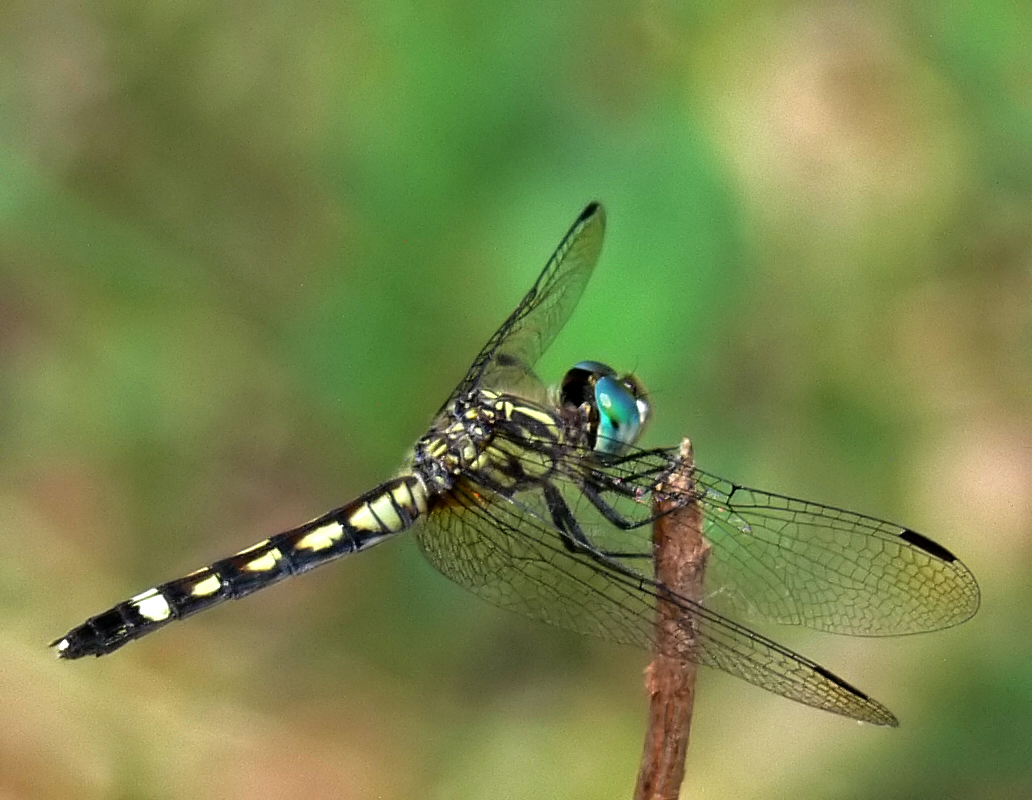
M. hagenii, Texas
