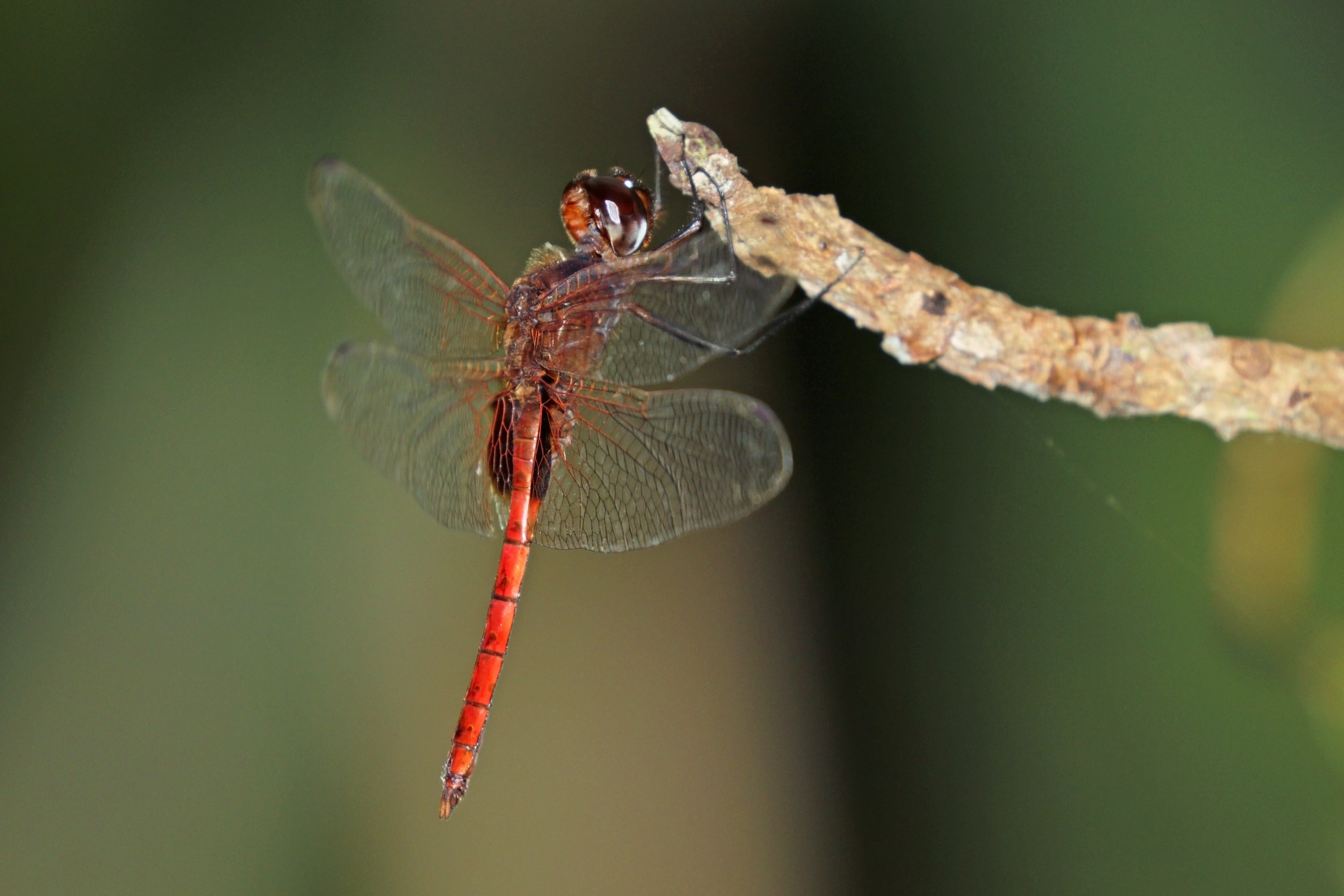
- Male garnet glider Tauriphila australis, Panama

Scientific classification
- Kingdom: Animalia
- Phylum: Arthropoda
- Class: Insecta
- Order: Odonata
- Infraorder: Anisoptera
- Family: Libellulidae
- Subfamily: Trameinae
- Tribe: Trameini
- Genus: Tauriphila; W. F. Kirby, 1889

= Tauriphila =

Genus of dragonflies

Tauriphila is a genus of dragonflies in the family Libellulidae. They are commonly known as Pasture Gliders. The species are neotropical with two, the Garnet and Aztec Gliders reaching the southern USA.

== Species ==
The genus contains the following species:

Male	Female	Scientific name	Common name	Distribution
		Tauriphila argo (Hagen, 1869)	Arch-tipped Glider	South America
		Tauriphila australis (Hagen, 1867)	Garnet Glider	South Florida, Central and South America
		Tauriphila argo (Hagen, 1869)	Arch-tipped glider	South America
		Tauriphila azteca Calvert, 1906	Aztec Glider	Central America and North America
		Tauriphila risi Martin, 1896		South America
		Tauriphila xiphea Ris, 1913		South America
