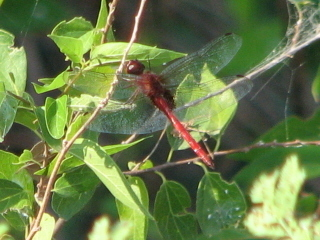

Conservation status
- Least Concern (IUCN 3.1)

Scientific classification
- Kingdom: Animalia
- Phylum: Arthropoda
- Class: Insecta
- Order: Odonata
- Infraorder: Anisoptera
- Family: Libellulidae
- Genus: Tauriphila
- Species: T. argo

Binomial name
- Tauriphila argo (Hagen, 1869)

= Tauriphila argo =

Species of dragonfly

Tauriphila argo, the arch-tipped glider, is a species of skimmer in the dragonfly family Libellulidae. It is found in South America.

The IUCN conservation status of Tauriphila argo is "LC", least concern, with no immediate threat to the species' survival. The population is stable. The IUCN status was reviewed in 2017.
