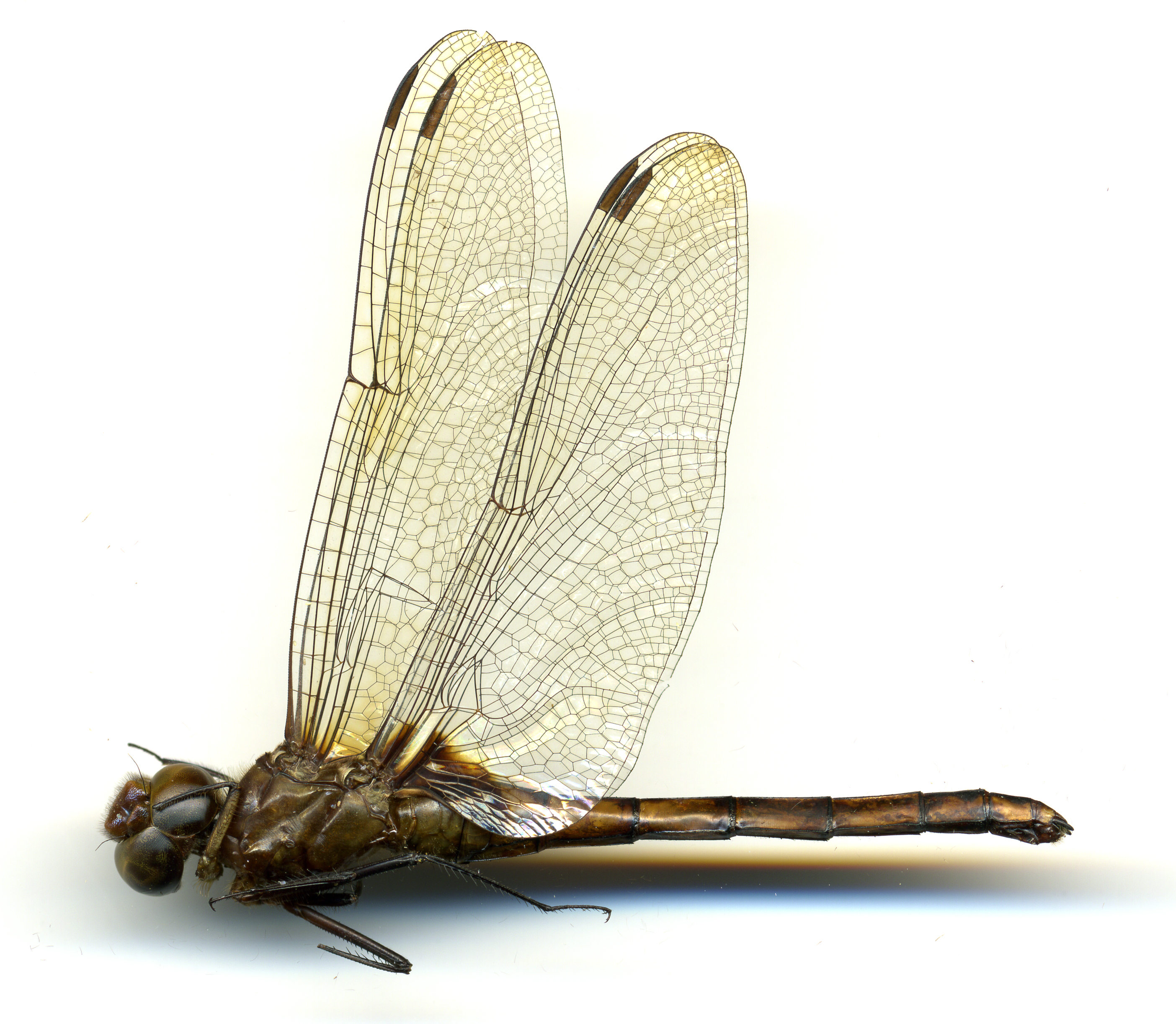

Conservation status
- Least Concern (IUCN 3.1)

Scientific classification
- Kingdom: Animalia
- Phylum: Arthropoda
- Class: Insecta
- Order: Odonata
- Infraorder: Anisoptera
- Family: Libellulidae
- Genus: Tauriphila
- Species: T. azteca

Binomial name
- Tauriphila azteca Calvert, 1906

= Tauriphila azteca =

Species of dragonfly

Tauriphila azteca, the Aztec glider, is a species of skimmer in the dragonfly family Libellulidae. It is found in Central America and North America.

The IUCN conservation status of Tauriphila azteca is "LC", least concern, with no immediate threat to the species' survival. The population is stable. The IUCN status was reviewed in 2017.
