= Antlion (disambiguation) =

Antlion is a name applied to a group of about 2,000 species of insects in the family Myrmeleontidae.

Antlion or Ant lion may also refer to:

- Myrmecoleon or ant-lion, a fantastical beast of ancient and medieval times
- Ant lion (Dungeons & Dragons), creature in Dungeons & Dragons
