= Clathroneuria coquilletti =

Scientific classification
- Domain: Eukaryota
- Kingdom: Animalia
- Phylum: Arthropoda
- Class: Insecta
- Order: Neuroptera
- Family: Myrmeleontidae
- Genus: Clathroneuria
- Species: C. coquilletti

Binomial name
- Clathroneuria coquilletti (Currie, 1898)

Synonyms
- Brachynemurus coquilletti Currie, 1898

Species of insect

Clathroneuria coquilletti is a species of antlion in the family Myrmeleontidae. It is found in Central America and North America.
