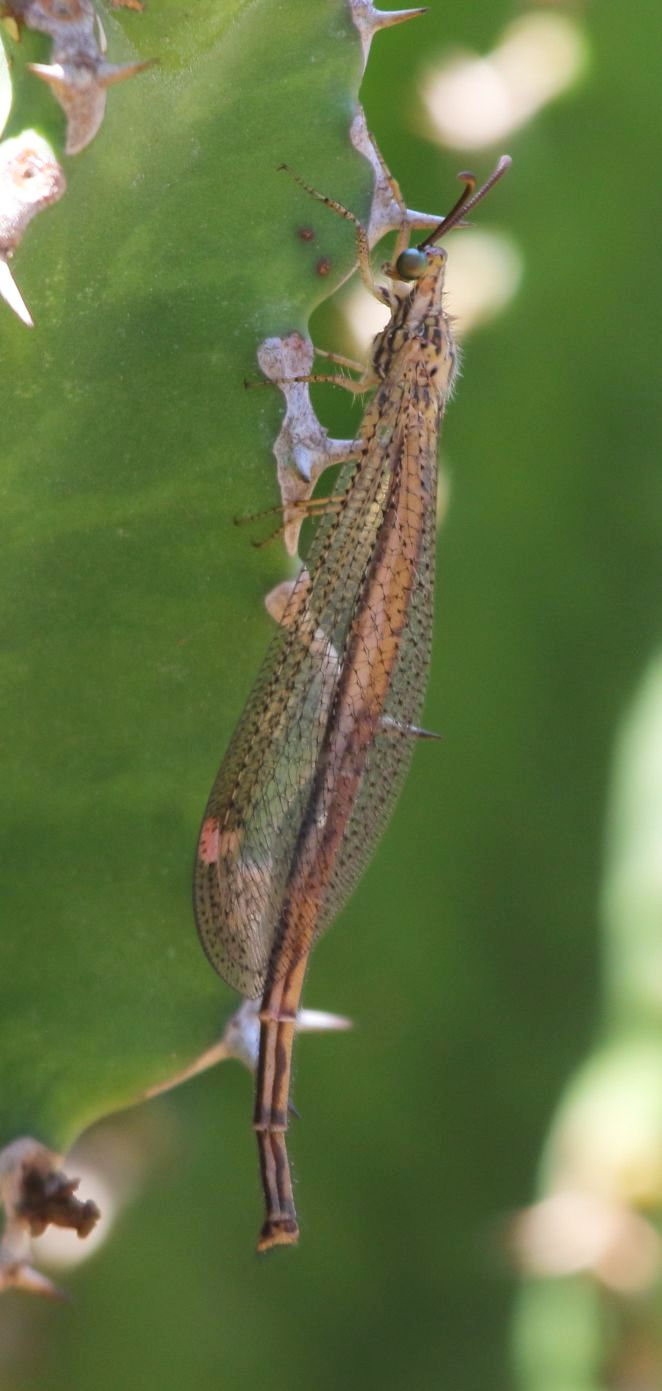
- Cueta trivirgata

Scientific classification
- Kingdom: Animalia
- Phylum: Arthropoda
- Clade: Pancrustacea
- Class: Insecta
- Order: Neuroptera
- Family: Myrmeleontidae
- Subfamily: Myrmeleontinae
- Tribe: Nesoleontini
- Genus: Cueta; Navas, 1911

Species
- See text

= Cueta =

Genus of insects

Cueta is an antlion genus in the family Myrmeleonidae.

== Species ==
The genus has about 74 species.

== Gallery ==
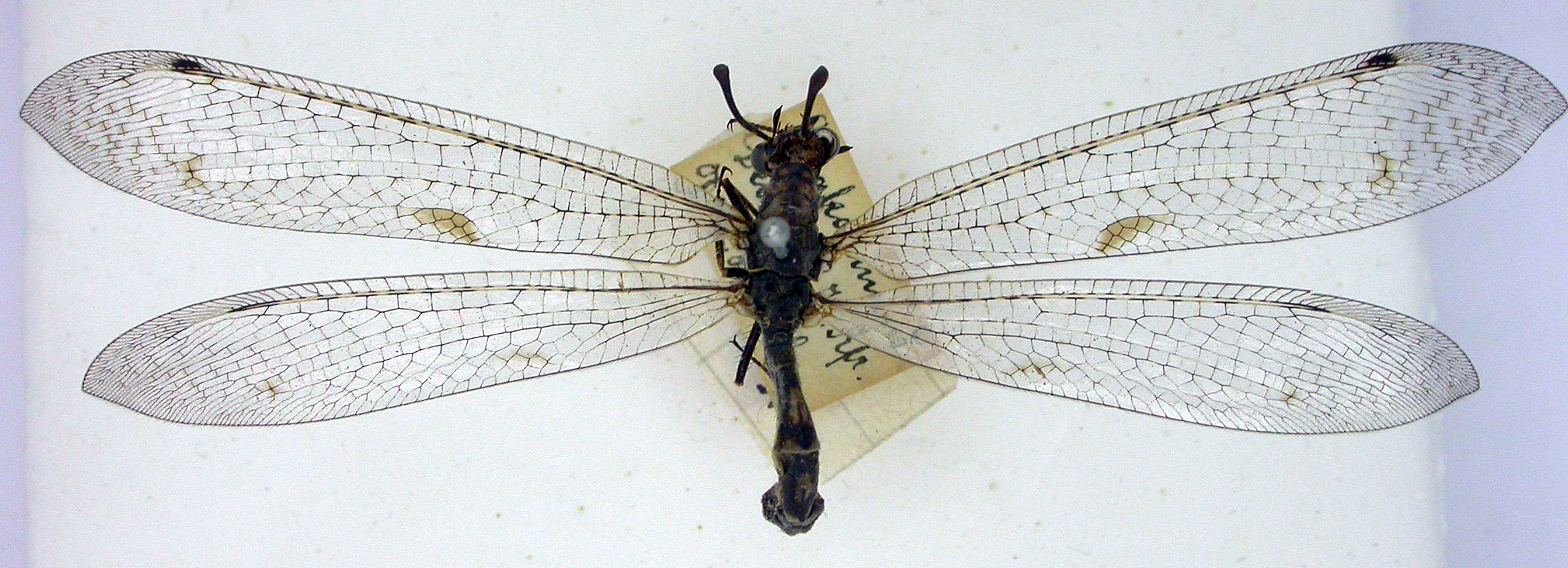
Cueta lunata type, stored in the ZSM collection

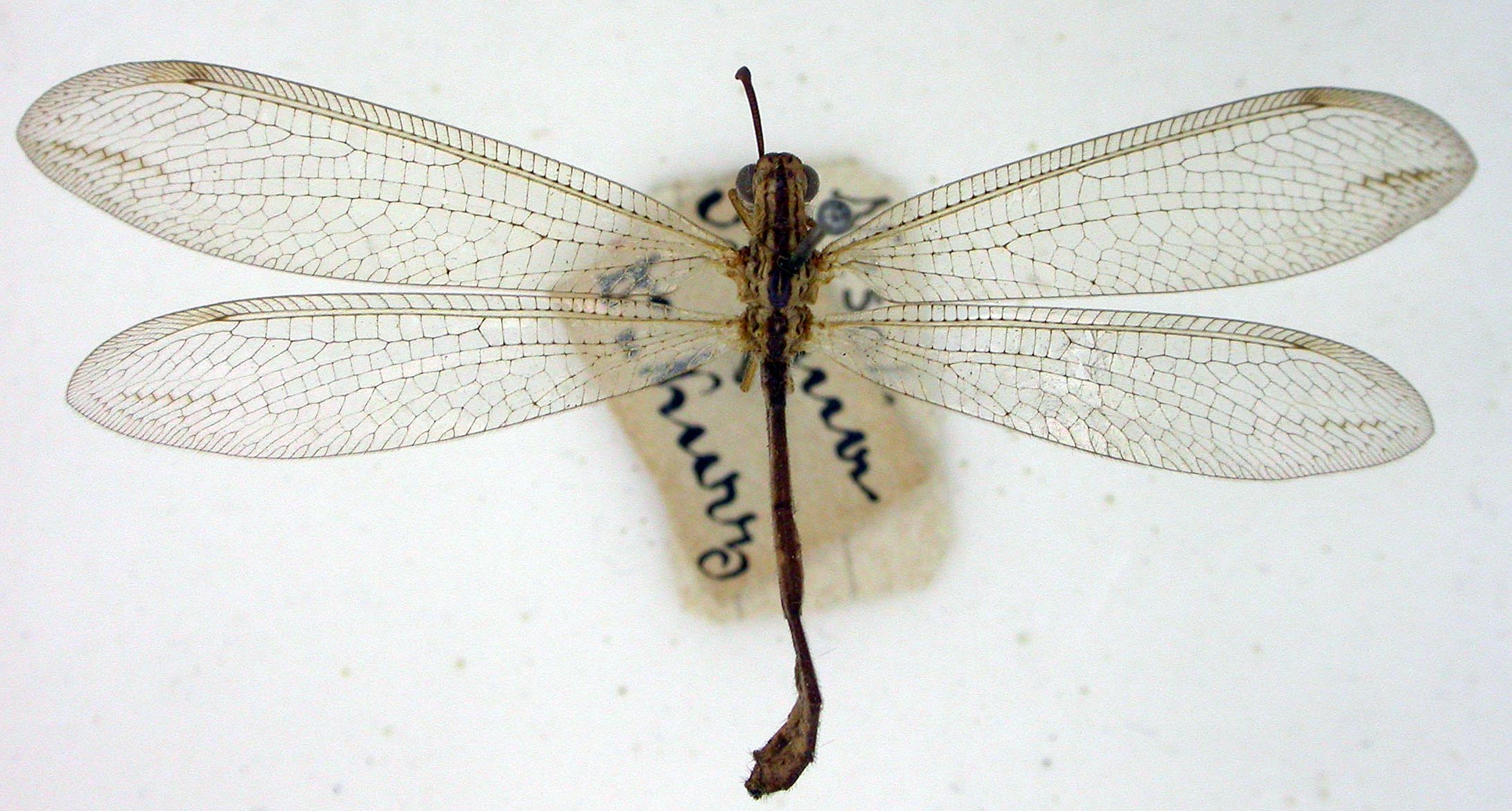
Cueta kurzi type, stored in ZSM collection

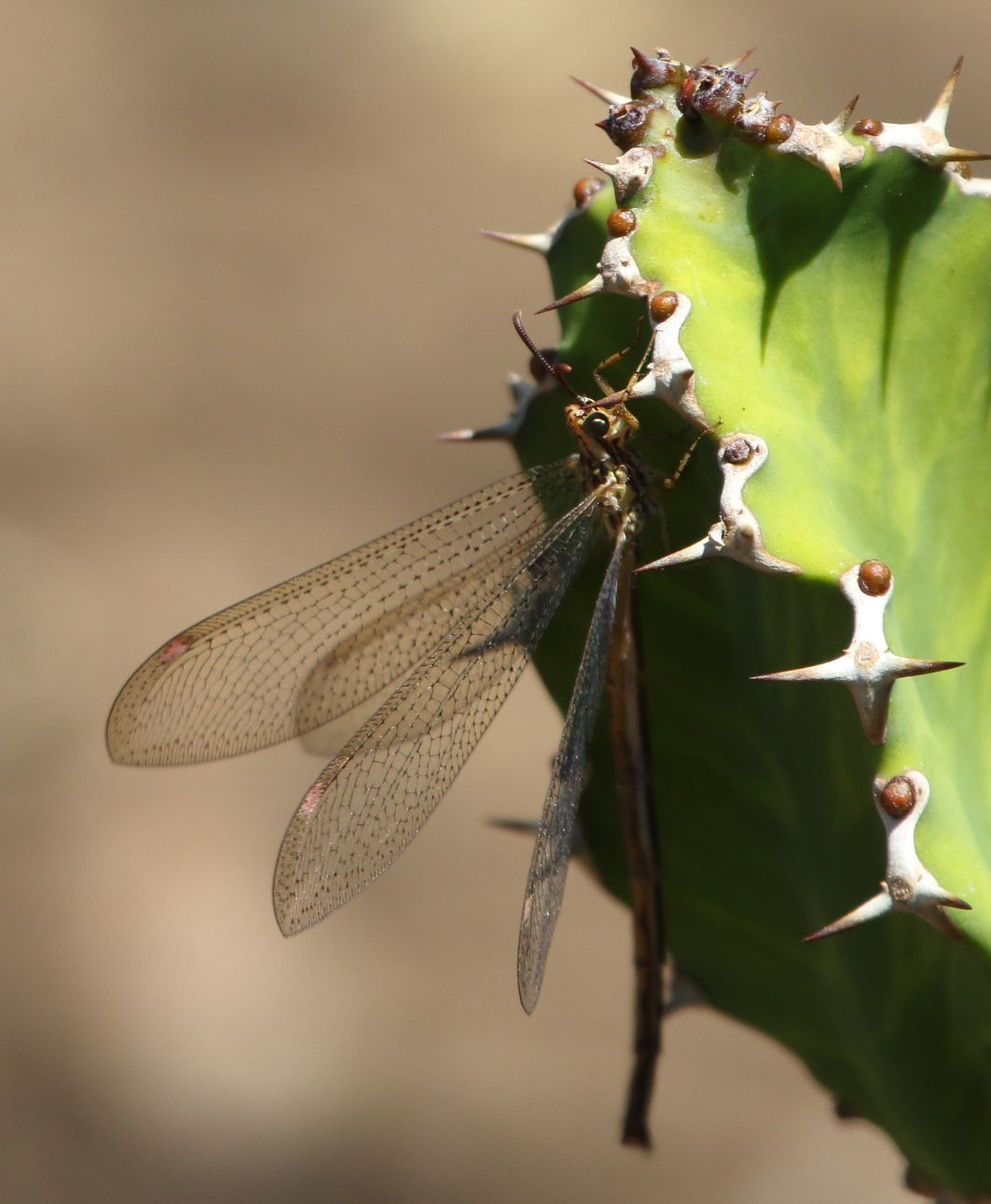
Cueta trivirgata in KwaZulu-Natal
