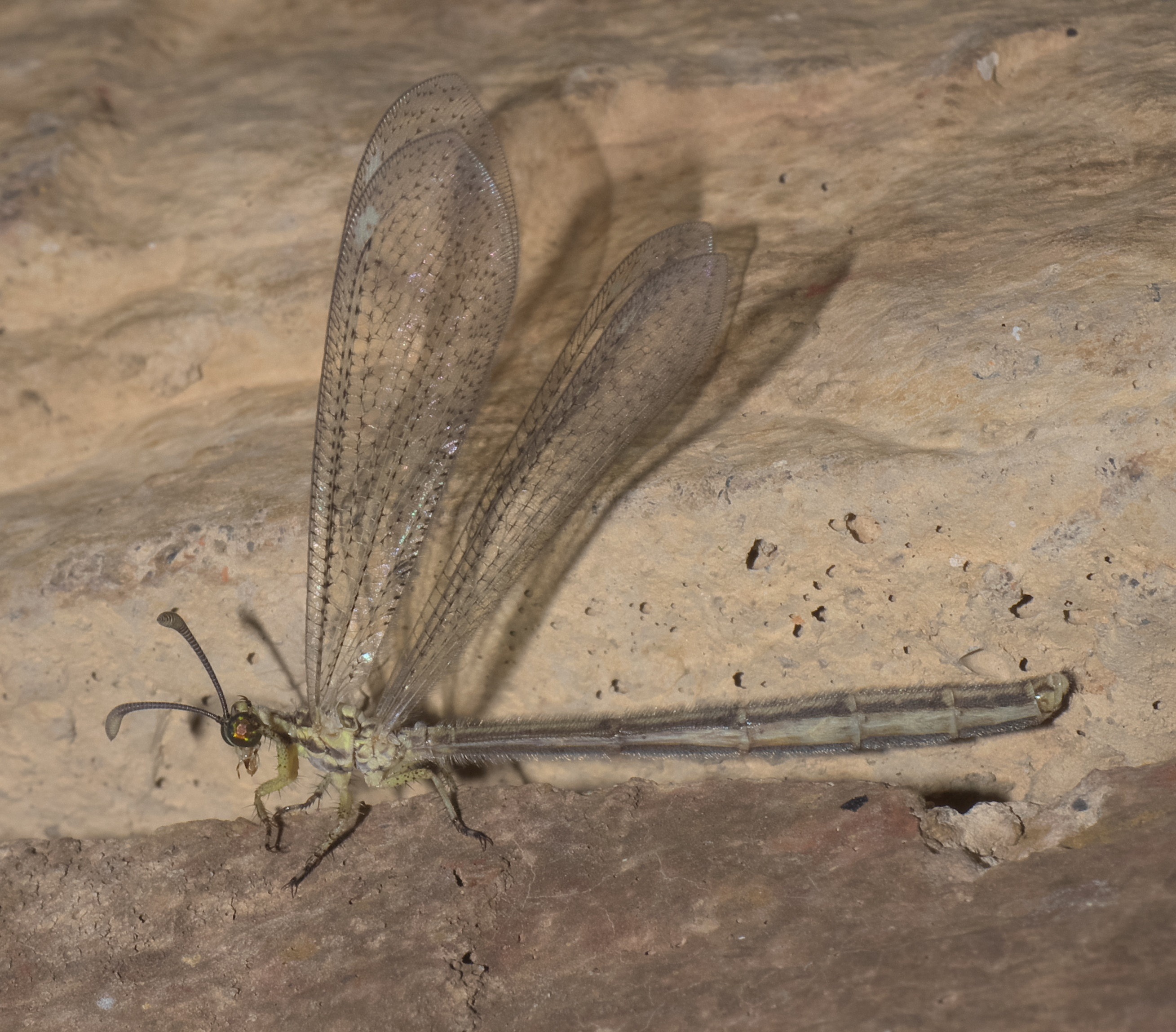
- Brachynemurus abdominalis

Scientific classification
- Domain: Eukaryota
- Kingdom: Animalia
- Phylum: Arthropoda
- Class: Insecta
- Order: Neuroptera
- Family: Myrmeleontidae
- Subfamily: Myrmeleontinae
- Tribe: Brachynemurini; Banks, 1927

= Brachynemurini =

Tribe of insects

Brachynemurini is a tribe of antlions in the family Myrmeleontidae within the subfamily Myrmeleontinae. There are 28 genera and 117 described species in Brachynemurini.

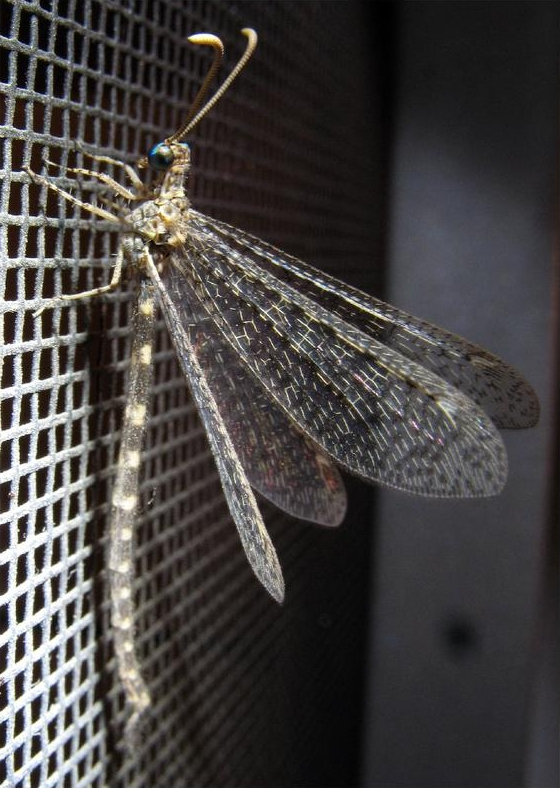
Brachynemurus sackeni

== Genera ==
- Abatoleon Banks, 1924 (3 spp.)
- Ameromyia Banks, 1913 (12 spp.)
- Argentoleon Stange, 1994 (2 spp.)
- Atricholeon Stange, 1994 (2 spp.)
- Austroleon Banks, 1909 (3 spp.)
- Brachynemurus Hagen, 1888 (22 spp.)
- Chaetoleon Banks, 1920 (4 spp.)
- Clathroneuria Banks, 1913 (5 spp.)
- Dejuna Navás, 1924 (5 spp.)
- Dejunaleon Miller & Stange 2017 (2 spp.)
- Ecualeon Stange, 1994 (1 sp.)
- Elicura Navás, 1911 (3 spp.)
- Enrera Navás, 1915 (1 sp.)
- Ensorra Navás, 1915 (1 sp.)
- Galapagoleon Stange, 1994 (1 sp.)
- Gnopholeon Stange, 1970 (3 spp.)
- Jaffuelia Navás, 1918 (2 sp.)
- Lemolemus Navás 1911 (3 spp.)
- Maracandula Currie, 1901 (5 spp.)
- Menkeleon Stange, 1970 (1 sp.)
- Mexoleon Stange, 1994 (2 sp.)
- Neulatus Navás, 1912 (1 sp.)
- Peruveleon Miller & Stange, 2011 (5 spp.)
- Scotoleon Banks, 1913 (22 spp.)
- Sical Navás, 1928 (3 spp.)
- Stangeleon Miller, 2008 (1 sp.)
- Tyttholeon Adams, 1957 (1 sp.)
- Venezueleon Stange, 1994 (1 sp.)
