= Mexoleon =

Scientific classification
- Domain: Eukaryota
- Kingdom: Animalia
- Phylum: Arthropoda
- Class: Insecta
- Order: Neuroptera
- Family: Myrmeleontidae
- Tribe: Brachynemurini
- Genus: Mexoleon; Stange, 1994

Genus of insects

Mexoleon is a genus of antlions in the family Myrmeleontidae. There are at least two described species in Mexoleon.

== Species ==
These two species belong to the genus Mexoleon:

- Mexoleon mixtecus (Stange, 1970)
- Mexoleon papago (Currie, 1899)
