= Clathroneuria schwarzi =

Scientific classification
- Kingdom: Animalia
- Phylum: Arthropoda
- Class: Insecta
- Order: Neuroptera
- Family: Myrmeleontidae
- Genus: Clathroneuria
- Species: C. schwarzi

Binomial name
- Clathroneuria schwarzi (Currie, 1903)

Synonyms
- Brachynemurus schwarzi Currie, 1903

Species of insect

Clathroneuria schwarzi is a species of antlion in the family Myrmeleontidae. It is found in Central America and North America.
