= Clathroneuria =

Scientific classification
- Domain: Eukaryota
- Kingdom: Animalia
- Phylum: Arthropoda
- Class: Insecta
- Order: Neuroptera
- Family: Myrmeleontidae
- Tribe: Brachynemurini
- Genus: Clathroneuria; Banks, 1913

Genus of insects

Clathroneuria is a genus of antlions in the family Myrmeleontidae. There are about five described species in Clathroneuria.

== Species ==
- Clathroneuria arapahoe Banks, 1938
- Clathroneuria coquilletti (Currie, 1898)
- Clathroneuria navajo Banks, 1938
- Clathroneuria schwarzi (Currie, 1903)
- Clathroneuria westcotti (Stange, 1970)
