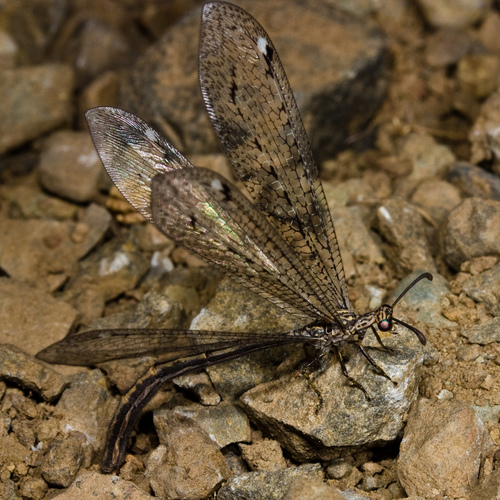

Scientific classification
- Domain: Eukaryota
- Kingdom: Animalia
- Phylum: Arthropoda
- Class: Insecta
- Order: Neuroptera
- Family: Myrmeleontidae
- Genus: Mexoleon
- Species: M. papago

Binomial name
- Mexoleon papago (Currie, 1899)

Synonyms
- Brachynemurus papago Currie, 1899

= Mexoleon papago =

Species of insect

Mexoleon papago is a species of antlion in the family Myrmeleontidae. It is found in Central America and North America.
