= Martin Frobenius Ledermüller =

German naturalist and jurist (1719–1769)

- Born: Martin Frobenius Ledermüller; 20 August 1719; Nuremberg, Electorate of Bavaria, Holy Roman Empire
- Died: 16 May 1769 (aged 49); Nuremberg, Electorate of Bavaria, Holy Roman Empire
- Known for: Mikroskopische Gemüths- und Augen-Ergötzung (1759–1763); Microscopic observations and illustrations Advocacy for microscopy as an educational tool
- Scientific career
- Fields: Microscopy, Natural history, Scientific illustration
- Institutions: Margrave of Brandenburg's natural history collection

Martin Frobenius Ledermüller (20 August 1719 – 16 May 1769) was a German jurist, naturalist, microscopist, and illustrator. Known for his work in microscopy and natural history illustration, he contributed significantly to the Enlightenment-era understanding of the natural world.

== Early life and education ==
Ledermüller was born in Nuremberg, Germany, to Balthasar Ledermüller, a municipal clerk, and Helena Burckhardt. Despite his early interest in science and nature, his father initially forced him into a trade apprenticeship in spices. After three years, recognizing his son's persistent passion for intellectual pursuits, Balthasar allowed him to pursue legal studies. Martin eventually attended the University of Jena in 1739 to study philosophy and law but returned to Nuremberg after a year due to family pressures.

== Career ==
Ledermüller's career was diverse. After passing his notary examination in 1744, he worked as a legal clerk (Sollizitator) and later as a prosecutor (Prokurator) at Nuremberg's municipal court until 1760. However, his declining hearing forced him to leave legal work. He then devoted himself entirely to natural sciences and microscopy.

In addition to his legal career, Ledermüller served briefly as an assistant curator of the Margrave of Brandenburg's natural history collection in Bayreuth. This position allowed him to deepen his engagement with scientific research and illustration.

== Contributions to microscopy and natural history ==
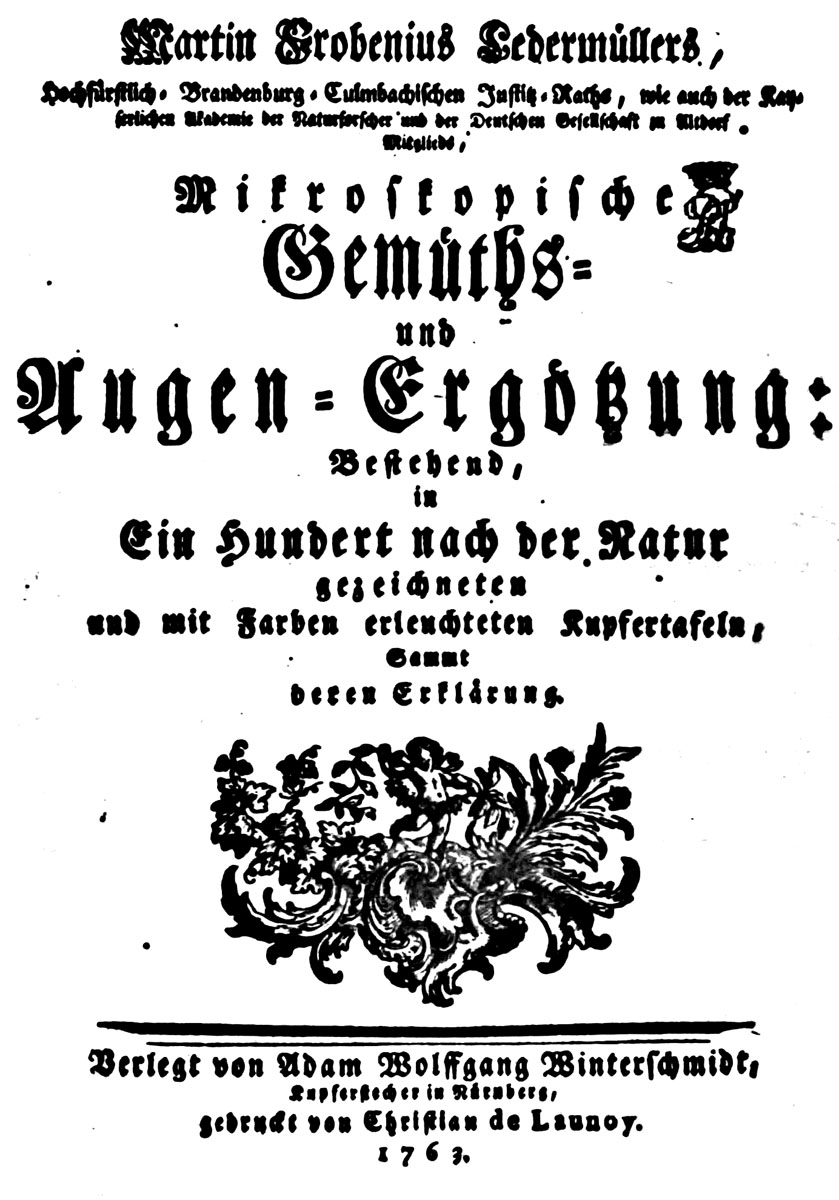
Cover of Mikroskopische Gemüths- und Augen-Ergötzung (1759–1763)

His magnum opus, Mikroskopische Gemüths- und Augen-Ergötzung (1759–1763), featured over 150 hand-colored copperplate engravings created by Adam Wolfgang Winterschmidt. These detailed illustrations depicted insects, plants, fungi, minerals, and other microscopic specimens with accuracy and artistic flair.

The work aimed to educate and entertain by revealing the hidden beauty of nature through microscopy. For example, Ledermüller described observing the intricate structures of butterfly wings or the movements of microscopic organisms with both scientific precision and poetic wonder.

Through his microscopic studies, Ledermüller dismissed the theory of spontaneous generation, aligning with emerging scientific views of the time. He promoted microscopy as an educational tool suitable even for young women, emphasizing its accessibility and intellectual benefits.

Ledermüller also occasionally named species based on their behavior or appearance under the microscope. For instance, he likened one aquatic insect's movements to those of a Harlequin from Italian theater.

== Death ==
Martin Frobenius Ledermüller died on 16 May 1769 in Nuremberg after suffering from prolonged health issues. His works continue to be celebrated for their blend of scientific rigor and artistic excellence.

== Gallery ==
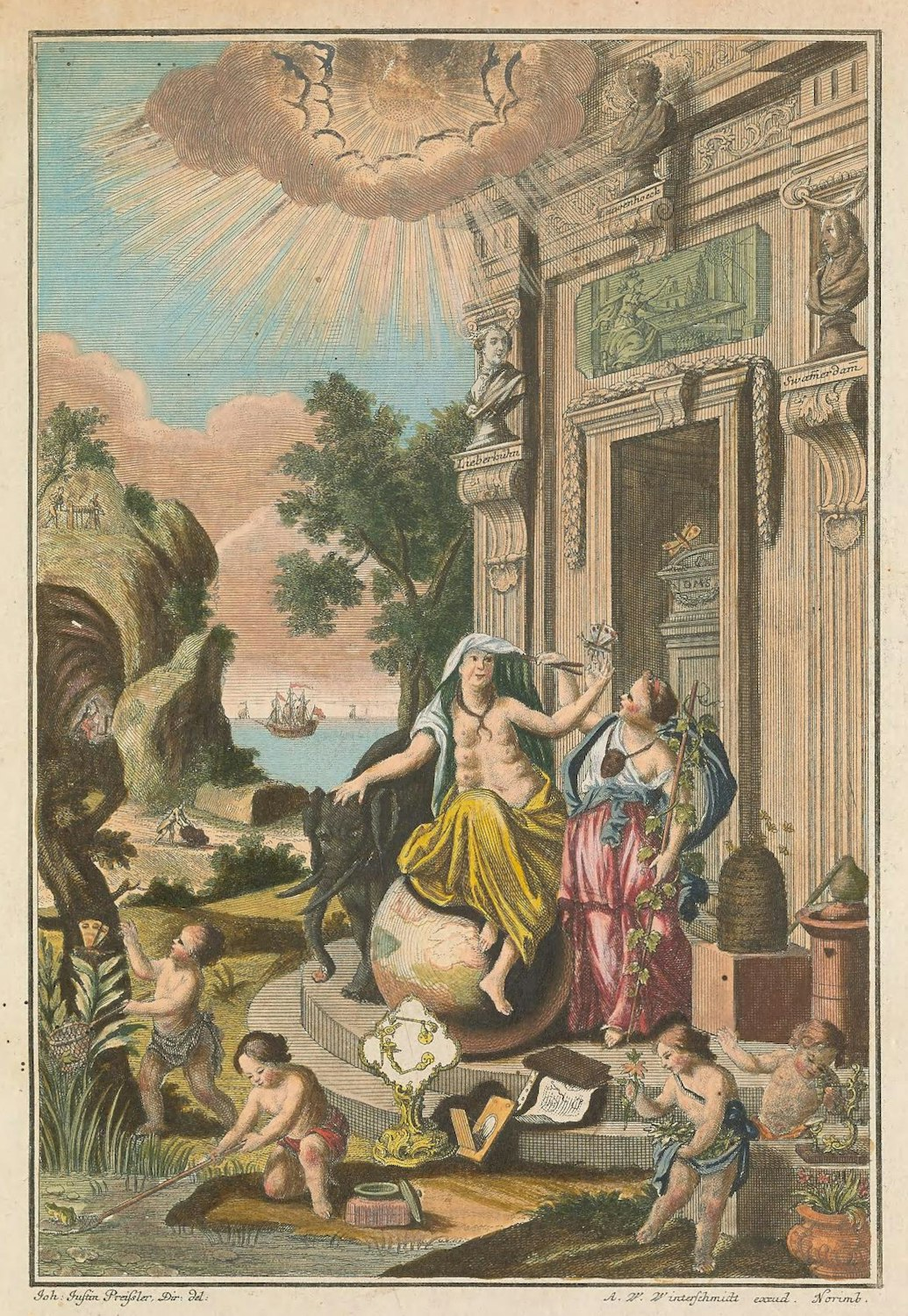
Frontispiece of Volume 1 of Microscopic Delights (1759–63)

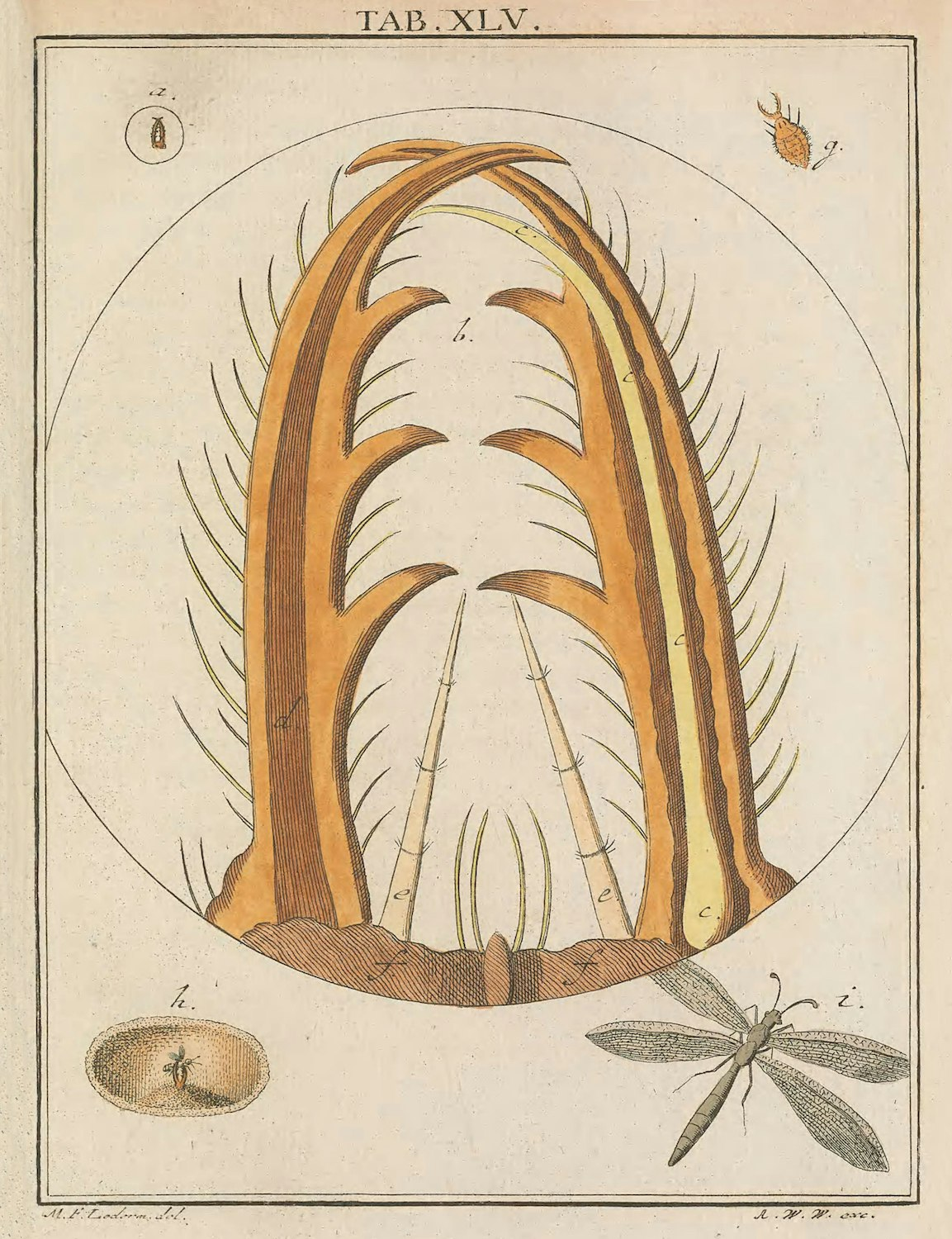
Antlion larva's pincers

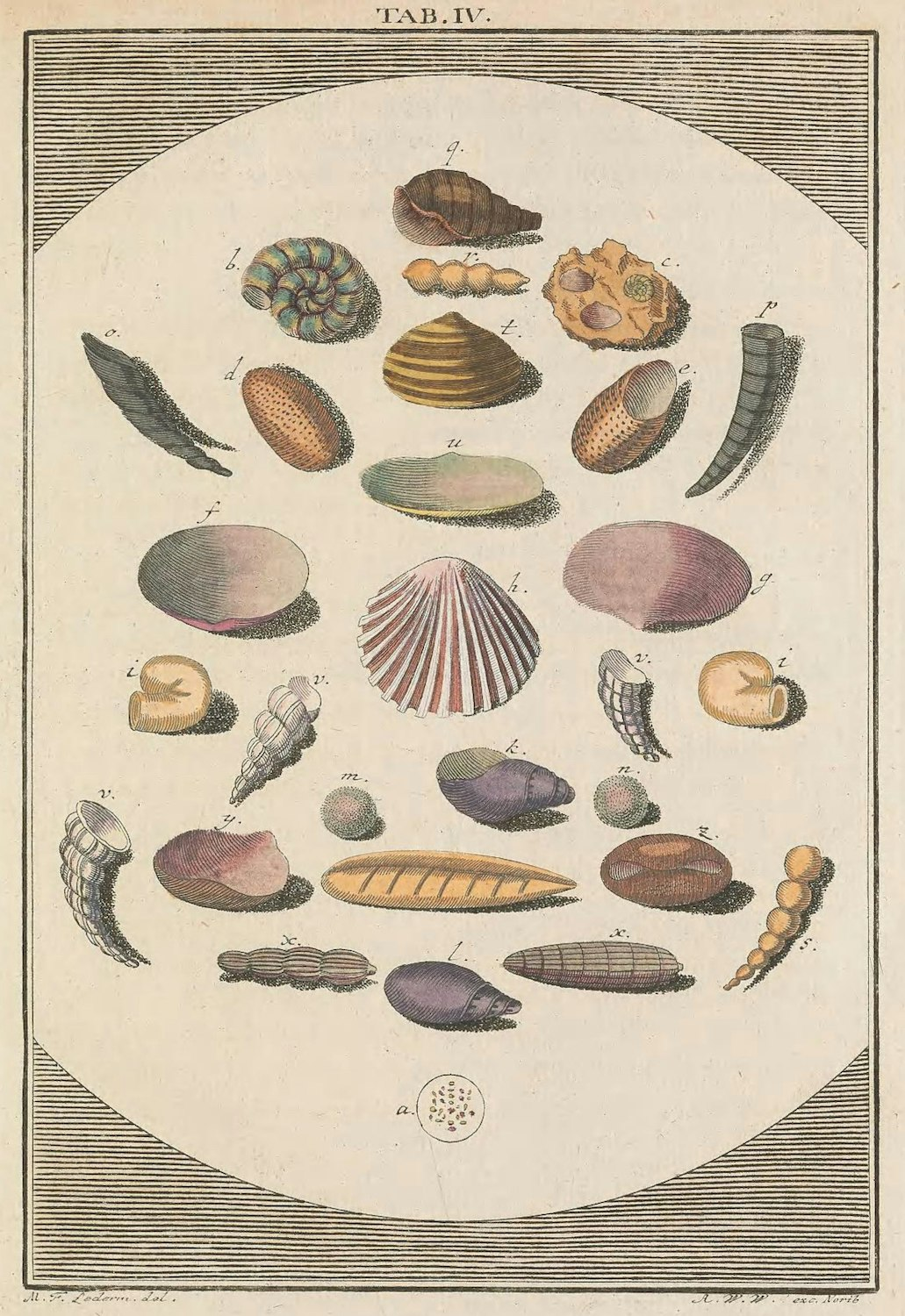
Mollusc shells

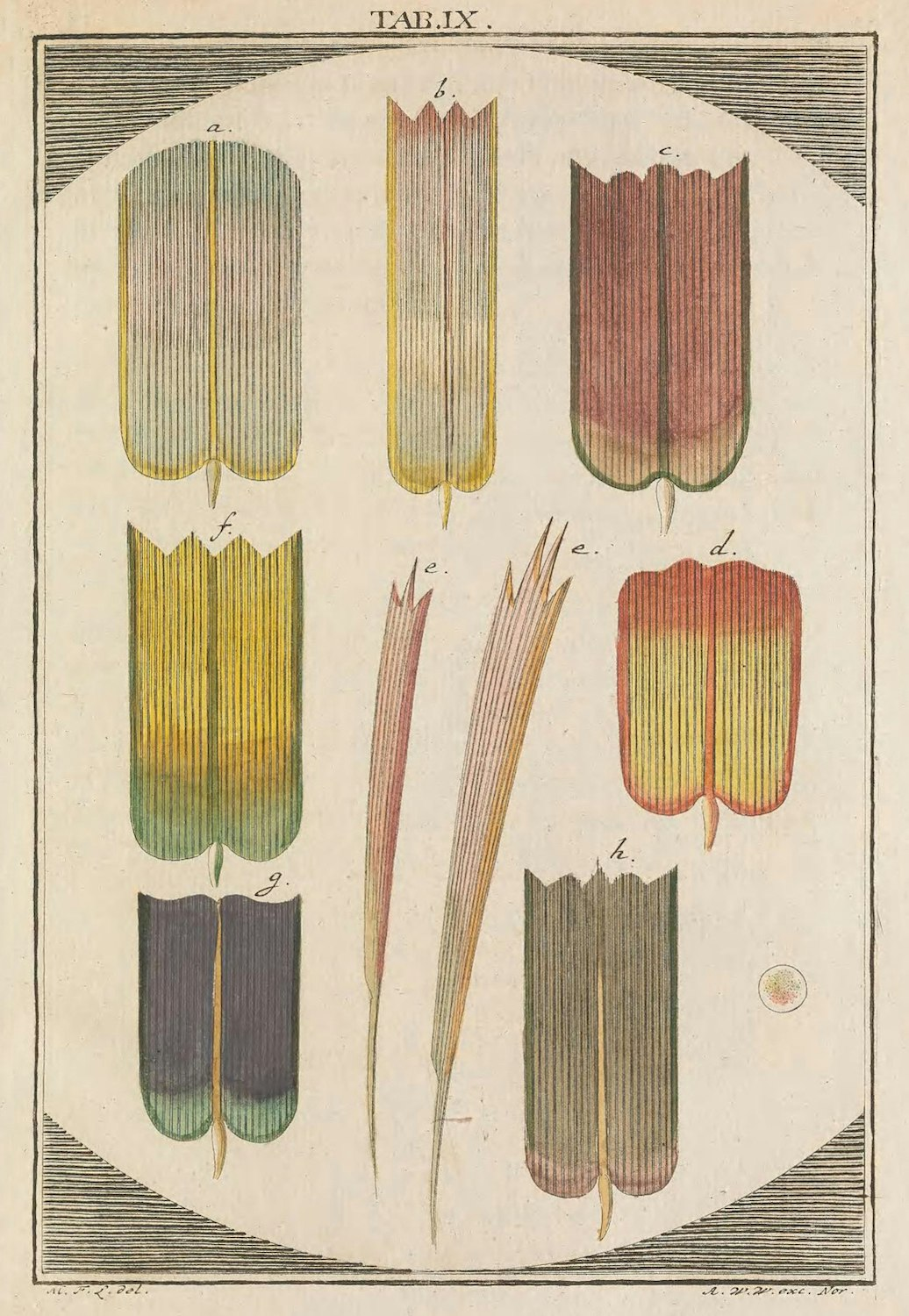
Butterfly wing scales

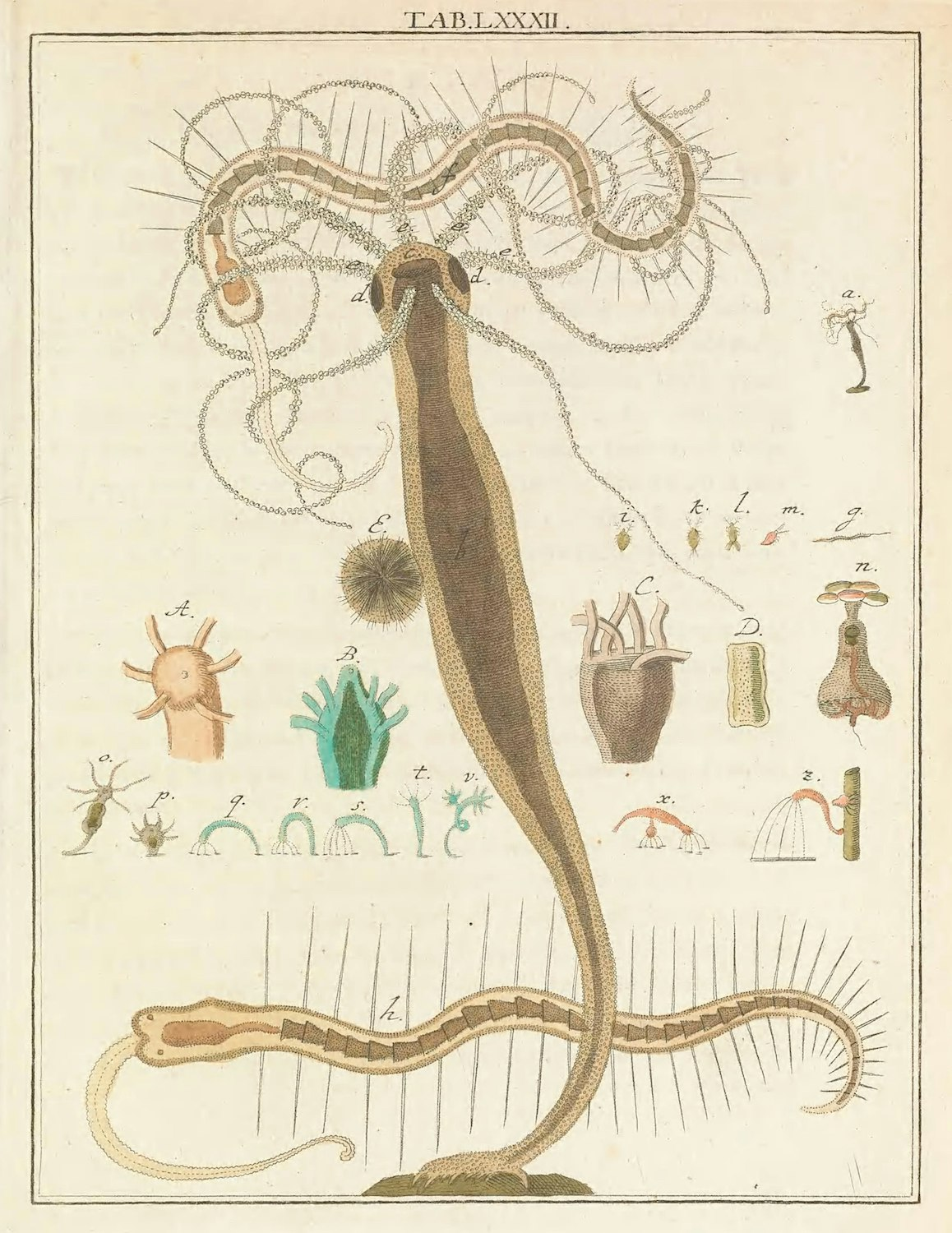
Hydras

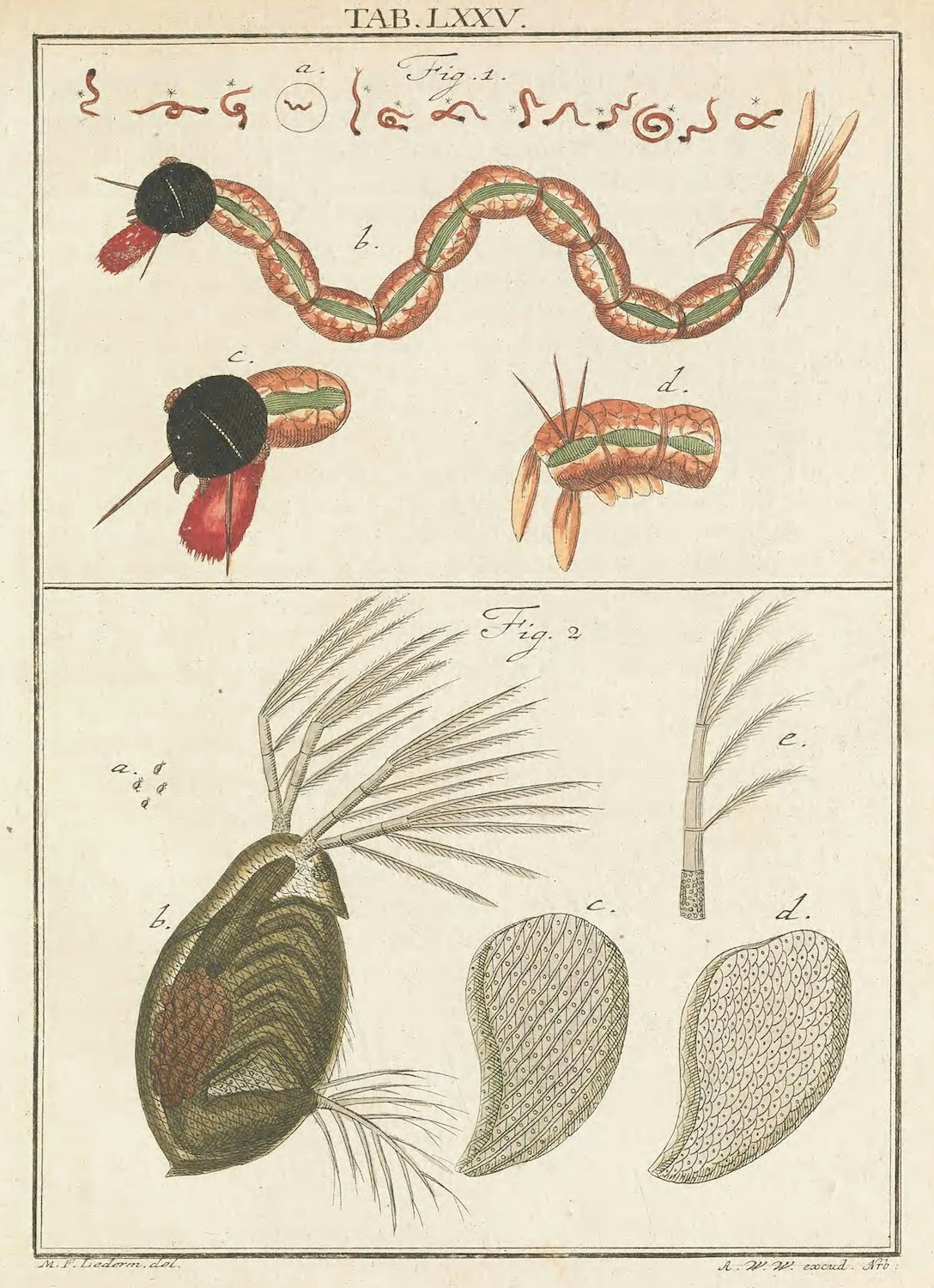
Harlequin or monocle insects

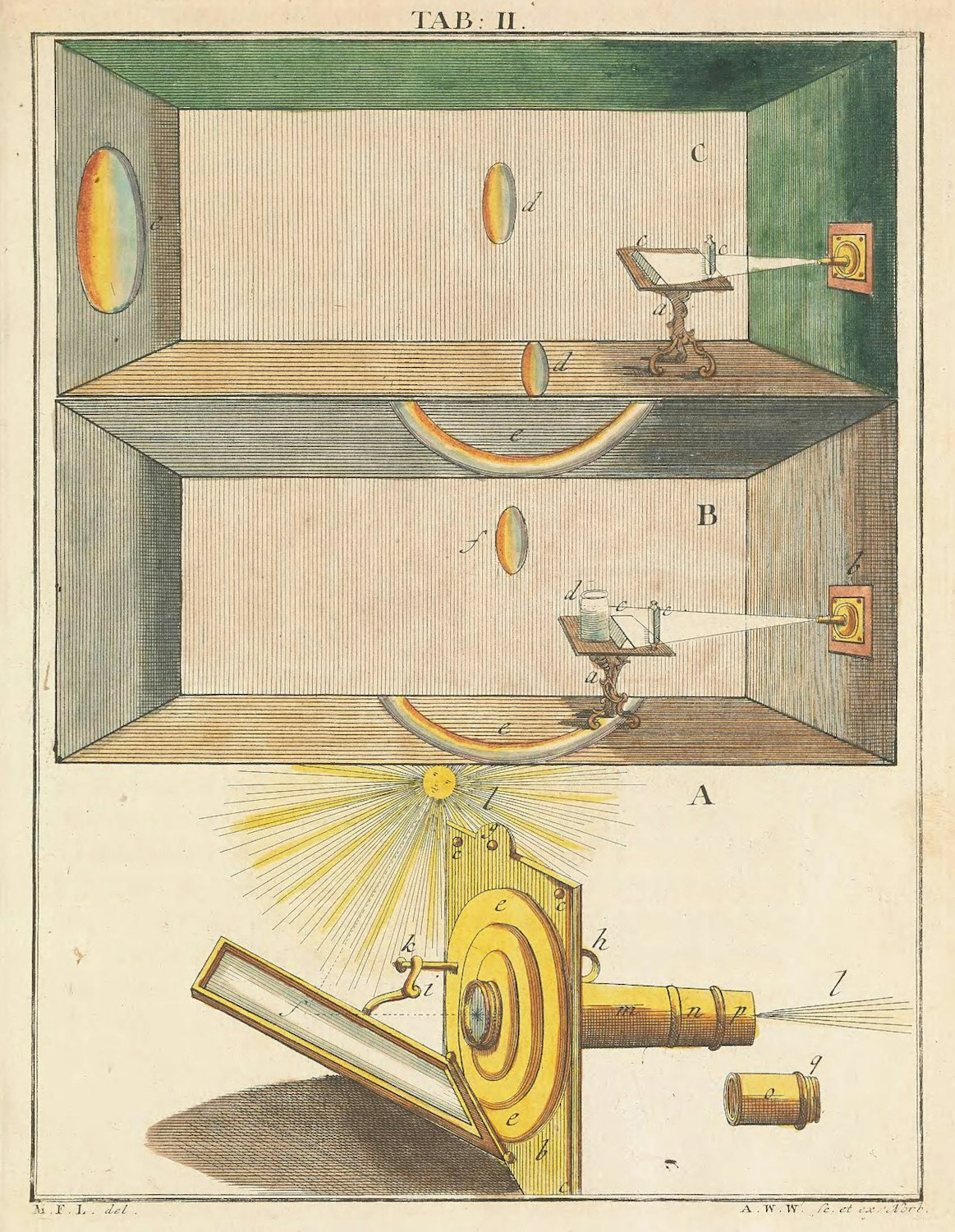
Solar microscope

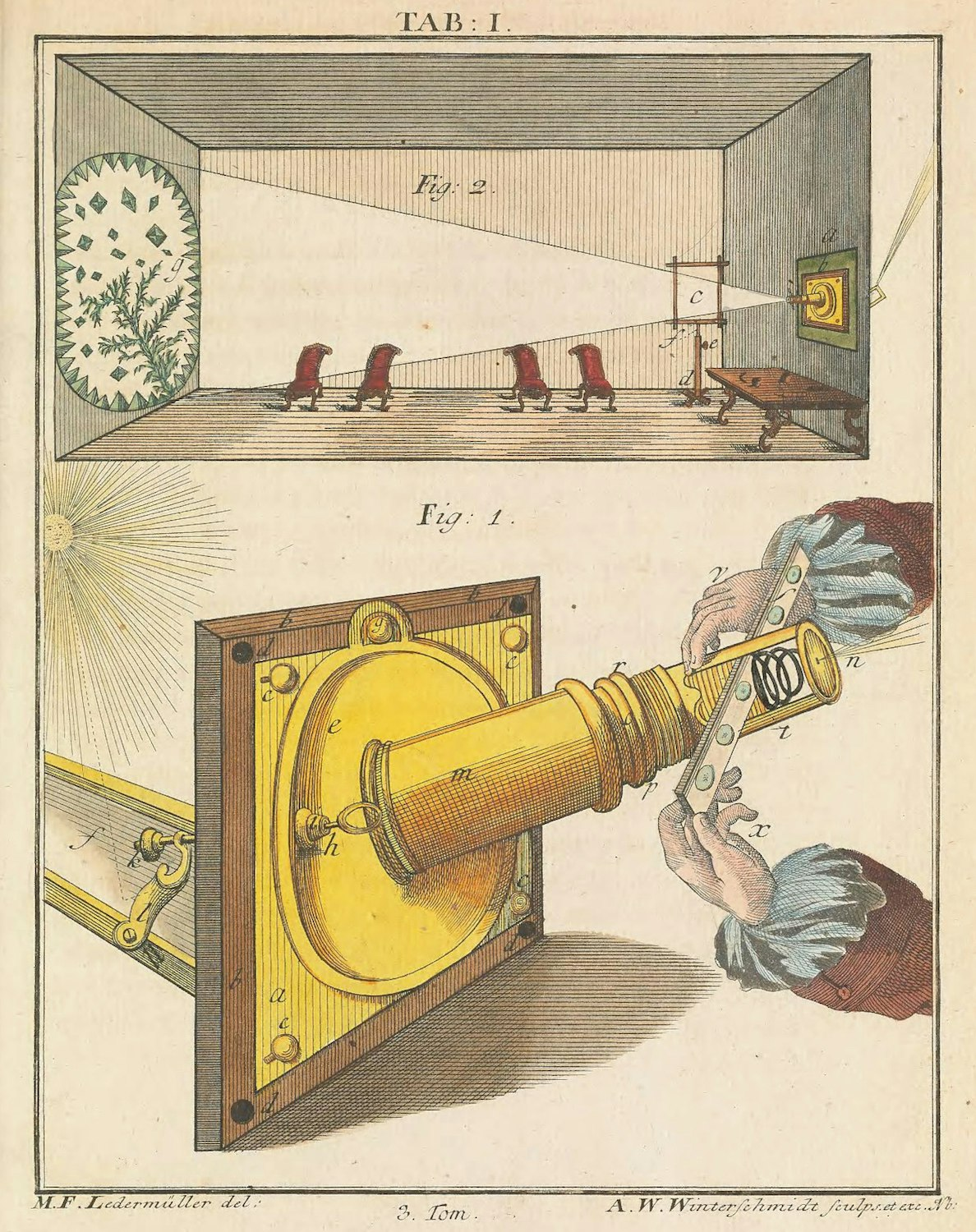
Solar microscope in camera obscura

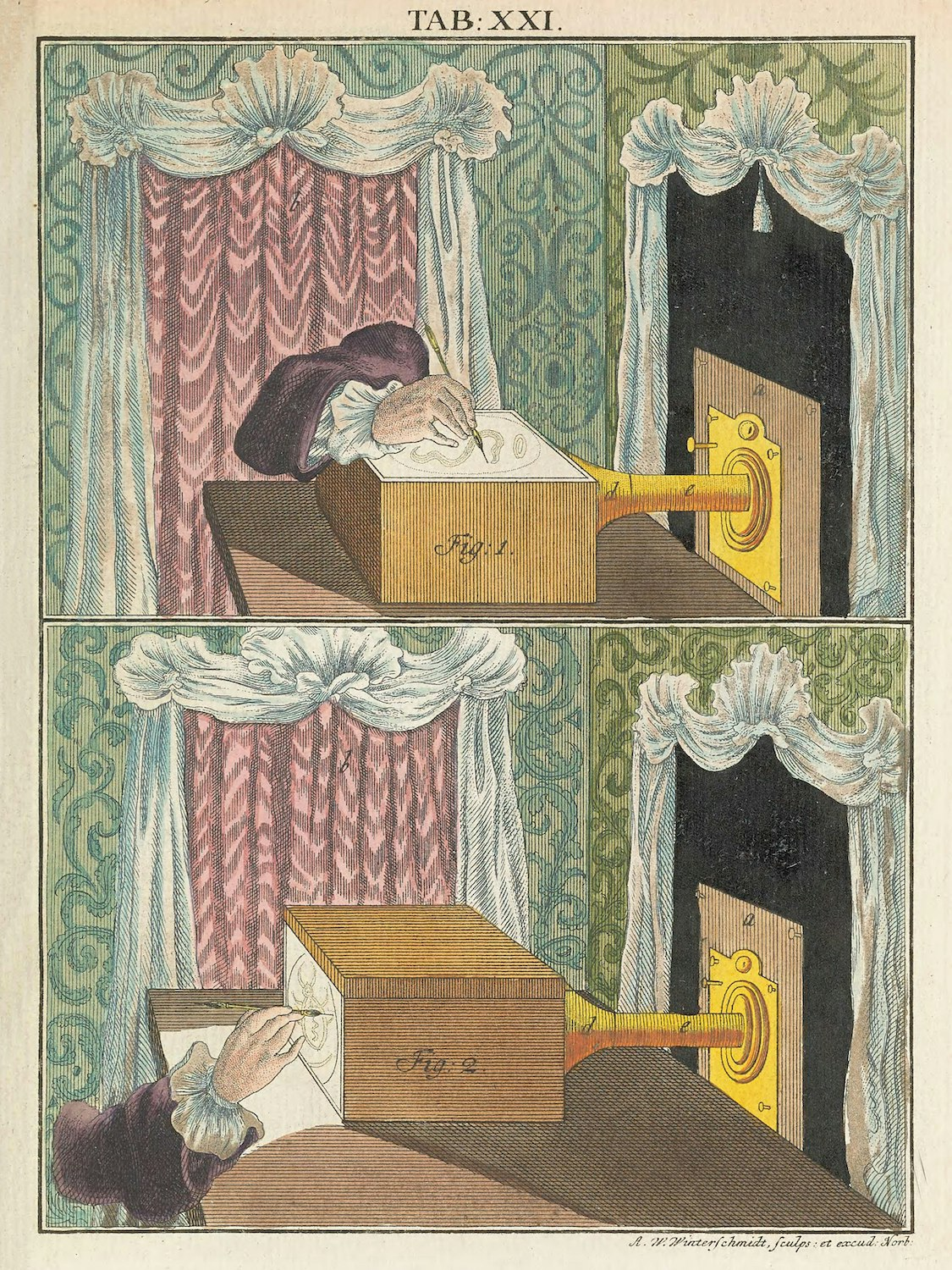
Drawing device for solar microscope

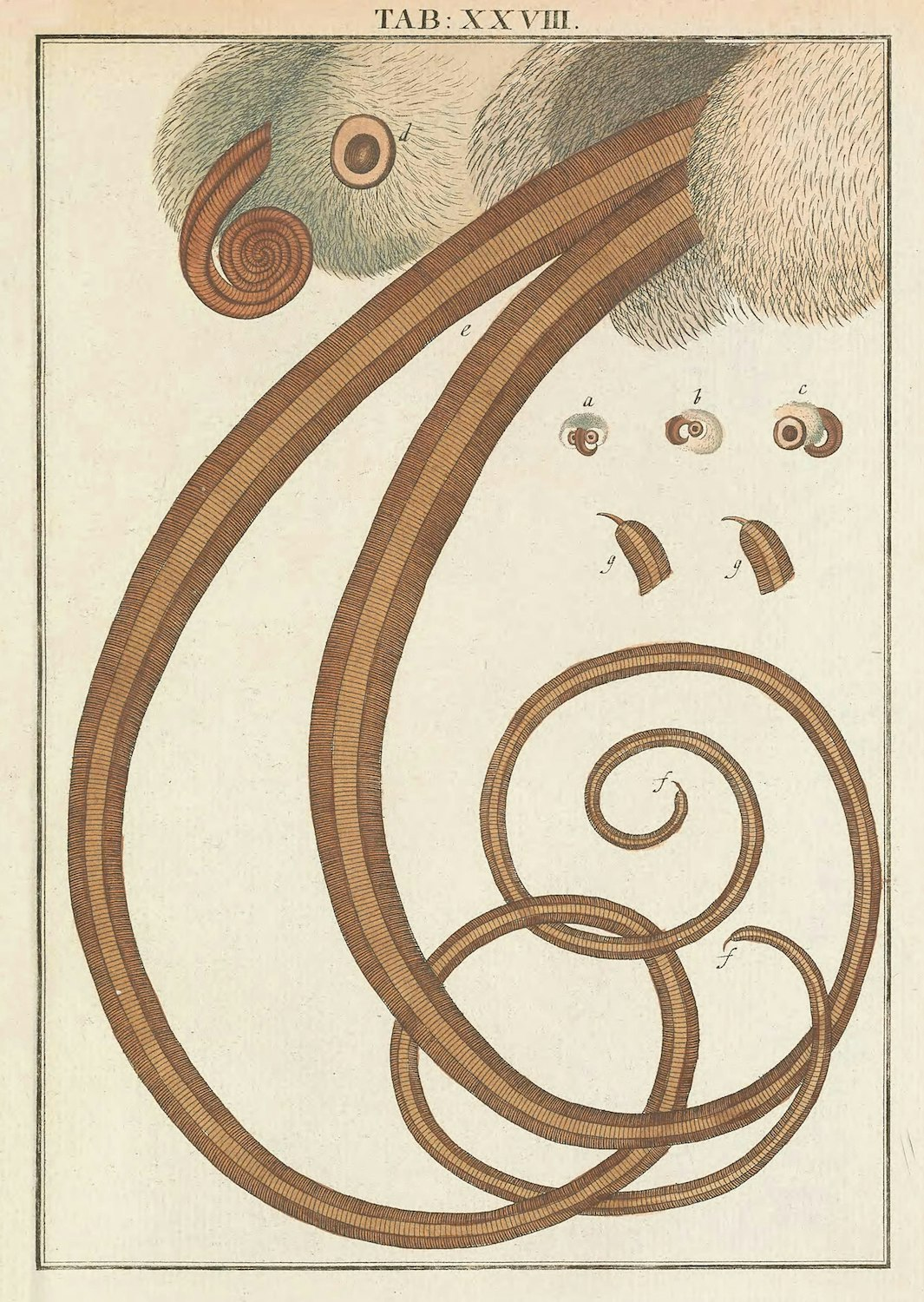
Moth mouth parts

== Selected works ==
- Mikroskopische Gemüths- und Augen-Ergötzung (1759–1763): A three-volume masterpiece featuring hand-colored engravings of microscopic observations.
- Physikalisch-mikroskopische Abhandlung vom Asbest (1775): A posthumously published treatise on asbestos and related minerals under the microscope.

== See also ==
- Scientific Revolution
- Biological illustration
- Botanical illustration
