= Nesoleontini =

Scientific classification
- Kingdom: Animalia
- Phylum: Arthropoda
- Class: Insecta
- Order: Neuroptera
- Family: Myrmeleontidae
- Subfamily: Myrmeleontinae
- Tribe: Nesoleontini; Markl, 1954

Tribe of insects

Nesoleontini is a tribe in the antlion subfamily Myrmeleontinae.

== Genera ==
There are 3 genera of Nesoleontini comprising 80 species.

- Cueta Navás, 1911
- Nadus Navás, 1935
- Nesoleon Banks, 1909
