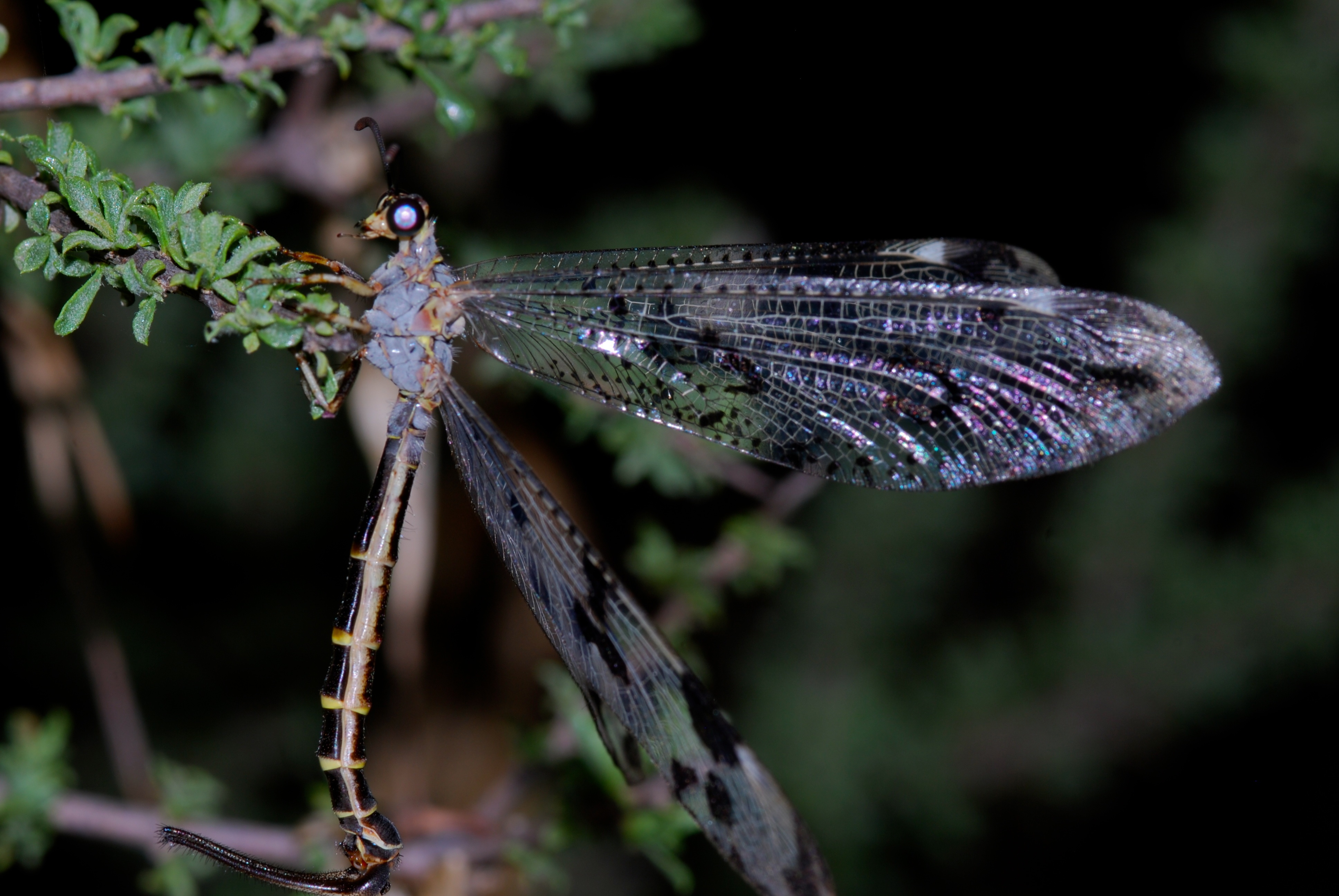

Scientific classification
- Domain: Eukaryota
- Kingdom: Animalia
- Phylum: Arthropoda
- Class: Insecta
- Order: Neuroptera
- Family: Myrmeleontidae
- Subfamily: Palparinae
- Tribe: Palparidiini; Markl, 1954
- Genus: Palparidius; Péringuey, 1910

= Palparidius =

Genus of insects

Palparidius is a genus of antlions, and the sole member of the tribe Palparidiini.

== Species ==
Species include:

- Palparidius capicola Péringuey, 1910
- Palparidius concinnus Péringuey, 1910
- Palparidius fascipennis (Banks, 1911)
