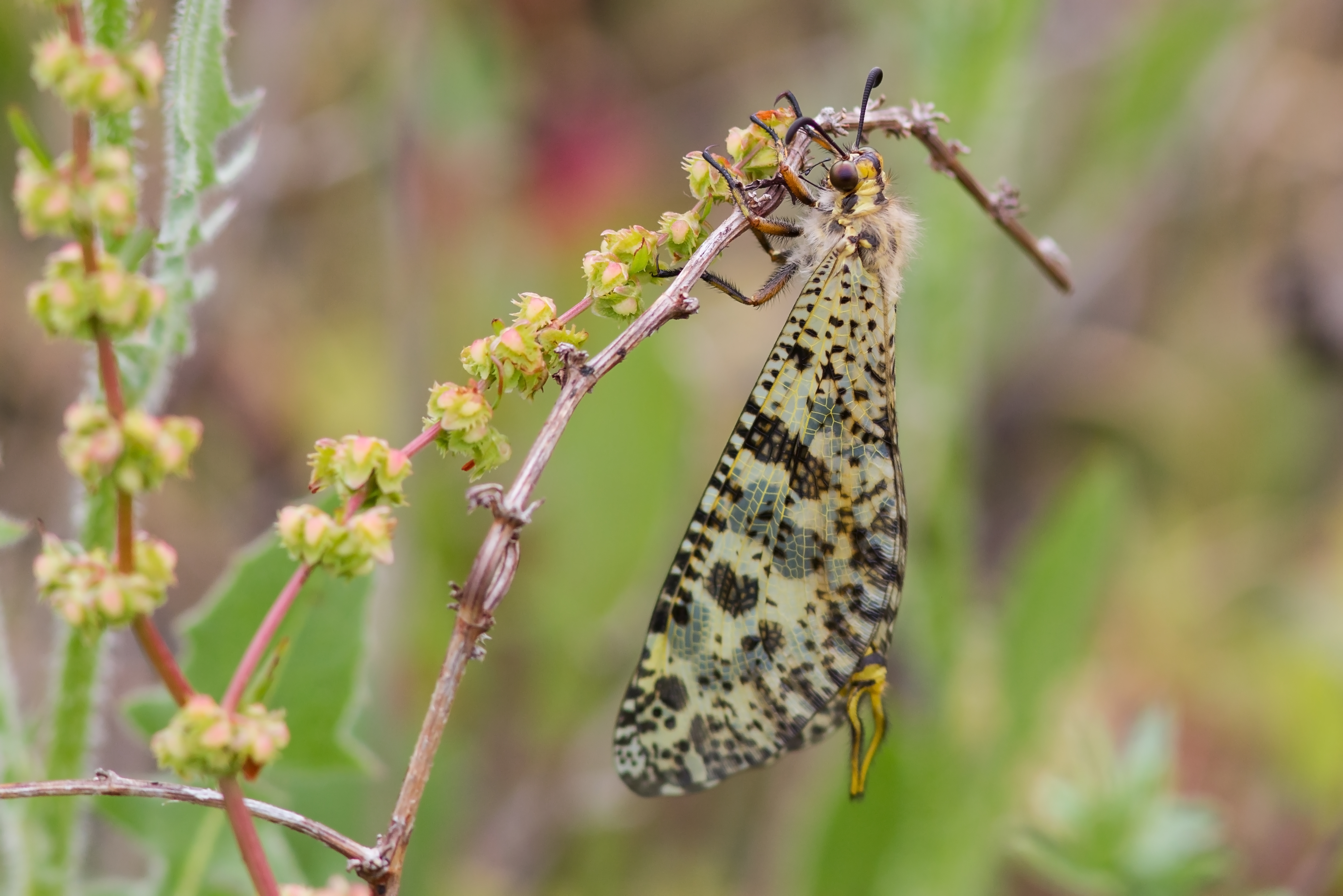
- Palpares libelluloides

Scientific classification
- Domain: Eukaryota
- Kingdom: Animalia
- Phylum: Arthropoda
- Class: Insecta
- Order: Neuroptera
- Family: Myrmeleontidae
- Subfamily: Palparinae

Tribes
- Dimarini; Maulini; Palparidiini; Palparini

Synonyms
- Araripeneurinae

= Palparinae =

Subfamily of insects

Palparinae is an antlion subfamily in the family Myrmeleontidae.
