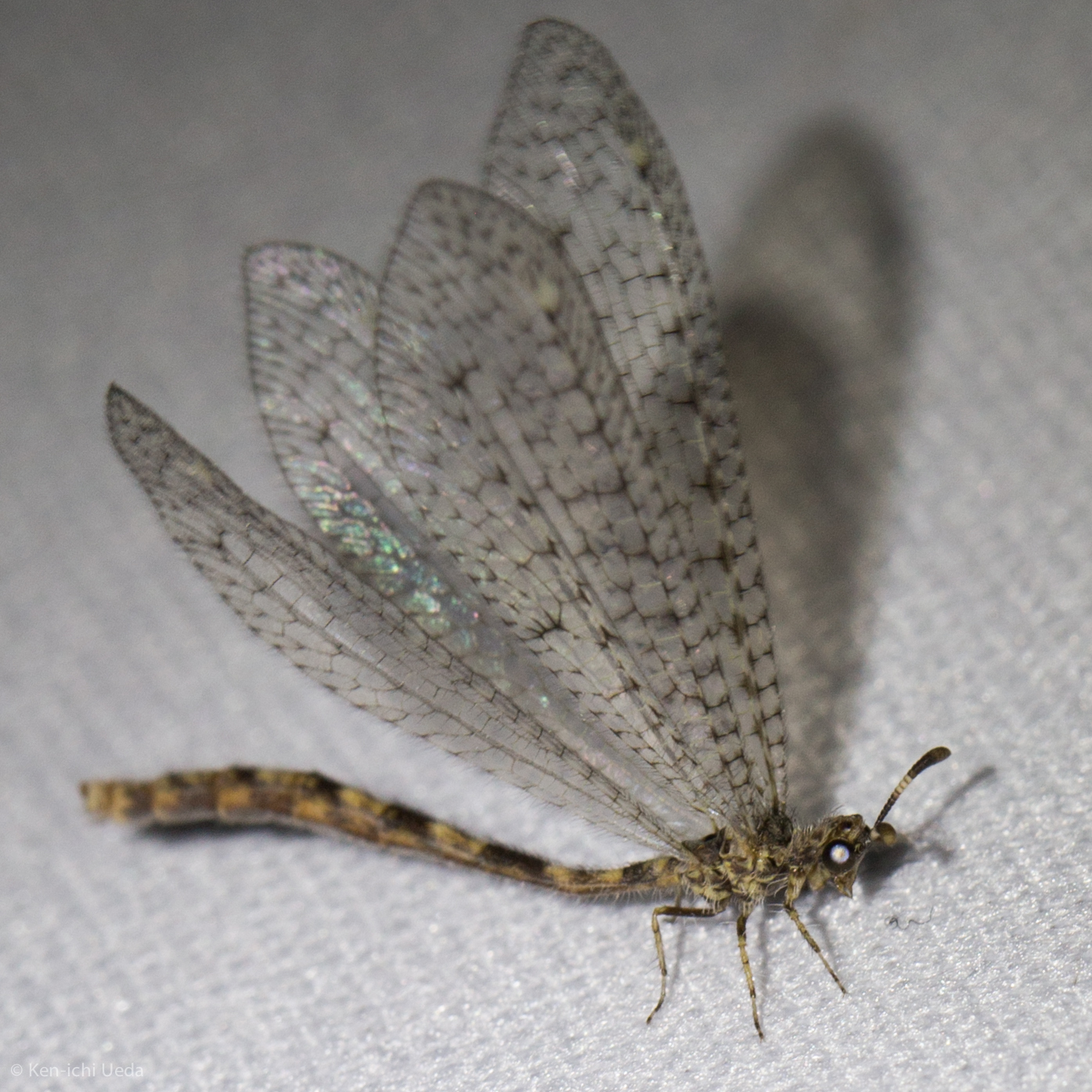

Scientific classification
- Domain: Eukaryota
- Kingdom: Animalia
- Phylum: Arthropoda
- Class: Insecta
- Order: Neuroptera
- Family: Myrmeleontidae
- Genus: Menkeleon; Stange, 1970
- Species: M. bellulus

Binomial name
- Menkeleon bellulus (Banks, 1905)

= Menkeleon =

Genus of insects

Menkeleon is a genus of antlions in the family Myrmeleontidae. There is one described species in Menkeleon, Menkeleon bellulus. It is found in the Western United States and Mexico.
