= Myrmecaelurini =

Scientific classification
- Domain: Eukaryota
- Kingdom: Animalia
- Phylum: Arthropoda
- Class: Insecta
- Order: Neuroptera
- Family: Myrmeleontidae
- Subfamily: Myrmeleontinae
- Tribe: Myrmecaelurini; Esben-Petersen, 1918

Genera
- 16 (see text)

Subfamily of insects

Myrmecaelurini is a tribe of antlion within the subfamily Myrmeleontinae.

== Genera ==
Thera are 16 genera of Myrmecaelurini comprising 157 species.

- Afghanoleon Hözel 1972
- Furgella Markl 1953
- Gepella Hözel 1968
- Gepus Navás 1912
- Holzezus Krivokhatsky 1992
- Iranoleon Hözel 1968
- Isoleon Esben-Petersen 1930
- Lopezus Navás 1913
- Maracanda McLachlan 1875
- Mongoleon Hözel 1970
- Myrmecaelurus Costa 1855
- Nannoleon Esben-Petersen 1928
- Naya Navás 1932
- Nophis Navás 1912
- Solter Navás 1912
- Subgulina Krivokhatsky 1996
