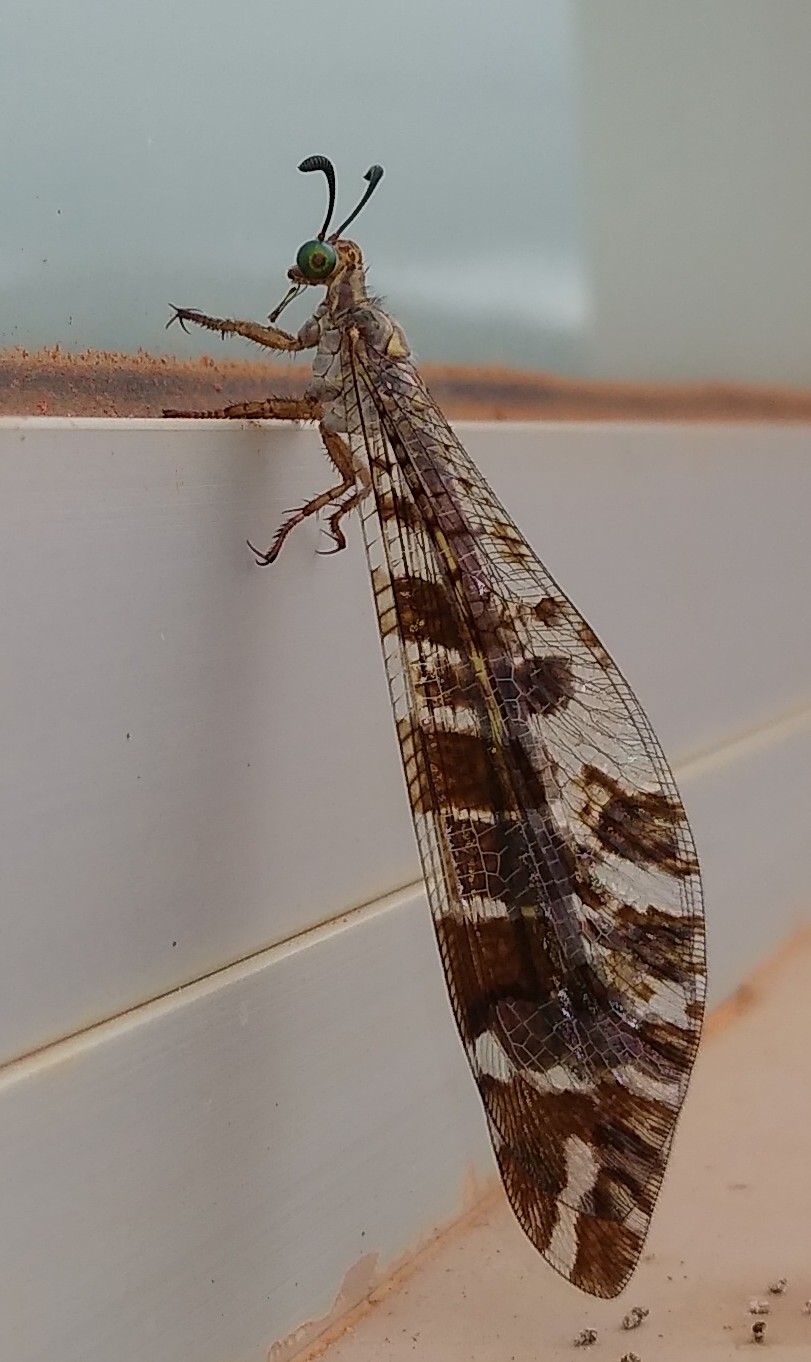
- Dimares elegans, Brazil

Scientific classification
- Kingdom: Animalia
- Phylum: Arthropoda
- Clade: Pancrustacea
- Class: Insecta
- Order: Neuroptera
- Family: Myrmeleontidae
- Subfamily: Palparinae
- Tribe: Dimarini; Navas, 1914

Genera
- Dimares; Millerleon

= Dimarini =

Tribe of insects

Dimarini is an antlion tribe in the family Myrmeleontidae.
