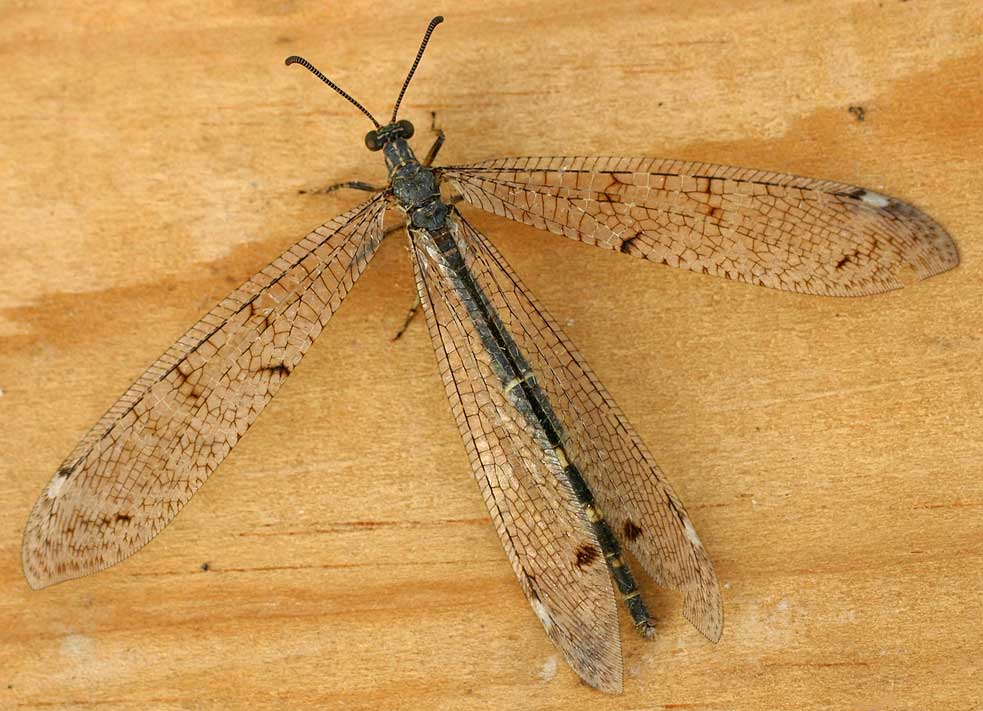
- Distoleon tetragrammicus
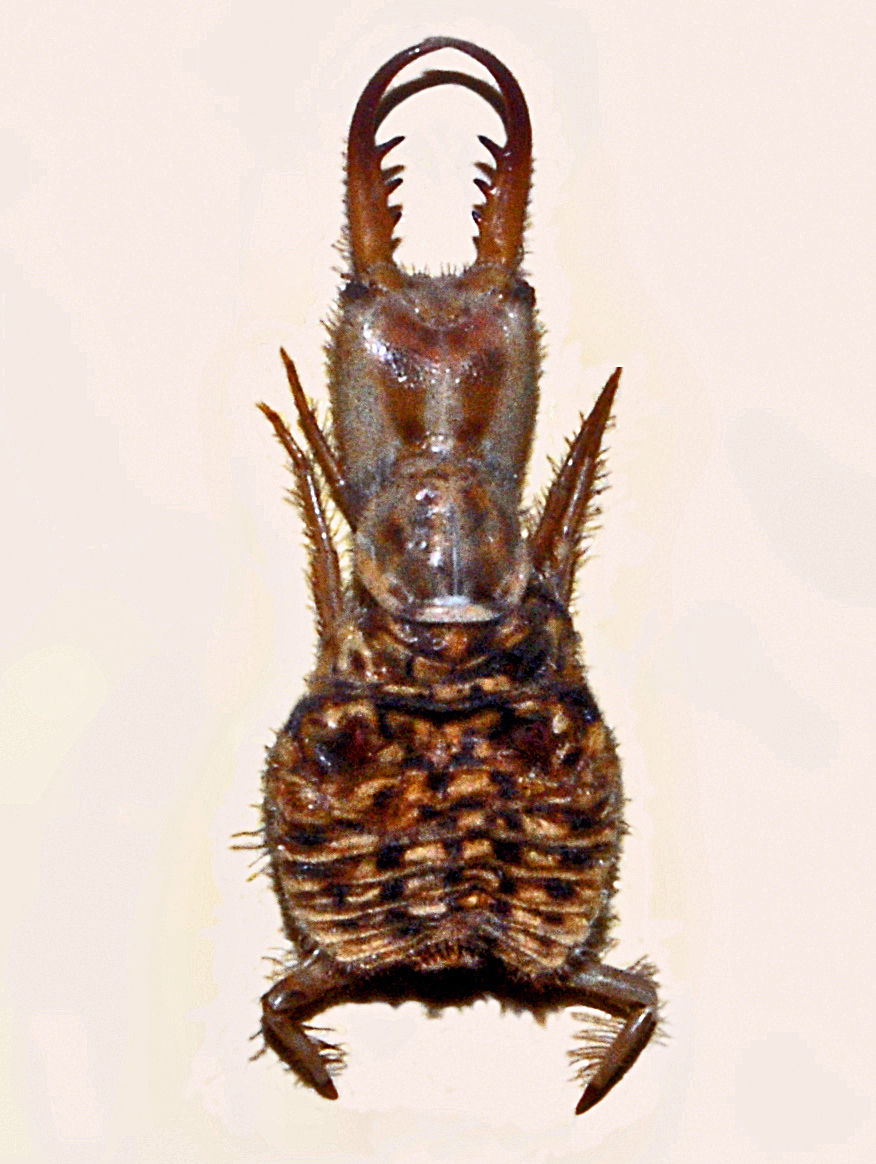
- Distoleon tetragrammicus larva

Scientific classification
- Kingdom: Animalia
- Phylum: Arthropoda
- Clade: Pancrustacea
- Class: Insecta
- Order: Neuroptera
- Superfamily: Myrmeleontoidea
- Family: Myrmeleontidae; Latreille, 1802

Subfamilies
- see text

= Antlion =

Antlions Temporal range: 122–0 Ma Early Cretaceous – Recent

Family of insects

The antlions are a group of about 2,000 species of insect in the neuropteran family Myrmeleontidae. They are known for the predatory habits of their larvae, which mostly dig pits to trap passing ants or other prey. In North America, the larvae are sometimes referred to as doodlebugs because of the marks they leave in the sand. The adult insects are less well known due to their relatively short lifespans in comparison with the larvae. Adults, sometimes known as antlion lacewings, mostly fly at dusk or just after dark and may be mistakenly identified as dragonflies or damselflies.

Antlions have a worldwide distribution. The greatest diversity occurs in the tropics, but a few species are found in cold-temperate locations, one such being the European Euroleon nostras. They most commonly occur in dry and sandy habitats where the larvae can easily excavate their pits, but some larvae hide under debris or ambush their prey among leaf litter.

Antlions are poorly represented in the fossil record. Myrmeleontiformia is generally accepted to be a monophyletic group, and within the Myrmeleontoidea, the antlions' closest living relatives are thought to be the owlflies (Ascalaphidae). A 2019 study finds Myrmeleontidae to be monophyletic, aside from Stilbopteryginae and Palparinae, which form separate clades closer to Ascalaphidae. The predatory actions of the larvae have attracted attention throughout history and antlions have been mentioned in literature since classical times.

== Etymology ==
The exact meaning of the name "antlion" is uncertain. It has been thought to refer to ants forming a large percentage of the prey of the insect, the suffix "lion" merely suggesting "destroyer" or "hunter". In any case, the term seems to go back to classical antiquity. The antlion larva is often called a "doodlebug" in North America because of the odd winding, spiralling trails it leaves in the sand while relocating, which look as if someone has been doodling.

The scientific name of the type genus Myrmeleon – and thus, the family as a whole – is presumably derived from Ancient Greek μύρμηξ (múrmex), meaning "ant" λέων (léon), meaning "lion", in a loan translation of the names common across Europe. In most European and Middle Eastern languages, at least the larvae are known under the local term corresponding to "antlion".

== Description ==
Antlions can be fairly small to very large neuropterans, with wingspans ranging from 2 to 15 cm (0.8 to 5.9 in). The African genus Palpares contains some of the largest examples. Acanthaclisis occitanica is the largest European species, with an 11 cm (4.3 in) wingspan, and most North American species approach this size.

The adult has two pairs of long, narrow, multiveined, translucent wings and a long, slender abdomen. Although they somewhat resemble dragonflies or damselflies, they belong to a different infraclass of winged insects. Antlion adults are easily distinguished from damselflies by their prominent, apically clubbed antennae which are about as long as the head and thorax combined. Also, the pattern of wing venation differs, and compared to damselflies, the adults are very feeble fliers and are normally found fluttering about at night in search of a mate. Adult antlions are typically nocturnal, and rarely seen by day.

Males of most species have a unique structure, a bristle-bearing knob known as a "pilula axillaris", at the base of the rear wing. The abdomen in males is usually longer than in females and often has an extra lobe. The tip of the abdomen of females shows greater variation than that of males, depending perhaps on oviposition sites, and usually bears tufts of bristles for digging and a finger-like extension.

The antlion larva has a robust fusiform body, a very plump abdomen, and a thorax bearing three pairs of walking legs. The prothorax forms a slender mobile "neck" for the large, square, flattened head, which bears an enormous pair of sickle-like jaws with several sharp, hollow projections. The jaws are formed by the maxillae and mandibles; the mandibles each contain a deep groove over which the maxilla fits neatly, forming an enclosed canal for injecting venom to immobilise the victim, and enzymes to digest its soft parts. The larva is clad in forward-pointing bristles which help it to anchor itself and exert greater traction, enabling it to subdue prey considerably larger than itself.

Antlion larvae are unusual among insects in lacking an anus. All the metabolic waste generated during the larval stage is stored; some is used to spin the silk for the cocoon and the rest is eventually voided as meconium at the end of its pupal stage.

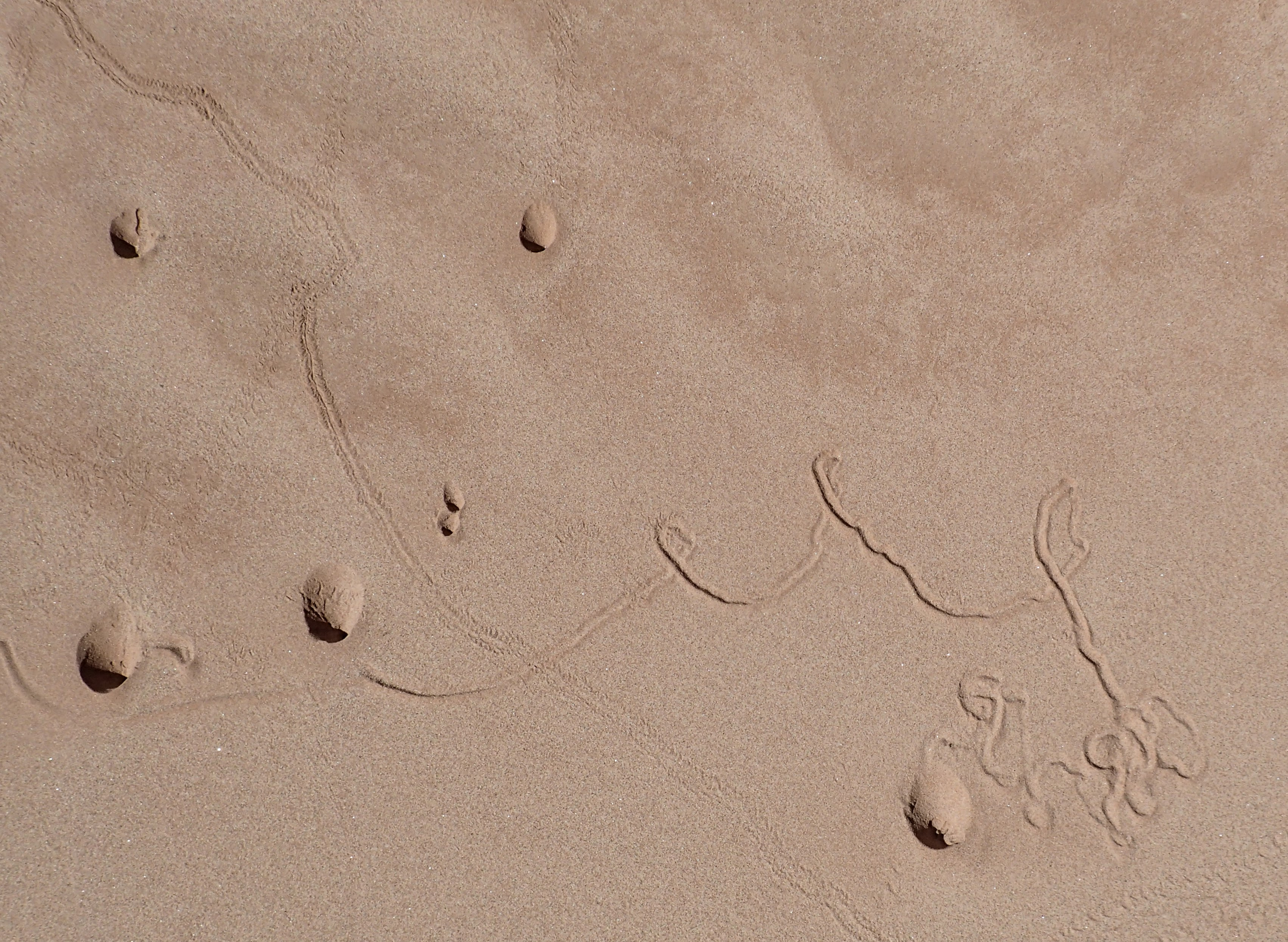
Doodlebug (antlion) doodles and pit traps in the Grand Canyon

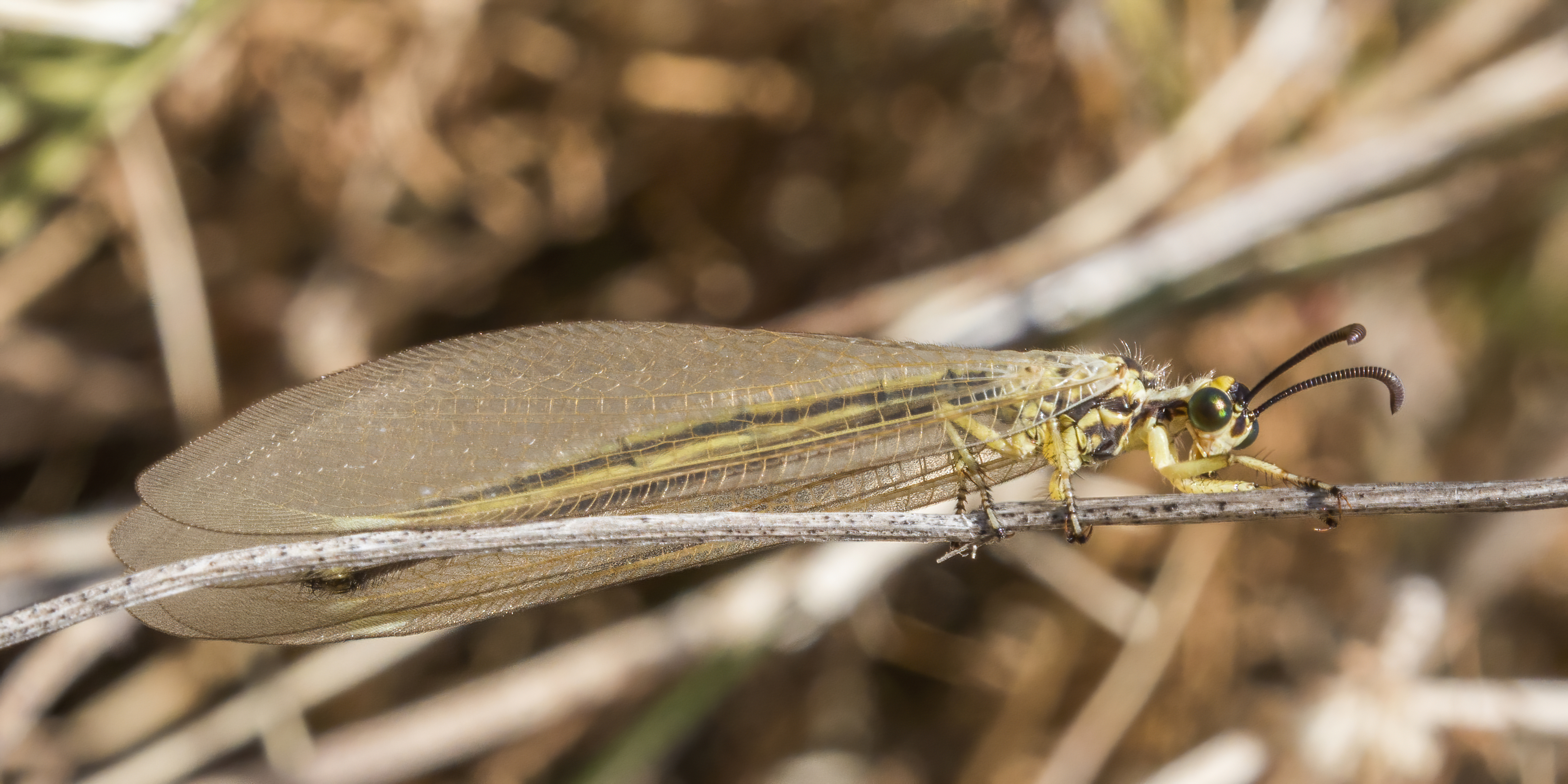
Adult of Myrmecaelurus trigammus

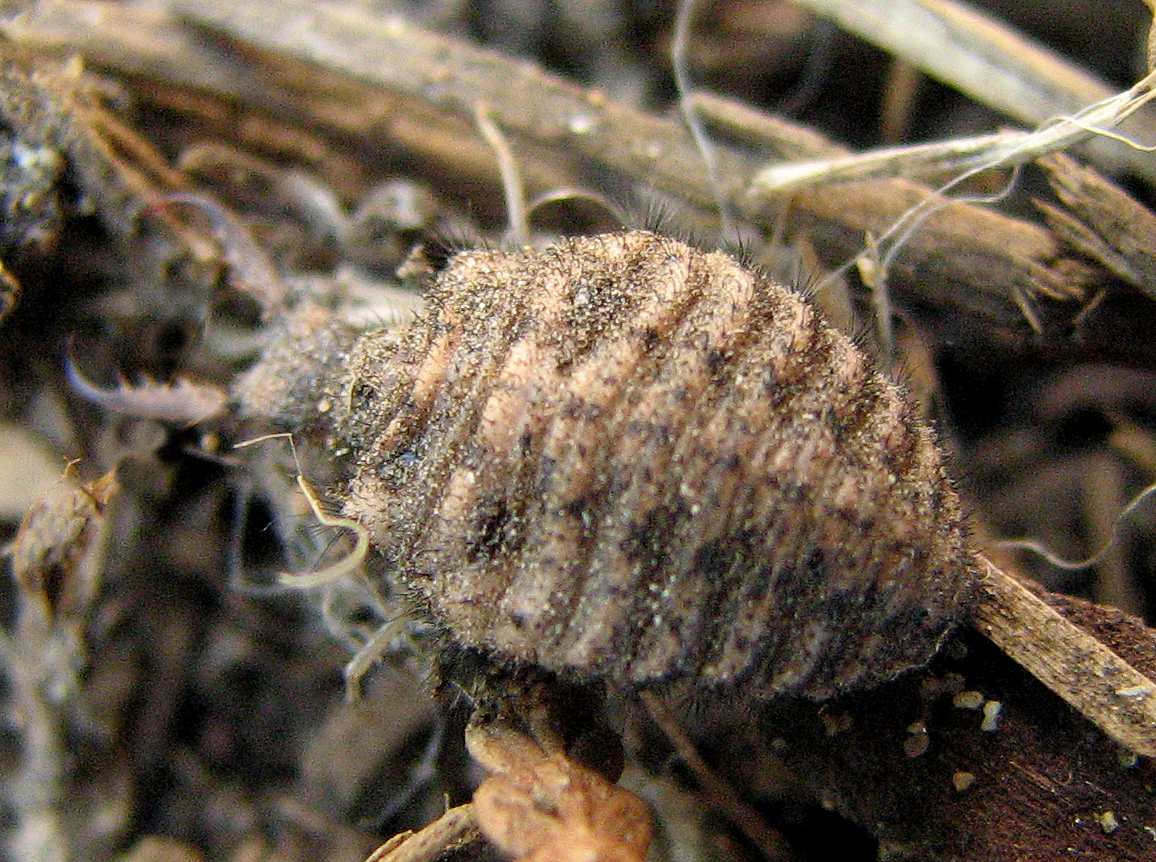
Larva of Myrmeleon immaculatus

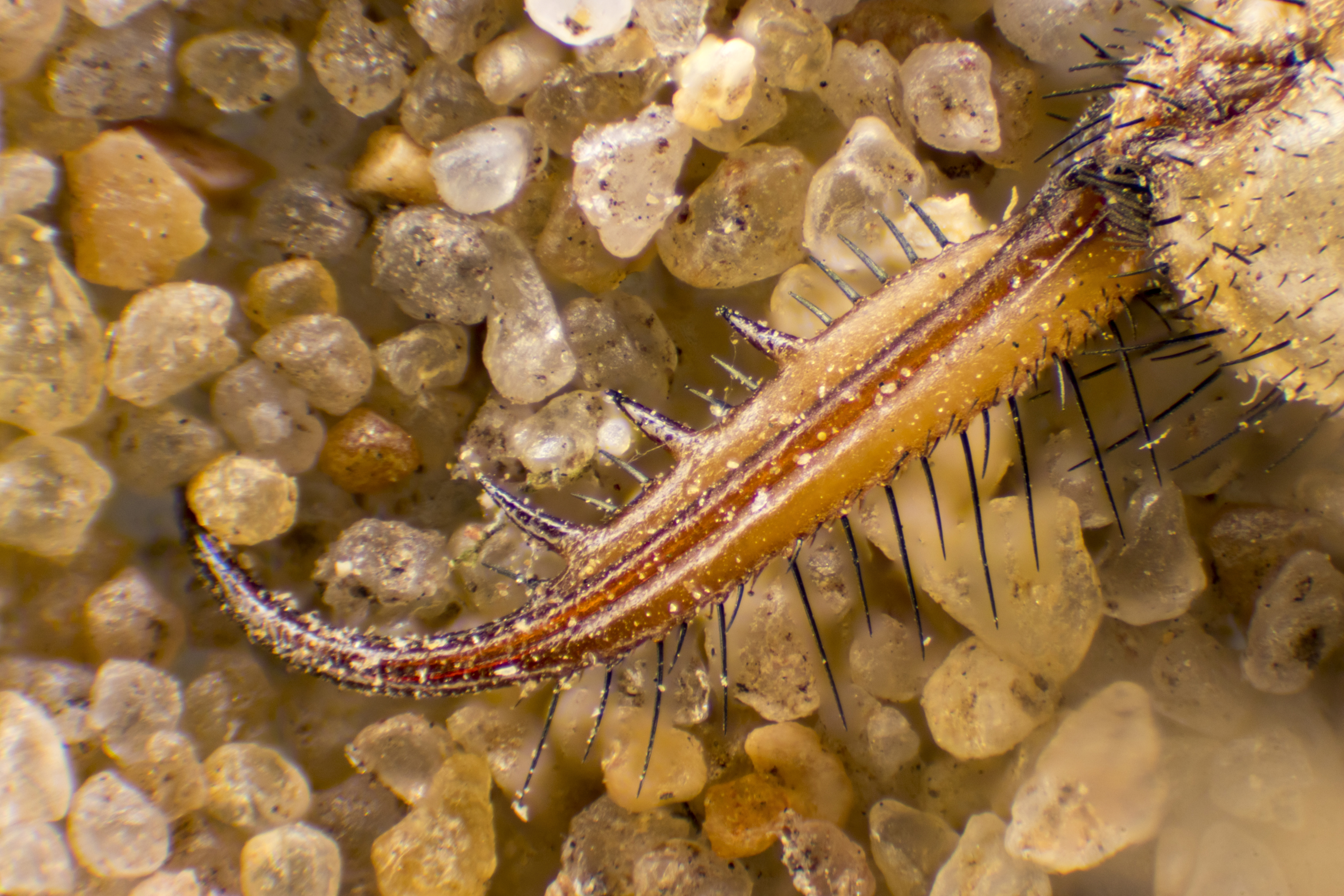
The bottom side of larval mandible with a visible maxilla for injecting venom

== Distribution ==
There are about 2,000 species of antlion found in most parts of the world, with the greatest diversity being in warmer areas. The best known species are those in which the larvae dig pits to trap their prey, but not all species do this. Antlions live in a range of usually dry habitats including open woodland floors, scrub-clad dunes, hedge bases, river banks, road verges, under raised buildings and in vacant lots.

== Life-cycle ==
The life-cycle of Distoleon tetragrammicus

Apart from pit-trap-forming taxa, the biology of members of the family Myrmeleontidae, to which the antlions belong, has been little studied. The life-cycle begins with oviposition (egg-laying) in a suitable location. The female antlion repeatedly taps the prospective laying site with the tip of her abdomen and then inserts her ovipositor into the substrate and lays an egg.

Depending on the species and where it lives, the larva either conceals itself under leaves, debris or pieces of wood, hides in a crack or digs a funnel-shaped pit in loose material. As ambush predators, catching prey is risky because food arrives unpredictably and, for those species that make traps, maintaining one is costly. The larvae therefore have low metabolic rates and can survive for long periods without food. They can take several years to complete their life-cycle; they mature faster with plentiful food, but can survive for many months without feeding. In cooler climates they dig their way deeper and remain inactive during the winter.

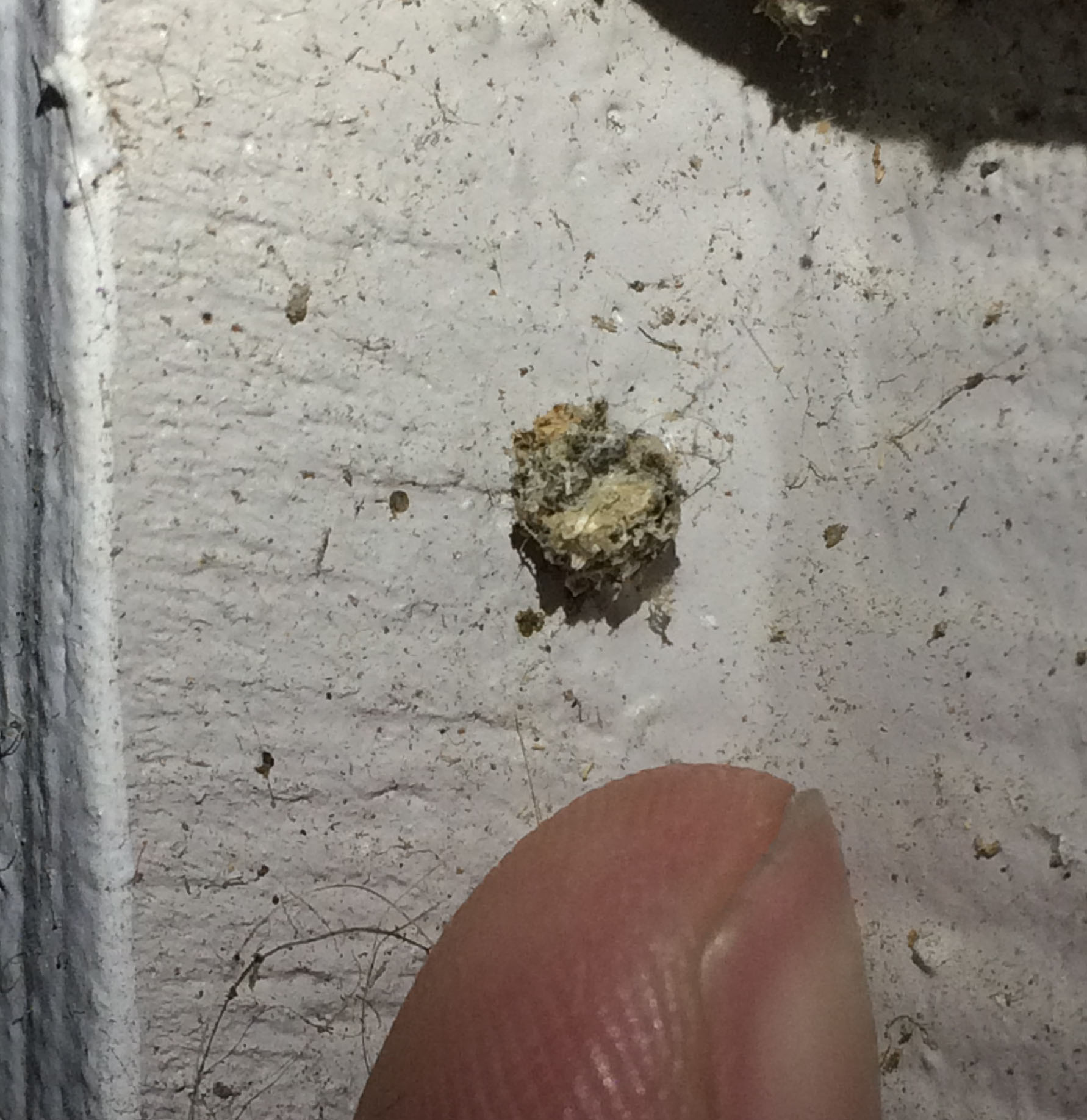
An antlion cocoon on the side of a house

When the larva attains its maximum size, it pupates and undergoes metamorphosis. It makes a globular cocoon of sand or other local substrate stuck together with fine silk spun from a slender spinneret at the rear end of the body. The cocoon may be buried several centimetres deep in sand. After completing its transformation into an adult insect over the course of about one month, it emerges from the case, leaving the pupal integument behind, and works its way to the surface. After about twenty minutes, the adult's wings are fully opened and it flies off in search of a mate. The adult is considerably larger than the larva as antlions exhibit the greatest disparity in size between larva and adult of any type of holometabolous insect. This is by virtue of the fact that the exoskeleton of the adult is extremely thin and flimsy, with an exceptionally low density. The adult typically lives for about 25 days, but some insects survive for as long as 45 days.

== Ecology ==
Antlion larvae eat small arthropods – mainly ants – while the adults of some species eat pollen and nectar, and others are predators of small arthropods. In certain species of Myrmeleontidae, such as Dendroleon pantherinus, the larva, although resembling that of Myrmeleon structurally, makes no pitfall trap, but hides in detritus in a hole in a tree and seizes passing prey. In Japan, Gatzara jezoensis larvae lurk on the surface of rocks for several years while awaiting prey; during this time they often become coated with lichen, and have been recorded at densities of up to 344 per square metre.

The larva is a voracious predator. Within a few minutes of seizing its prey with its jaws and injecting it with venom and enzymes, it begins to suck out the digestion products. The larva is extremely sensitive to ground vibrations, the low-frequency sounds made by an insect crawling across the ground; the larva locates the source of the vibrations by the differences in timing of the arrival of waves detected by receptors, tufts of hairs on the sides of the two hindmost thoracic segments.

=== Pit-building species ===
Funnel-shaped pits are built by members of just 3 antlion tribes: Myrmeleontini, Myrmecaelurini, and Nesoleontini. In these trap-building species, an average-sized larva digs a pit about 2 in (5 cm) deep and 3 in (7.5 cm) wide at the edge. This behavior has also been observed in the Vermileonidae (Diptera), whose larvae dig the same sort of pit to feed on ants. Having marked out the chosen site with a circular groove, the antlion larva begins to crawl backward, using its abdomen as a plough to dig up the soil. Using one of its front legs, it places heaps of loosened particles upon its head which it then flicks clear of the scene of operations. Continuing in this way, it gradually works its way from the circumference toward the center. As it slowly moves round and round, the pit gradually gets deeper and deeper, until the slope angle reaches the critical angle of repose (that is, the steepest angle the sand can maintain, where it is on the verge of collapse from slight disturbance), and the pit is solely lined by fine grains. By digging in a spiral when constructing its pit, the antlion minimises the time needed to complete the pit.

When the pit is completed, the larva settles down at the bottom, buried in the soil with only the jaws projecting above the surface, often in a wide-opened position on either side of the very tip of the cone. The steep-sloped trap that guides prey into the larva's mouth while avoiding crater avalanches is one of the simplest and most efficient traps in the animal kingdom. The fine grain lining ensures that the avalanches which carry prey are as large as possible. Since the sides of the pit consist of loose sand at its angle of repose, they afford an insecure foothold to any small insects that inadvertently venture over the edge, such as ants. Slipping to the bottom, the prey is immediately seized by the lurking antlion; if it attempts to scramble up the treacherous walls of the pit, it is speedily checked in its efforts and brought down by showers of loose sand which are thrown at it from below by the larva. By throwing up loose sand from the bottom of the pit, the larva also undermines the sides of the pit, causing them to collapse and bring the prey with them. Thus, it does not matter whether the larva actually strikes the prey with the sand showers.

Antlion larvae are capable of capturing and killing a variety of insects and other arthropods, and can even subdue small spiders. The projections in the jaws of the larva are hollow and through this, the larva sucks the fluids out of its victim. After the contents are consumed, the dry carcass is flicked out of the pit. The larva readies the pit once again by throwing out collapsed material from the center, steepening the pit walls to the angle of repose.

Antlion pit construction requires loose soil, sand being a common choice. Antlions can also handle larger granular material which is filtered out of the soil during construction. The larvae prefer dry places protected from the rain. When it first hatches, the tiny larva specialises in very small insects, but as it grows larger, it constructs larger pits, and thus catches larger prey, sometimes much larger than itself.

Other arthropods may make use of the antlion larva's ability to trap prey. The larva of the Australian horsefly (Scaptia muscula) lives in antlion (for example Myrmeleon pictifrons) pit traps and feeds on the prey caught, and the female chalcid wasp (Lasiochalcidia igiliensis) purposefully allows itself to be trapped so that it can parasitise the antlion larva by ovipositing between its head and thorax.

Antlion larvae often "play dead" (from a few minutes up to an hour) when disturbed to put off predators. The method is effective; it increased survival rates in patches that use it by 20%. Furthermore, they appear to have maximized its usefulness—further increasing the duration is not likely to convey substantial survival benefits to the larvae.

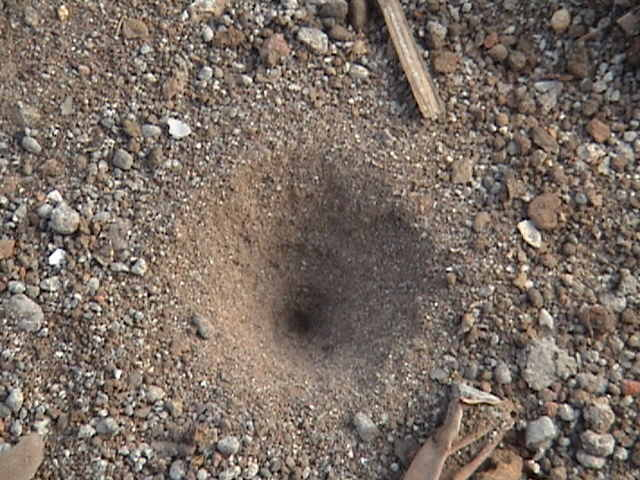
Sand pit trap

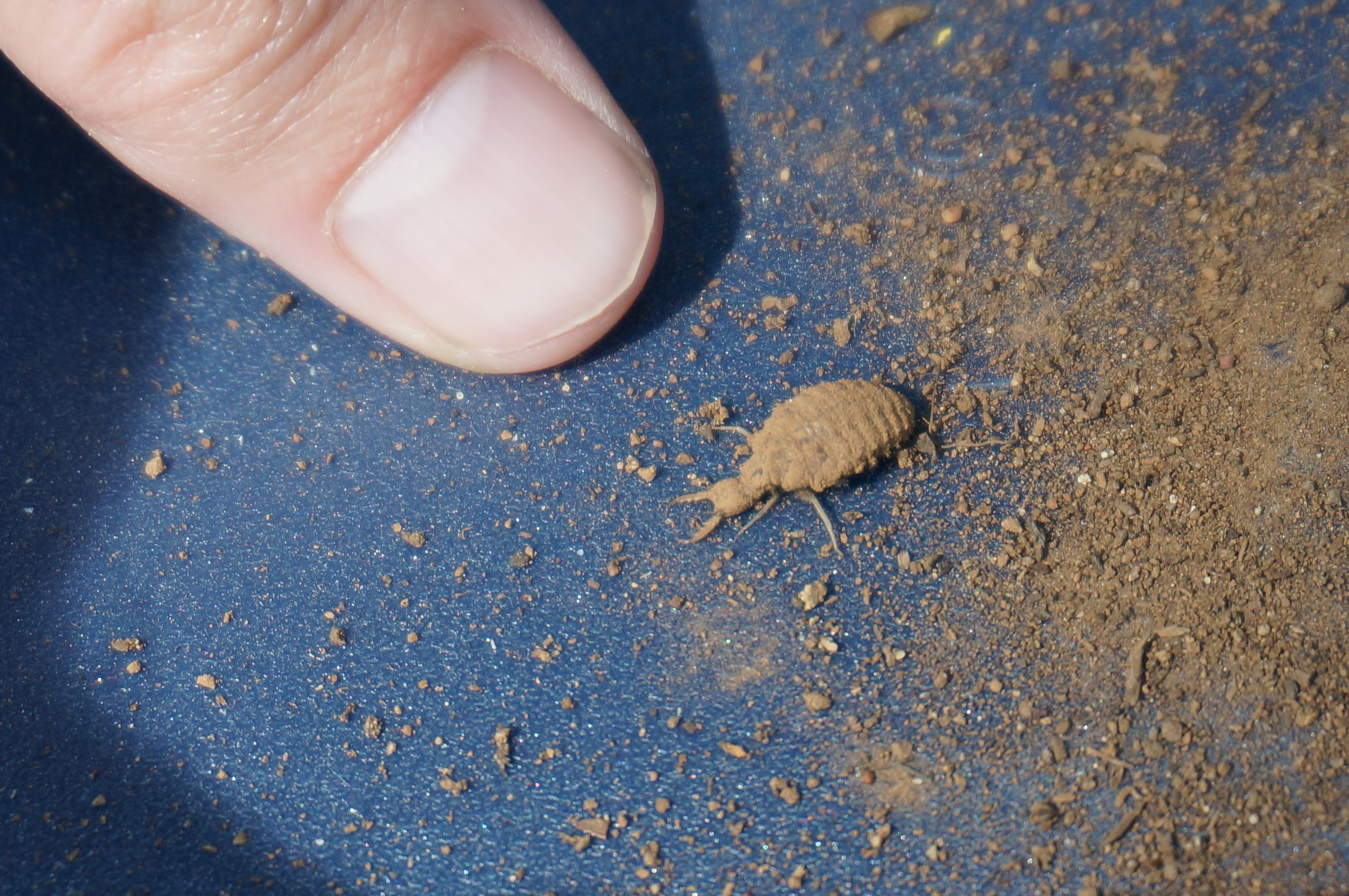
Larva extracted from sand pit

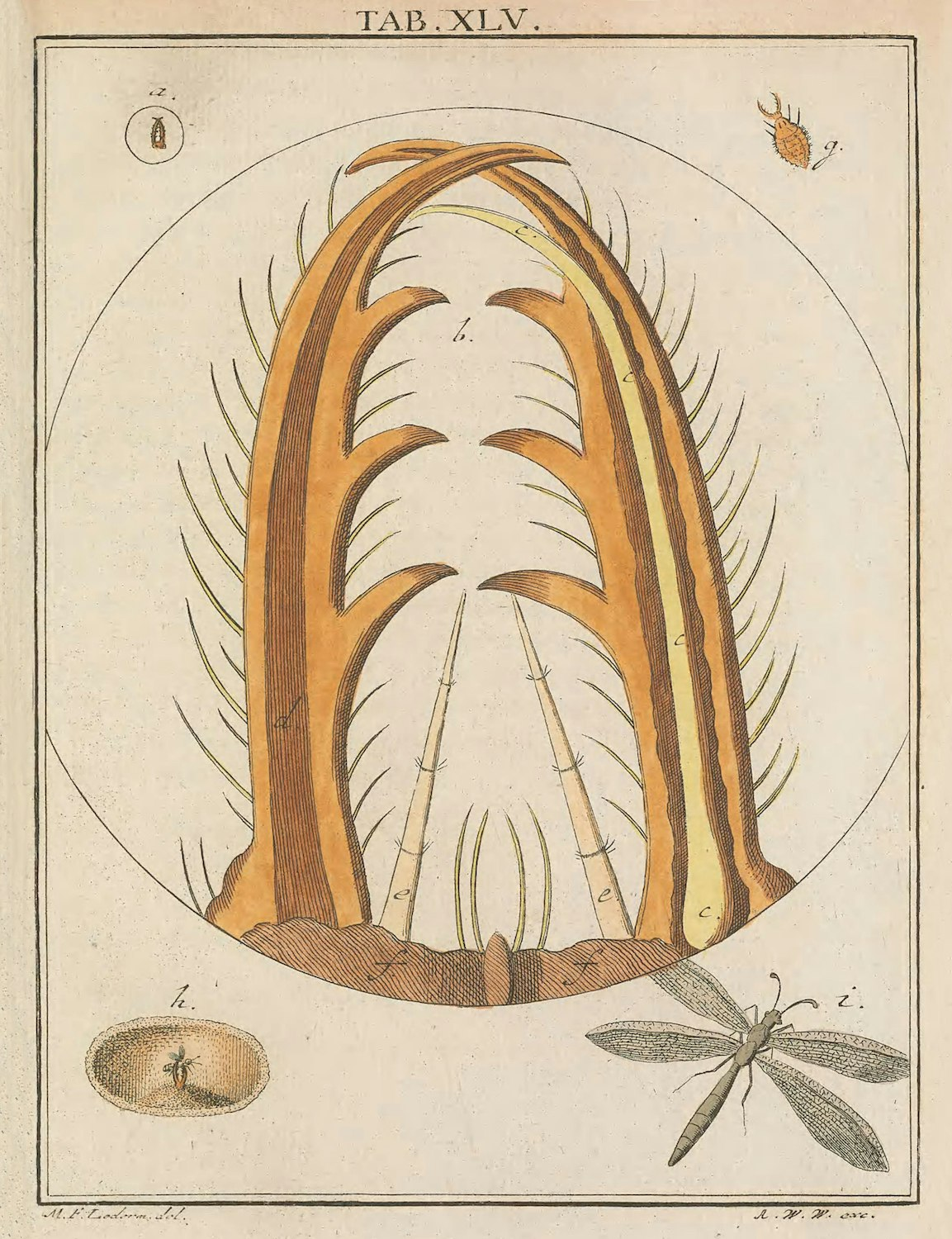
Microscopic illustration of an antlion larva's pincer by Martin Frobenius Ledermüller (1759–1763)

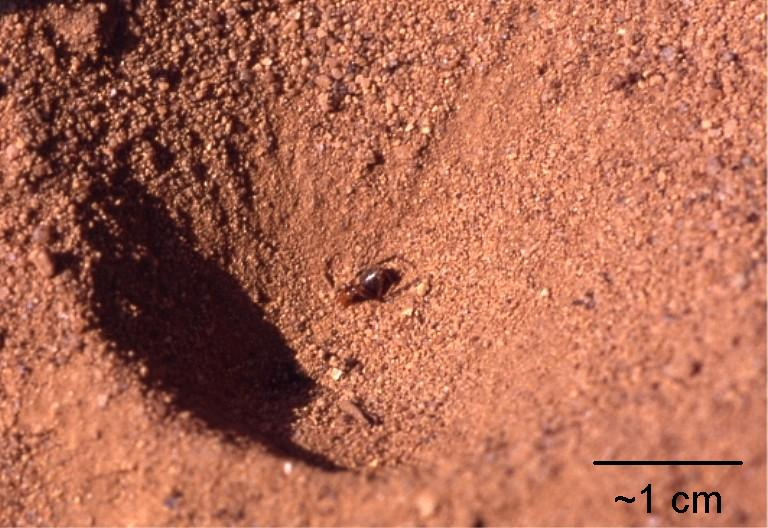
Sand pit trap with remains of an ant

== Evolution ==
The closest living relatives of antlions within the Myrmeleontoidea are the owlflies (Ascalaphidae); the Nymphidae are more distantly related. The extinct Araripeneuridae and Babinskaiidae are considered likely to be stem groups in the Myrmeleontiformia clade. The phylogeny of the Neuroptera has been explored using mitochondrial DNA sequences, and while issues remain for the group as a whole (the "Hemerobiiformia" being paraphyletic), the Myrmeleontiformia is generally agreed to be monophyletic, giving the following cladogram:

- Neuroptera
  - Osmylidae (formerly in "Hemerobiiformia")
  - - Most of former "Hemerobiiformia"
      - Mantispidae (mantidflies)
      - - Ithonidae (moth lacewings)
        - Chrysopidae (green lacewings)
    - Myrmeleontiformia
      - Nymphidae (split-footed lacewings)
      - - Myrmeleontidae (antlions)
        - Ascalaphidae (owlflies)

The subfamilies are shown below; a few genera, mostly fossil, are of uncertain or basal position. The fossil record of antlions is very small by neuropteran standards. However, some Mesozoic fossils attest to the antlions' origin more than 150 million years ago. These were at one time separated as the Palaeoleontidae, but are now usually recognized as early antlions.

== Taxonomy ==
The supra-generic classification within the Myrmeleontidae is disputed by different authors. Several different schematics have been proposed.

=== Stange (2004) classification ===
Stange recognized three subfamilies, consisting of Stilbopteryginae, Palparinae, and Myrmeleontinae. Brachynemurinae, Dendroleontinae, and other subfamilies recognized by prior authors were placed in the Myrmeleontinae.

- Stilbopteryginae Newman, 1853
1. Stilbopterygini Newman, 1853 [then monotypic, later two genera]
- Palparinae Banks, 1911
1. Dimarini Navas, 1914
2. Palparidiini Markl, 1954
3. Palparini Banks, 1911
4. Pseudimarini Markl 1954
- Myrmeleontinae Latreille, 1802
1. Acanthaclisini Navas, 1912
2. Brachynemurini Banks, 1927
3. Dendroleontini Banks, 1899
4. Gnopholeontini Stange, 1994
5. Lemolemini Stange, 1994
6. Maulini Markl 1954
7. Myrmecaelurini Esben-Petersen, 1918
8. Myrmeleontini Latreille, 1802
9. Nesoleontini Markl, 1954
10. Nemoleontini Banks, 1911

=== Michel et al. (2017) classification ===
Michel et.al recognized just four subfamilies, consisting of Acanthaclisinae, Myrmeleontinae, Palparinae, and Stilbopteryginae.

- Stilbopteryginae Newman, 1853
1. Stilbopterygini Newman, 1853
- Acanthaclisinae Navas, 1912
1. Acanthaclisini Navas, 1912
- Palparinae Banks, 1911
1. Dimarini Navas, 1914
2. Palparidiini Markl, 1954
3. Palparini Banks, 1911
4. Pseudimarini Markl 1954
- Myrmeleontinae Latreille, 1802
1. Brachynemurini Banks, 1927
2. Dendroleontini Banks, 1899
3. Gepini Markl, 1954
4. Gnopholeontini Stange, 1994
5. Lemolemini Stange, 1994
6. Maulini Markl 1954
7. Myrmecaelurini Esben-Petersen, 1918
8. Myrmeleontini Latreille, 1802
9. Nesoleontini Markl, 1954

=== Machado et al. (2018) classification ===
A subsequent revision by Machado et.al recognized a different four subfamilies, notable in the inclusion of the family Ascalaphidae as a subfamily instead of as a sister taxon to Myrmeleontidae: Ascalaphinae, Myrmeleontinae, Dendroleontinae, and Nemoleontinae.

- Ascalaphinae Rambur, 1842
1. Ascalaphini Lefèbvre, 1842
2. Dimarini Navas, 1914
3. Haplogleniini Newman, 1853
4. Palparini Banks, 1911
5. Stilbopterygini Newman, 1853
6. Ululodini Van der Weele 1909
- Myrmeleontinae Latreille, 1802
1. Acanthaclisini Navas, 1912
2. Brachynemurini Banks, 1927
3. Myrmecaelurini Esben-Petersen, 1918
4. Myrmeleontini Latreille, 1802
5. Nesoleontini Markl, 1954
- Dendroleontinae Banks, 1899
1. Acanthoplectrini Markl, 1954
2. Dendroleontini Banks, 1899
3. Glenurini Banks, 1927
4. Megistopini Navas, 1912
- Nemoleontinae Banks, 1911
1. Nemoleontini Banks, 1911
2. Protoplectrini Tillyard, 1916

=== Jones (2019) classification ===
Jones dissented with Machado et al. and presented an alternative classification, restoring the Ascalaphidae to its traditional family-rank placement, and elevating Palparinae and Stilbopteryginae to family level, leaving only a single subfamily in Myrmeleontidae sensu stricto. However, this classification has been rejected by Hévin et al. (2023), finding the taxonomic decisions to be "not substantiated, with only the family name Palparidae being mentioned in isolation."

- Myrmeleontinae Latreille, 1802
1. Acanthaclisini Navas, 1912
2. Brachynemurini Banks, 1927
3. Dendroleontini Banks, 1899
4. Myrmecaelurini Esben-Petersen, 1918
5. Myrmeleontini Latreille, 1802
6. Nemoleontini Banks, 1911
7. Nesoleontini Markl, 1954
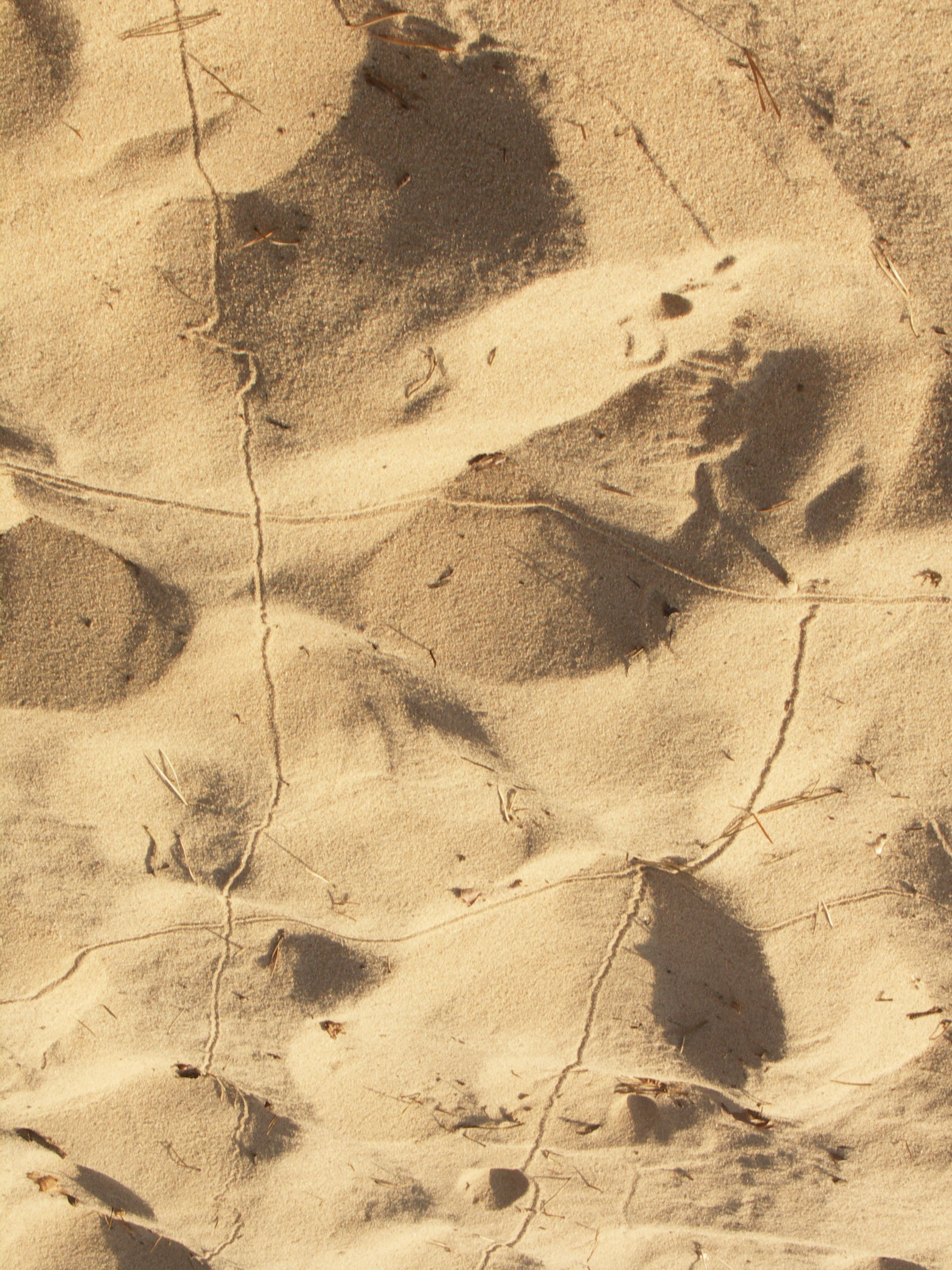
Antlion larva trails (doodles) in sand

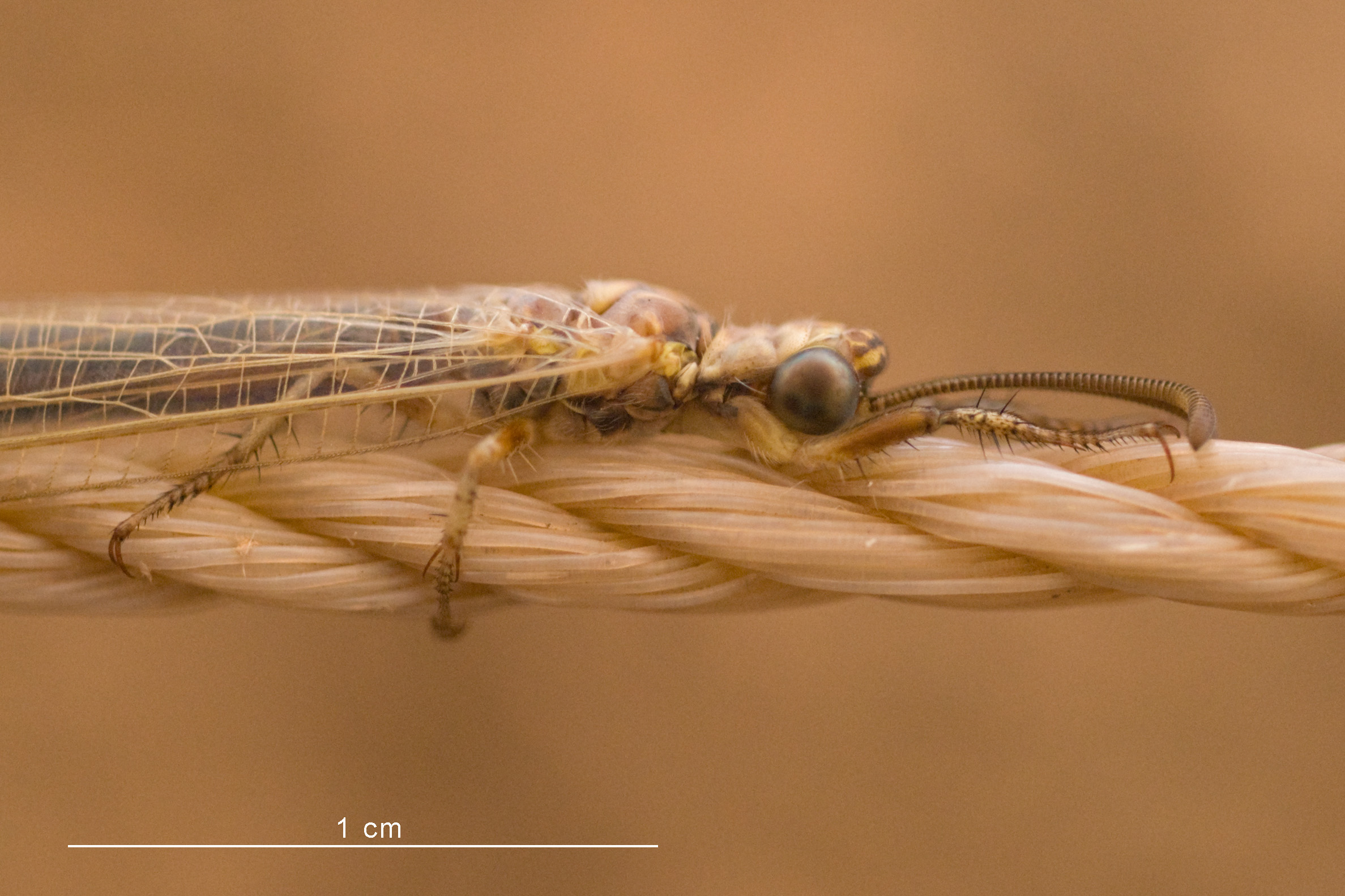
Thorax and head (with club-shaped antenna) of antlion adult

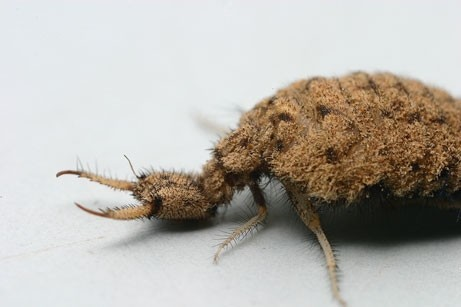
Larva

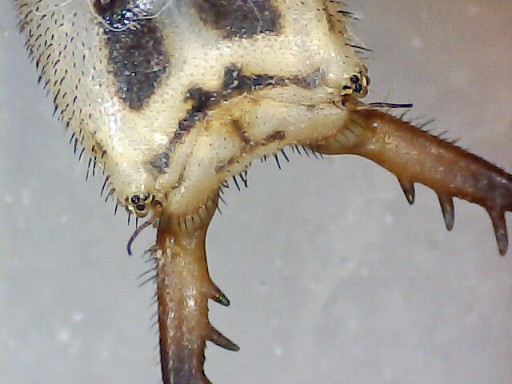
20x closeup of larva

Video of antlion larva trying to catch prey with sand traps and eating a small spider

Video of a larva trapping an ant by throwing sand at it

== In culture and folklore ==
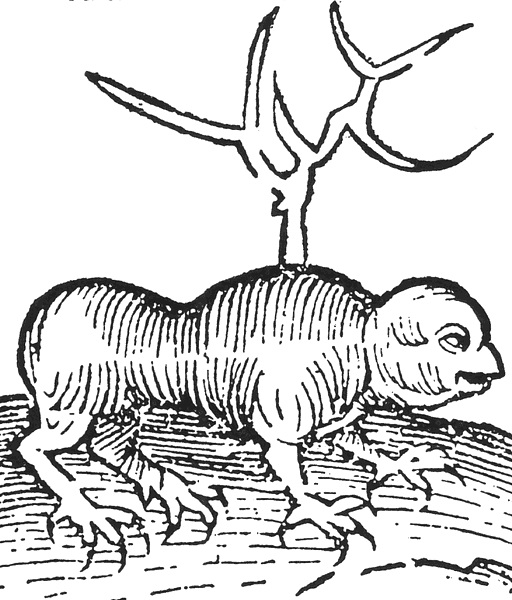
Myrmecoleon, from the Hortus Sanitatis of Jacob Meydenbach, 1491

In popular folklore in the southern United States, people recite a poem or chant to make the antlion come out of its hole. Similar practices have been recorded from Africa, the Caribbean, China and Australia.

The Myrmecoleon was a mythical ant–lion hybrid written about in the 2nd century AD Physiologus, where animal descriptions were paired with Christian morals. The ant-lion as described was said to starve to death because of its dual nature – the lion nature of the father could only eat meat, but the ant half from the mother could only eat grain chaff, thus the offspring could not eat either and would starve. It was paired with the Biblical verse Matthew 5:37. The fictional ant-lion of Physiologus is probably derived from a misreading of Job 4:11. (Note: The verse runs "The old lion perisheth for lack of prey, and the stout lion's whelps are scattered abroad." (Authorised Version))

The French naturalist Jean-Henri Fabre wrote that "The Ant-lion makes a slanting funnel in the sand. Its victim, the Ant, slides down the slant and is then stoned, from the bottom of the funnel, by the hunter, who turns his neck into a catapult."

In Japan, both the insect and its pit-traps are popularly known as Arijigoku (蟻地獄; lit. "Ant Hell"). This term has since become a stock colloquialism for any "inescapable" trap, whether literal or metaphorical (e.g. an unpleasant social obligation).

Antlions appear as antagonists in the 1991 life simulation video game, SimAnt, and (in a giant form) in the Final Fantasy series, Grounded, Terraria, Don't Starve Together, Peak, Monster Rancher 2, Mother 3 and in the Half-Life 2 video game series as an unrelated alien insect species sharing sand burrowing traits with the real antlion larvae. The Trapinch, Vibrava, and Flygon Pokémon evolution line is based on an antlion. The fictional sarlacc from the Star Wars franchise is often compared to the real-life antlion. It also appears as a predator in the film Enemy Mine.

In the third book of Tove Jansson's Moomins series, Finn Family Moomintroll, a rather large and fanciful antlion appears in the second chapter, depicted as a sand-dwelling predator with the literal head of a lion.

== See also ==
- List of Myrmeleontidae genera
- Vermileonidae - wormlions
