= List of Myrmeleontidae genera =

This is a list of genera in the family Myrmeleontidae, antlions.

== Extant Myrmeleontidae genera ==
- Abatoleon Banks, 1924^{i c g}
- Acanthaclisis Rambur, 1842^{i c g}
- Acanthoplectron Esben-Petersen, 1918^{a i c g}
- Acratoleon Banks, 1915^{i c g}
- Aeropteryx Riek, 1968^{a i c g}
- Afghanoleon Hölzel, 1972^{i c g}
- Ameromyia Banks, 1913^{i c g}
- Annulares ^{c g}
- Anomaloplectron Esben-Petersen, 1918^{a i c g}
- Antennoleon New, 1985^{a i c g}
- Araucaleon Banks, 1938^{i c g}
- Arcuaplectron New, 1985^{a i c g}
- Argentoleon Stange, 1994^{i c g}
- Atricholeon Stange, 1994^{i c g}
- Australeon Miller and Stange, 2012^{a i c g}
- Austrogymnocnemia Esben-Petersen, 1917^{a i c g}
- Austroleon Banks, 1909^{i c g}
- Baliga Navás, 1912^{i c g}
- Bandidus Navás, 1914^{a i c g}
- Bankisus Navás, 1912^{i c g}
- Banyutus Navás, 1912^{i c g}
- Brachyleon Tillyard, 1916^{a i c g}
- Brachynemurus Hagen, 1888^{i c g b}
- Brachyplectron Esben-Petersen, 1925^{i c g}
- Brasileon Miller and Stange, 1989^{i c g}
- Brisus Navás, 1931^{i c g}
- Bullanga Navás, 1917^{i c g}
- Callistoleon Banks, 1910^{a i}
- Capicua Navás, 1921^{i c g}
- Capophanes Banks, 1938^{i c g}
- Centroclisis Navás, 1909^{i c g}
- Ceratoleon Esben-Petersen, 1917^{a i c g}
- Chaetoleon Banks, 1920^{i c g b}
- Chrysoleon Banks, 1910^{a i c g}
- Clathroneuria Banks, 1913^{i c g b}
- Compsoleon Banks, 1913^{a i c g}
- Cosina Navás, 1912^{a i c g}
- Crambomorphus McLachlan, 1867^{i c g}
- Creoleon Tillyard, 1918^{i c g}
- Csiroleon New, 1985^{a i c g}
- Cuca Navás, 1923^{i c g}
- Cueta Navás, 1911^{i c g}
- Cymatala C.-k. Yang, 1986^{i c g}
- Cymothales Gerstaecker, 1893^{i c g}
- Dejuna Navás, 1924^{i c g}
- Dejunaleon Miller and Stange, 2017^{c g}
- Delfimeus Navás, 1912^{i c g}
- Delgadus Navás, 1914^{i c g}
- Dendroleon Brauer, 1866^{a i c g b}
- Deutoleon Navás, 1927^{i c g}
- Dictyoleon Esben-Petersen, 1923^{i c g}
- Dimarella Banks, 1913^{i c g}
- Dimares Hagen, 1866^{i c g}
- Distoleon Banks, 1910^{a i c g}
- Distonemurus Krivokhatsky, 1992^{i c g}
- Distoplectron Banks, 1943^{a i c g}
- Doblina Navás, 1927^{i c g}
- Echthromyrmex McLachlan, 1867^{i c g}
- Ecualeon Stange, 1994^{i c g}
- Elachyleon Esben-Petersen, 1927^{i c g}
- Elicura Navás, 1911^{i c g}
- Enrera Navás, 1915^{i c g}
- Ensorra Navás, 1915^{i c g}
- Eophanes Banks, 1931^{a i c g}
- Epacanthaclisis Okamoto, 1910^{i c g}
- Epignopholeon Makarkin, 2017^{g}
- Episalus Gerstaecker, 1885^{i c g}
- Eremoleon Banks, 1901^{i c g}
- Escura Navás, 1914^{a i c g}
- Euptilon Westwood, 1837^{i c g b}
- Euroleon Esben-Petersen, 1918^{i c g}
- Exaetoleon Kimmins, 1948^{i c g}
- Fadrina Navás, 1912^{i c g}
- Fenestroleon New, 1985^{a i c g}
- Franzenia Esben-Petersen, 1929^{a i c g}
- Froggattisca Esben-Petersen, 1915^{a i c g}
- Furgella Markl, 1953^{i c g}
- Fusoleon New, 1985^{a i c g}
- Galapagoleon Stange, 1994^{i c g}
- Ganguilus Navás, 1912^{i c g}
- Gatzara Navás, 1915^{i c g}
- Gepella Hölzel, 1968^{i c g}
- Gepus Navás, 1912^{i c g}
- Geyria Esben-Petersen, 1920^{i c g}
- Glenoleon Banks, 1913^{a i c g}
- Glenurus Hagen, 1866^{i c g b}
- Gnopholeon Stange, 1970^{i c g}
- Golafrus Navás, 1912^{i c g}
- Goniocercus Insom and Carfi, 1988^{i c g}
- Graonus Navás, 1922^{i c g}
- Gymnocnemia Schneider, 1845^{i c g}
- Gymnoleon Banks, 1911^{i c g}
- Hagenomyia Banks, 1911^{a i c g}
- Heoclisis Navás, 1923^{a i c g}
- Holzezus Krivokhatsky, 1992^{i c g}
- Indoclystus Banks, 1941^{i c g}
- Indoleon Banks, 1913^{i c g}
- Indopalpares Insom and Carfi, 1988^{i c g}
- Iranoleon Hölzel, 1968^{i c g}
- Isoleon Esben-Petersen, 1931^{i c g}
- Isonemurus Esben-Petersen, 1928^{i c g}
- Jaffuelia Navás, 1918^{i c g}
- Jaya Navás, 1912^{i c g}
- Kirghizoleon Krivokhatsky and Zakharenko, 1994^{i c g}
- Lachlathetes Navás, 1926^{i c g}
- Layahima Navás, 1912^{i c g}
- Lemolemus Navás, 1911^{i c g}
- Lopezus Navás, 1913^{i c g}
- Macronemurus Costa, 1855^{i c g}
- Madrastra Navás, 1912^{i c g}
- Maracanda McLachlan, 1875^{i c g}
- Maracandula Currie, 1901^{i c g}
- Maula Navás, 1912^{i c g}
- Megistoleon Navás, 1931^{i c g}
- Megistopus Rambur, 1842^{i c g}
- Menkeleon Stange, 1970^{i c g b}
- Mesonemurus Navás, 1920^{i c g}
- Mestressa Navás, 1914^{a i c g}
- Mexoleon Stange, 1994^{i c g b}
- Millerleon Stange, 1989^{i c g}
- Mjobergia Esben-Petersen, 1918^{a i c g}
- Mongoleon Hölzel, 1970^{i c g}
- Mossega Navás, 1914^{a i c g}
- Myrmecaelurus Costa, 1855^{i c g}
- Myrmeleon Linnaeus, 1767^{a i c g b}
- Nadus Navás, 1935^{i c g}
- Nannoleon Esben-Petersen, 1928^{i c g}
- Navasoleon Banks, 1943^{i c g}
- Naya Navás, 1932^{i c g}
- Nedroledon Navás, 1914^{i c g}
- Negrokus Navás, 1930^{i c g}
- Neguitus Navás, 1912^{i c g}
- Nelebrachys Navás, 1915^{i c g}
- Neleinus Navás, 1915^{i c g}
- Nemoleon Navás, 1909^{i c g}
- Nepsalus Navás, 1914^{i c g}
- Nesoleon Banks, 1909^{i c g}
- Neteja Navás, 1914^{i c g}
- Neulatus Navás, 1912^{i c g}
- Neuroleon Navás, 1909^{i c g}
- Newleon Miller and Stange, 2012^{a i c g}
- Noaleon Hölzel, 1972^{i c g}
- Nomes Navás, 1914^{i c g}
- Nophis Navás, 1912^{i c g}
- Nosa Navás, 1911^{i c g}
- Nuglerus Navás, 1912^{i c g}
- Obus Navás, 1912^{i c g}
- Omoleon Navás, 1936^{i c g}
- Palparellus Navás, 1912^{i c g}
- Palpares Rambur, 1842^{i c g}
- Palparidius Péringuey, 1910^{i c g}
- Pamares Mansell, 1990^{i c g}
- Pamexis Hagen, 1866^{i c g}
- Paraglenurus van der Weele, 1909^{i c g}
- Paranthaclisis Banks, 1907^{i c g b}
- Parapalpares Insom and Carfi, 1988^{i c g}
- Parvoleon New, 1985^{a i c g}
- Periclystus Gerstaecker, 1888^{a i c g}
- Peruveleon Miller & Stange, 2011^{i c g b}
- Phanoclisis Banks, 1913^{i c g}
- Phanoleon Banks, 1931^{i c g}
- Platyleon Esben-Petersen, 1923^{a i c g}
- Porrerus Navás, 1913^{i c g}
- Protoplectron Gerstaecker, 1885^{a i c g}
- Pseudimares Kimmins, 1933^{i c g}
- Pseudoformicaleo van der Weele, 1909^{a i c g}
- Pseudopalpares Insom and Carfi, 1988^{i c g}
- Purenleon Stange, 2002^{i c g b}
- Quinemurus Kimmins, 1943^{i c g}
- Riekoleon New, 1985^{a i c g}
- Ripalda Navás, 1915^{i c g}
- Rovira Navás, 1914^{i c g}
- Scotoleon Banks, 1913^{i c g b}
- Sericoleon Esben-Petersen, 1933^{i c g}
- Sical Navás, 1928^{i c g}
- Solter Navás, 1912^{i c g}
- Speleon Miller and Stange, 2012^{a i c g}
- Stangeleon Miller, 2008^{i c g}
- Stenares Hagen, 1866^{i c g}
- Stenogymnocnemia Esben-Petersen, 1923^{a i c g}
- Stenoleon Tillyard, 1916^{a i c g}
- Stilbopteryx Newman, 1838^{a i c g}
- Stiphroneura Gerstaecker, 1885^{i c g}
- Subgulina Krivokhatsky, 1996^{i c g}
- Suca Navás, 1921^{i c g}
- Synclisis Navás, 1919^{i c g}
- Syngenes Kolbe, 1897^{i c g}
- Talosus Navás, 1923
- Thaumatoleon Esben-Petersen, 1921^{i c g}
- Tomatarella Kimmins, 1952^{i c g}
- Tomatares Hagen, 1866^{i c g}
- Tricholeon Esben-Petersen, 1925^{i c g}
- Tyttholeon Adams, 1957^{i c g}
- Valignanus Navás, 1913^{i c g}
- Vella Navás, 1913^{i c g b}
- Vellassa Navás, 1924^{c g}
- Venezueleon Stange, 1994^{i c g}
- Visca Navás, 1927^{i c g}
- Voltor Navás, 1935^{i c g}
- Weeleus Navás, 1912^{i c g}
- Xantholeon Tillyard, 1916^{a i c g}

== Fossil Myrmeleontidae genera ==
- †Araripeneura ^{c g}
- †Bleyeria ^{c g}
- †Blittersdorffia ^{c g}
- †Burmaneura ^{c g}
- †Caldasia ^{c g}
- †Caririneura ^{c g}
- †Choromyrmeleon ^{c g}
- †Cratoalloneura ^{c g}
- †Cratoneura ^{c g}
- †Cratopteryx ^{c g}
- †Diegopteryx ^{c g}
- †Paracaririneura ^{c g}
- †Pseudonymphes ^{c g}

Data sources: i = ITIS, c = Catalogue of Life, g = GBIF, b = Bugguide.net a = Australian Faunal Directory
