= Acanthaclisini =

Scientific classification
- Domain: Eukaryota
- Kingdom: Animalia
- Phylum: Arthropoda
- Class: Insecta
- Order: Neuroptera
- Superfamily: Myrmeleontoidea
- Family: Myrmeleontidae
- Subfamily: Myrmeleontinae
- Tribe: Acanthaclisini; Navás, 1912

Tribe of insects

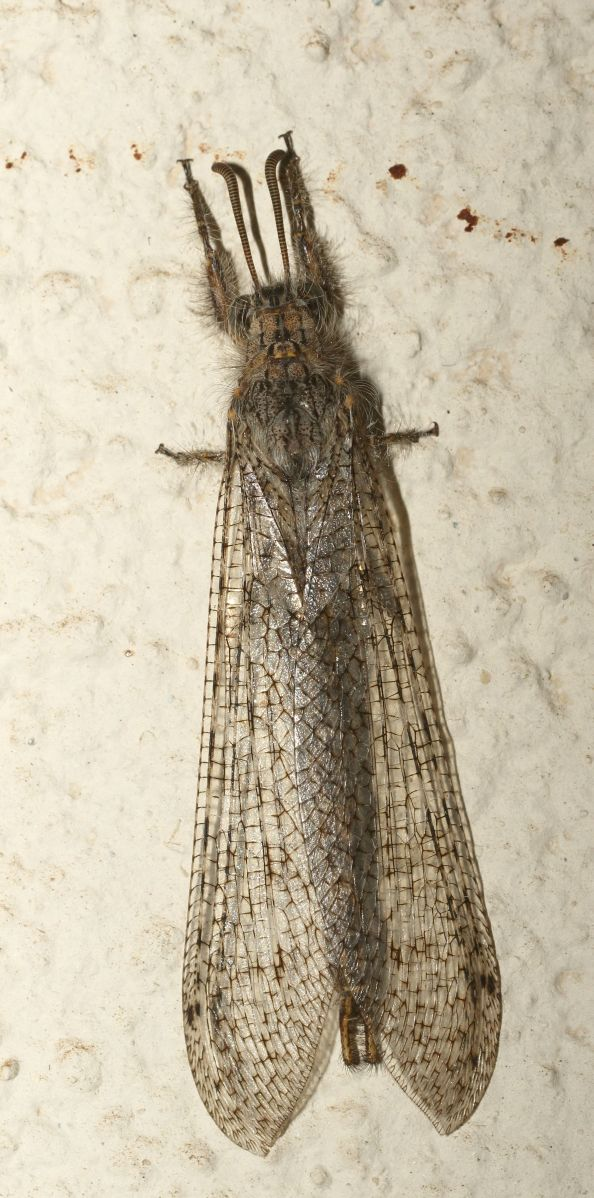
Male Centroclisis vitanda

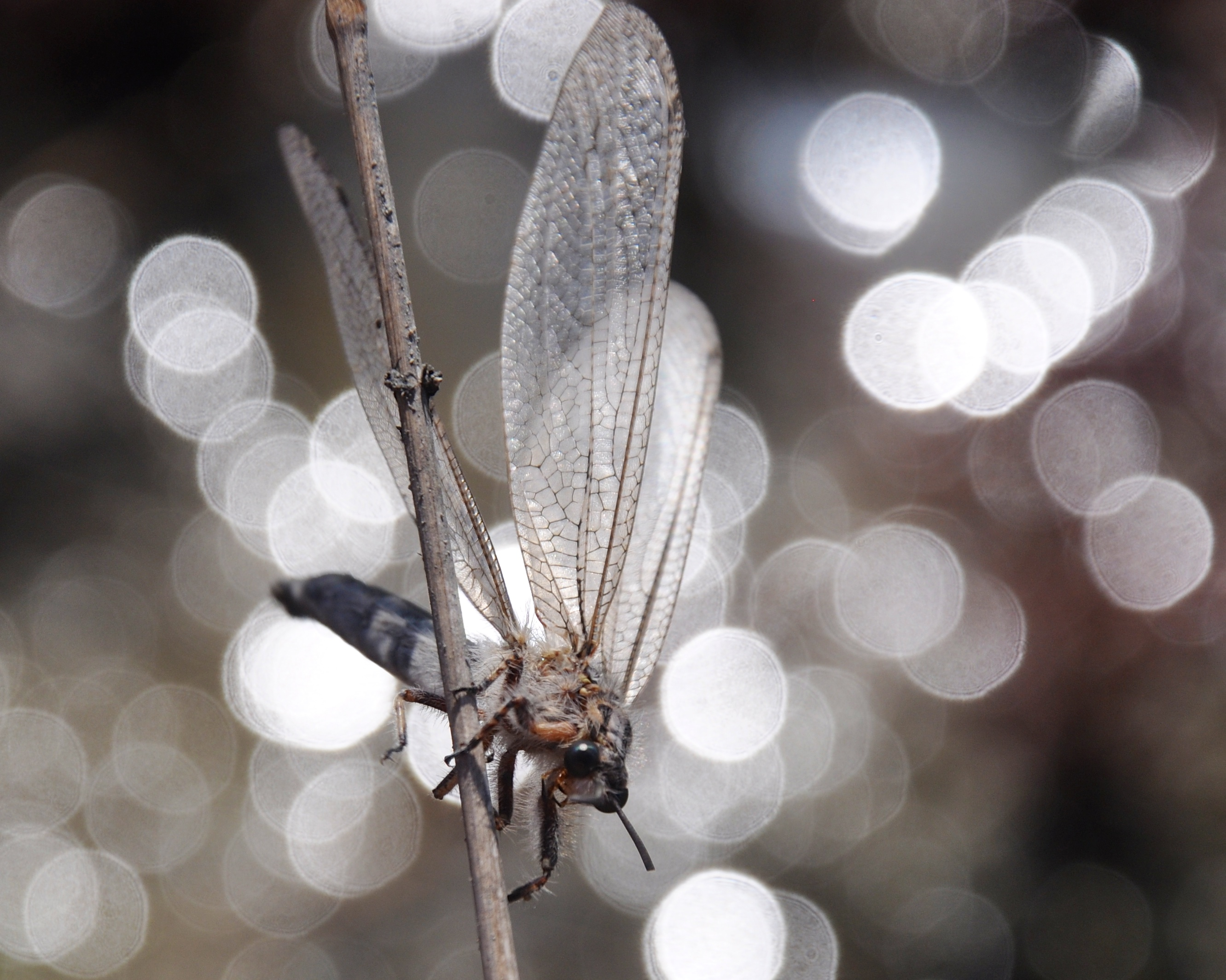
Acanthaclisis occitanica

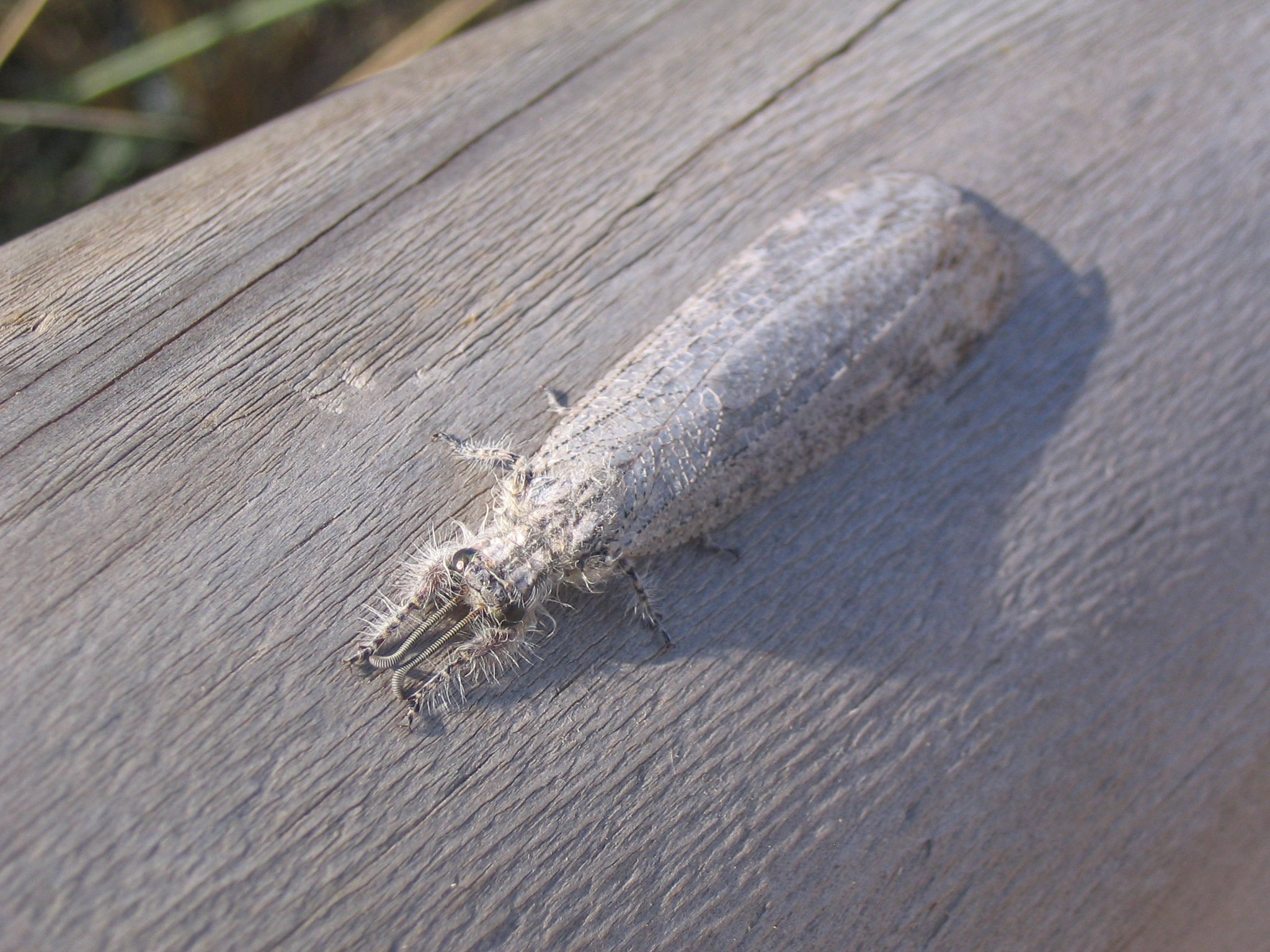
Synclisis baetica

Acanthaclisini is a tribe in the antlion subfamily Myrmeleontinae.

The larvae of most species live in open tracts of fairly deep sand, and do not construct pitfall traps. They burrow beneath the surface of the sand which needs to be deep enough to allow temperature regulation, concealment from predators and space to hunt prey. Many hunt both on the soil surface and beneath it.

== Genera ==
These 16 genera belong to the tribe Acanthaclisini:

- Acanthaclisis Rambur, 1842^{i c g}
- Arcuaplectron New, 1985^{i c g}
- Centroclisis Navás, 1909^{i c g}
- Cosina Navás, 1912^{i c g}
- Fadrina Navás, 1912^{i c g}
- Heoclisis Navás, 1923^{i c g}
- Jaya Navás, 1912^{i c g}
- Madrastra Navás, 1912^{i c g}
- Mestressa Navás, 1914^{i c g}
- Paranthaclisis Banks, 1907^{i c g b}
- Phanoclisis Banks, 1913^{i c g}
- Stiphroneura Gerstaecker, 1885^{i c g}
- Synclisis Navás, 1919^{i c g}
- Syngenes Kolbe, 1897^{i c g}
- Vella Navas, 1913^{i c g b}
- Vellasa Navás, 1924^{i g}

Data sources: i = ITIS, c = Catalogue of Life, g = GBIF, b = Bugguide.net
