= Ameromyia modesta =

Scientific classification
- Kingdom: Animalia
- Phylum: Arthropoda
- Clade: Pancrustacea
- Class: Insecta
- Order: Neuroptera
- Family: Myrmeleontidae
- Genus: Ameromyia
- Species: A. modesta

Binomial name
- Ameromyia modesta (Banks, 1943)

Species of insect

Ameromyia modesta is a species of antlions from the Myrmeleontinae subfamily. The scientific name of this species was first published in 1943 by Banks.
