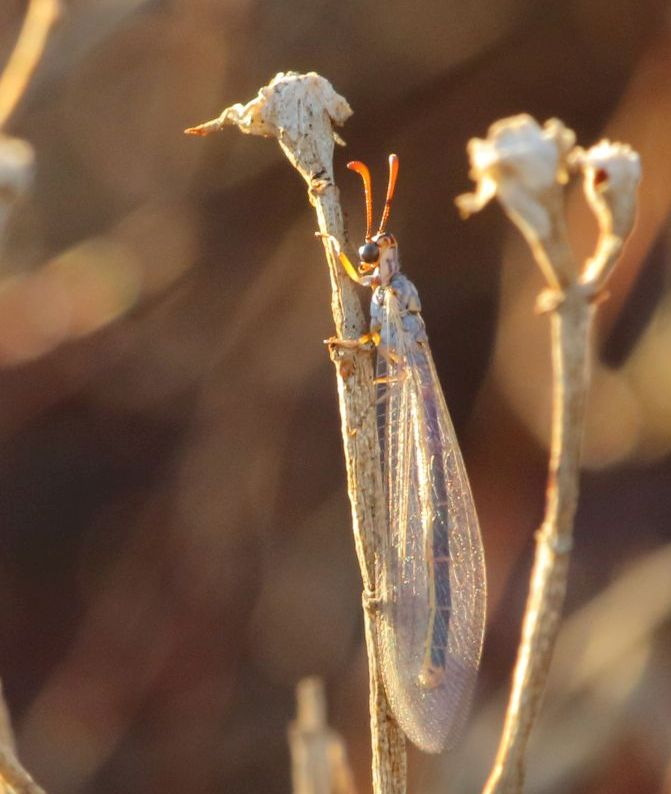
- Myrmeleon doralice

Scientific classification
- Kingdom: Animalia
- Phylum: Arthropoda
- Clade: Pancrustacea
- Class: Insecta
- Order: Neuroptera
- Family: Myrmeleontidae
- Subfamily: Myrmeleontinae
- Tribe: Myrmeleontini; Banks, 1911

= Myrmeleontini =

Tribe of insects

Myrmeleontini is an antlion tribe in the subfamily Myrmeleontinae.

== Genera ==
The following genera are recognised in the tribe Myrmeleontini:These include 12 genera that were previously considered junior synonyms.

- Ancyroleon Zheng & Liu 2026
- Australeon Miller and Stange, 2012
- Baliga Navás, 1912
- Baligaptes Zheng & Liu 2026
- Banyaleon Zheng & Liu, 2026
- Bordus Navás, 1936
- Callistoleon Banks, 1910
- Cocius Navás, 1919
- Dictyoleon Esben-Petersen, 1923
- Enza Navás, 1912
- Euroleon Esben-Petersen, 1918
- Hagenomyia Banks, 1911
- Kirghizoleon Krivokhatsky and Zakharenko, 1994
- Macroleon Banks, 1909
- Megistoleon Navás, 1931
- Melanobaliga Zheng & Liu 2026
- Moreyus Navás, 1914
- Morter Navás, 1915
- Myrmeleodes Navás, 1912
- Myrmeleon Linnaeus, 1767
- Neleon Navás, 1915
- Neohornius Navás, 1925
- Neseurus Navás, 1916
- Orientaleon Zheng & Liu 2026
- Porrerus Navás, 1913
- Sinobaliga Zheng & Liu 2026
- Tafanerus Navás, 1921
- Weeleus Navás, 1912
