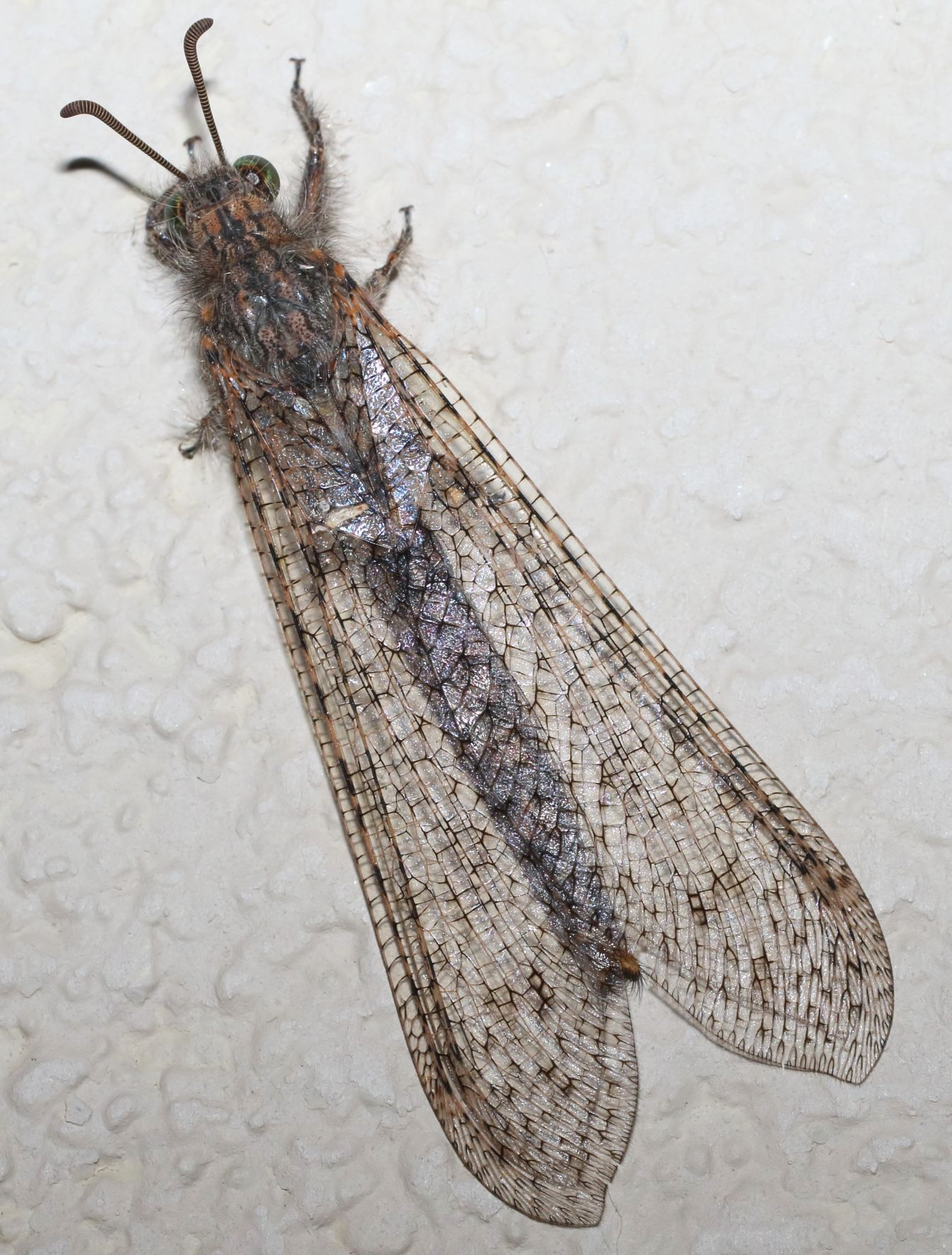
- Centroclisis maligna

Scientific classification
- Domain: Eukaryota
- Kingdom: Animalia
- Phylum: Arthropoda
- Class: Insecta
- Order: Neuroptera
- Family: Myrmeleontidae
- Subfamily: Myrmeleontinae
- Tribe: Acanthaclisini
- Genus: Centroclisis; Navas, 1909

= Centroclisis =

Genus of insects

Centroclisis is a genus of antlions (Myrmeleontidae) with about 56 species occurring in Africa and Asia. They are known as bark antlions - during the day they rest on the bark of trees, with their wings flattened. At night they may be attracted to lights.

== Species ==
=== Centroclisis maligna ===
Widespread and fairly common in the drier western parts of southern Africa. It can be distinguished from other Centroclisis species by its reddish colour. The larvae are large and robust; they live in sandy soils, but do not make pitfall traps.

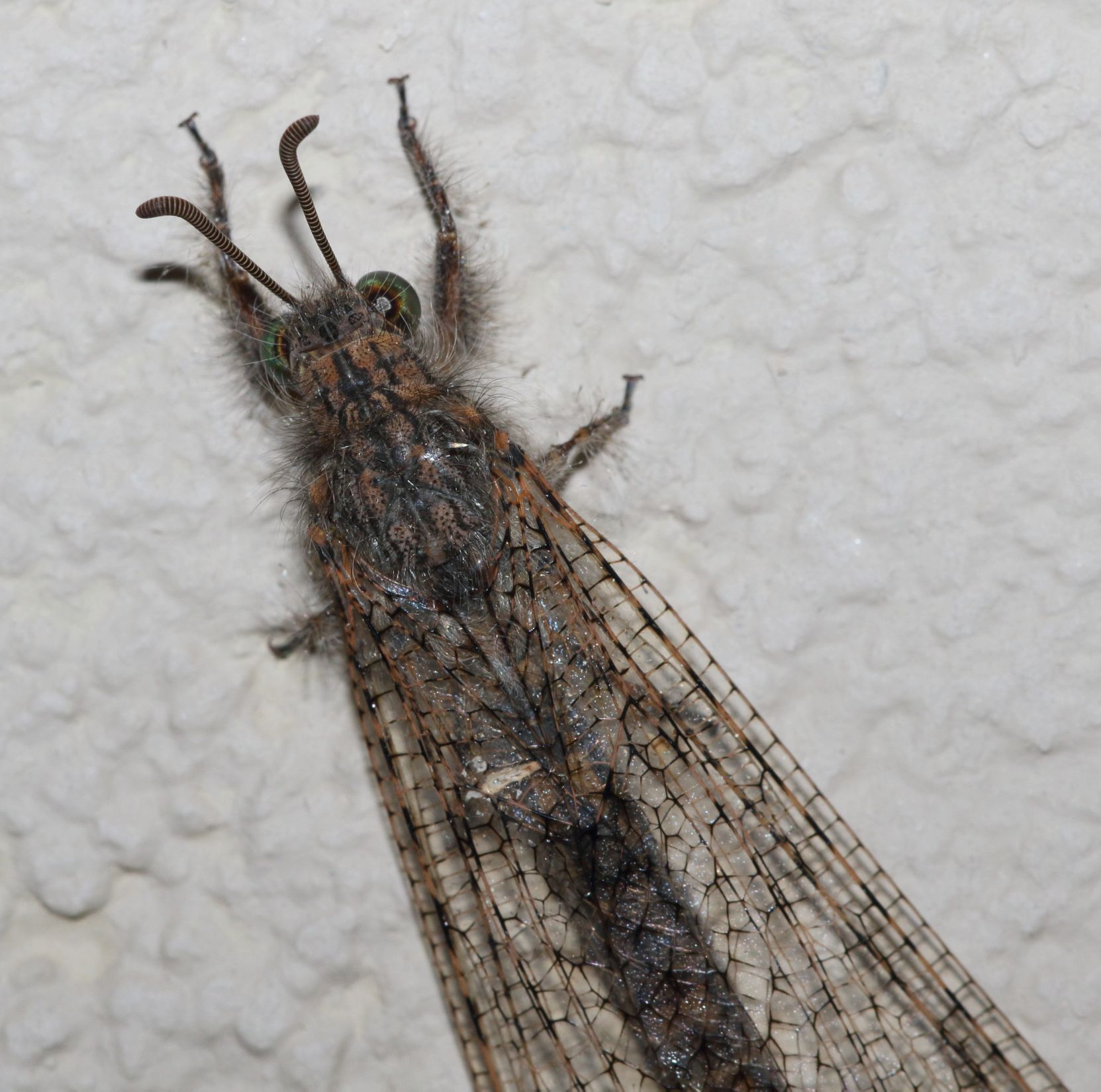
Britstown, N. Cape

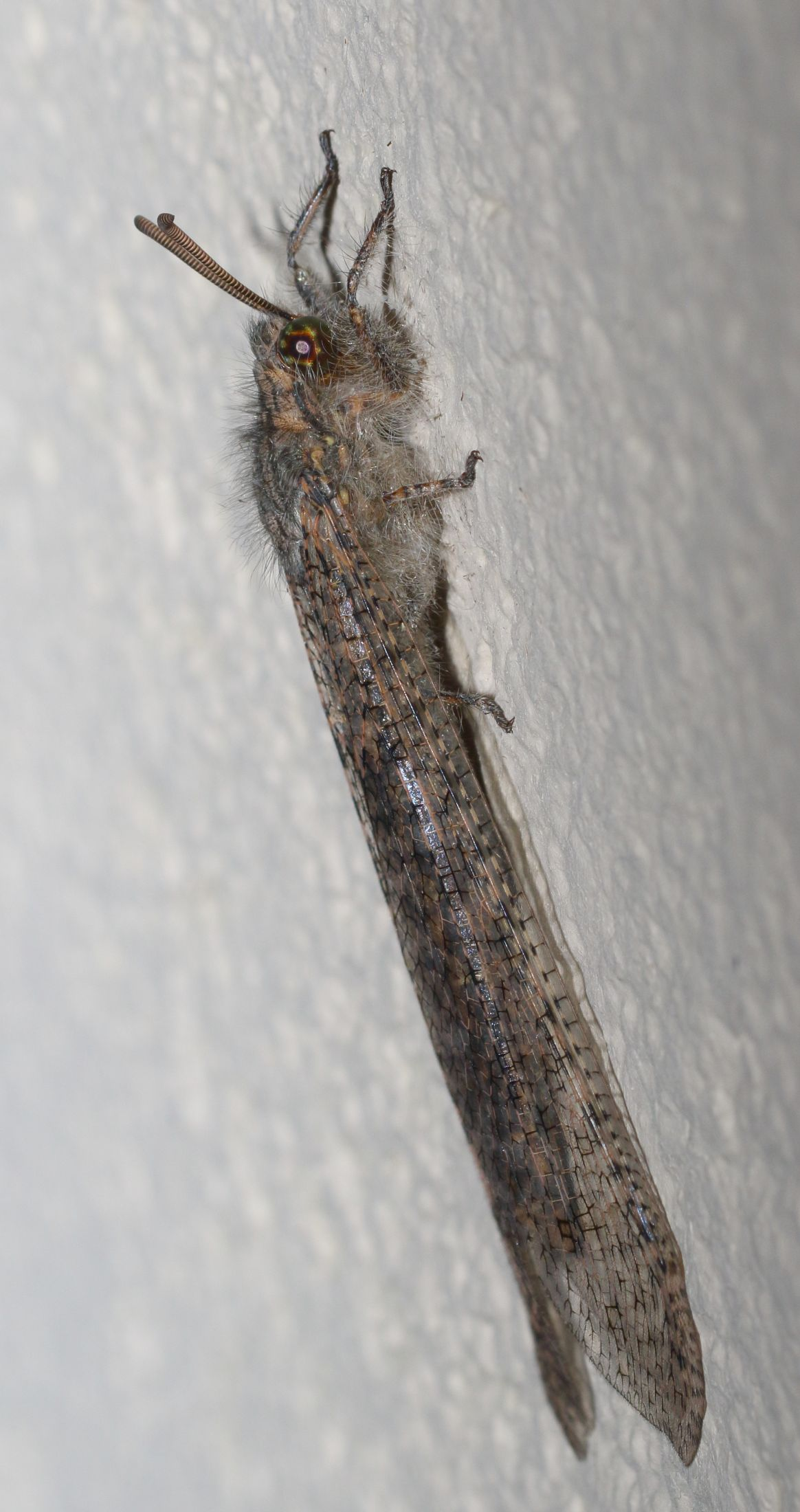
Britstown, N. Cape

=== Centroclisis vitanda ===
This species is endemic to South Africa; it is known only from the Eastern Cape, Northern Cape and Free State provinces. The male has long ectoprocts. During the day it normally rests, well camouflaged, on bark. Its immature stages are poorly known, but the larvae probably live in sandy soils.

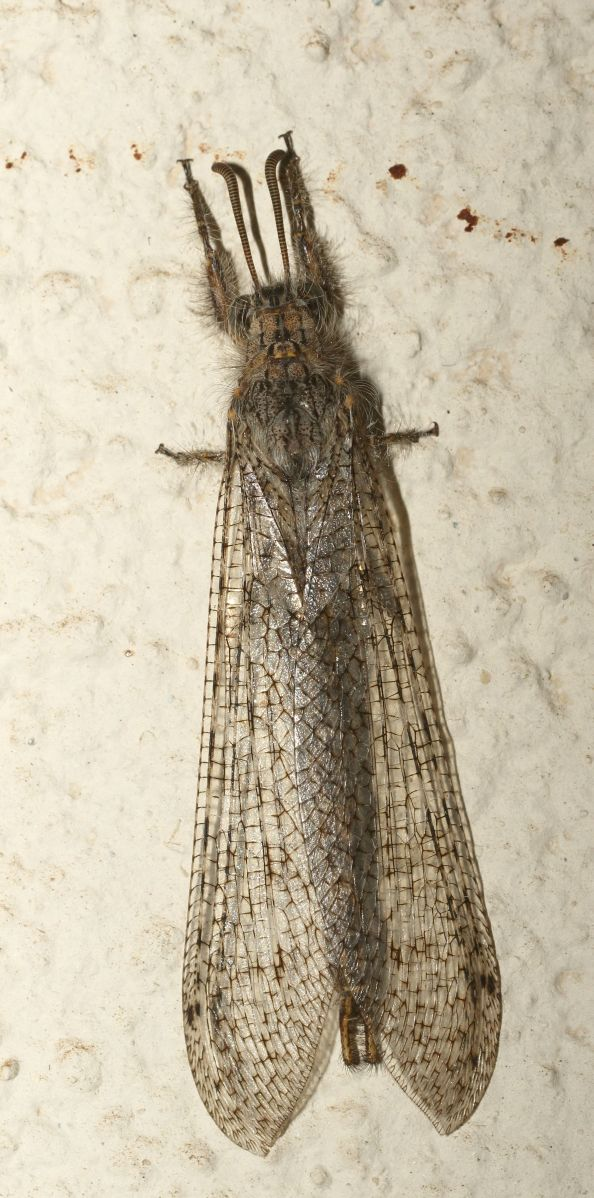
Male Centroclisis vitanda
