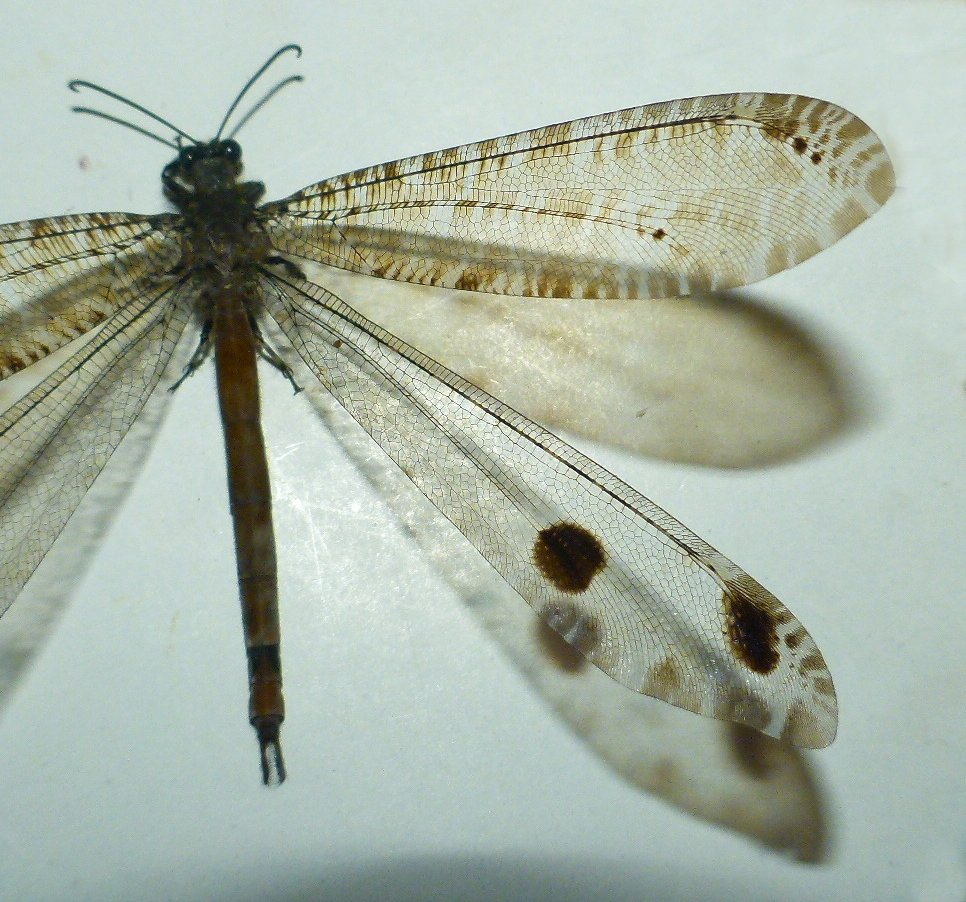
- Stiphroneura inclusa from the Western Ghats

Scientific classification
- Kingdom: Animalia
- Phylum: Arthropoda
- Clade: Pancrustacea
- Class: Insecta
- Order: Neuroptera
- Family: Myrmeleontidae
- Subfamily: Myrmeleontinae
- Tribe: Acanthaclisini
- Genus: Stiphroneura; Gerstaecker, 1885

Type species
- Myrmeleon inclusus Walker, 1853

Synonyms
- Vellassa Navás, 1924

= Stiphroneura =

Genus of insects

Stiphroneura is a genus of antlions with two species in tropical Asia, restricted to the Oriental Realm. It is among about 16 genera in the tribe Acanthaclisini. These are large antlions, with the wings being 6.5 to 7.5 cm long. The antennae are as long as the thorax. The pronotum is longer than wide.

Two species are placed in the genus:

- Stiphroneura inclusa (Walker, 1853) - Vietnam, Myanmar, Laos, Nepal, India
- Stiphroneura maunieri (Navás, 1924) - Vietnam
