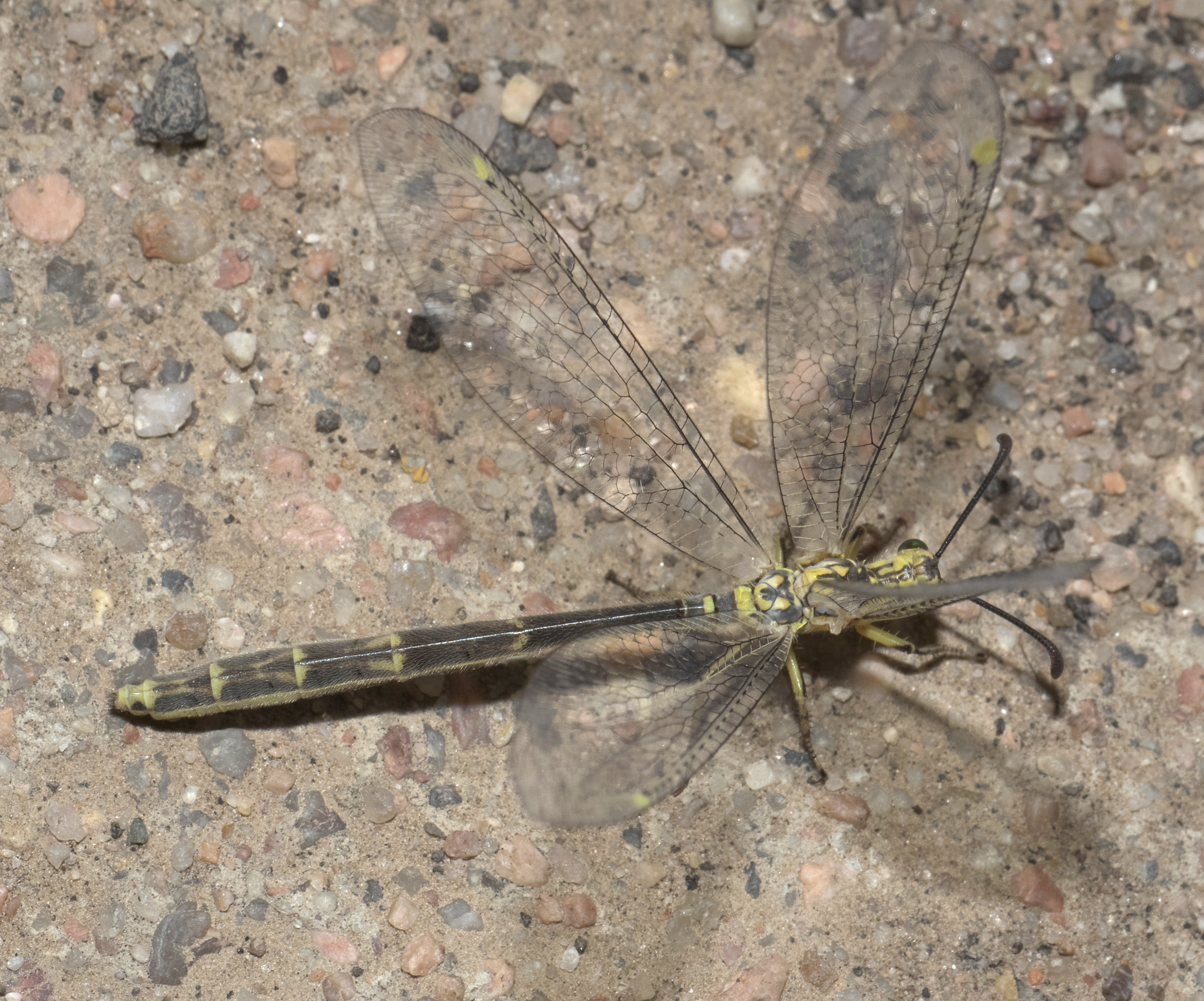
- Scotoleon nigrilabris, Colorado

Scientific classification
- Domain: Eukaryota
- Kingdom: Animalia
- Phylum: Arthropoda
- Class: Insecta
- Order: Neuroptera
- Family: Myrmeleontidae
- Genus: Scotoleon
- Species: S. nigrilabris

Binomial name
- Scotoleon nigrilabris (Hagen, 1888)

Synonyms
- Brachynemurus nigrilabris Hagen, 1888

= Scotoleon nigrilabris =

Species of insect

Scotoleon nigrilabris is a species of antlion in the family Myrmeleontidae. It is found in Central America and North America.
