= Jaya (insect) =

Scientific classification
- Kingdom: Animalia
- Phylum: Arthropoda
- Class: Insecta
- Order: Neuroptera
- Family: Myrmeleontidae
- Subfamily: Myrmeleontinae
- Tribe: Acanthaclisini
- Genus: Jaya; Navas, 1912

Genus of insects

Jaya is a genus of antlions (Myrmeleontidae) with 5 species occurring in Africa and Eurasia.

== Species ==
- Jaya atrata (Fabricius, 1781)
- Jaya dasymalla (Gerstaecker, 1863)
- Jaya rogeri Navás, 1912
- Jaya stephaniae Insom & Terzani, 2014
- Jaya waterloti (Navás, 1914)
