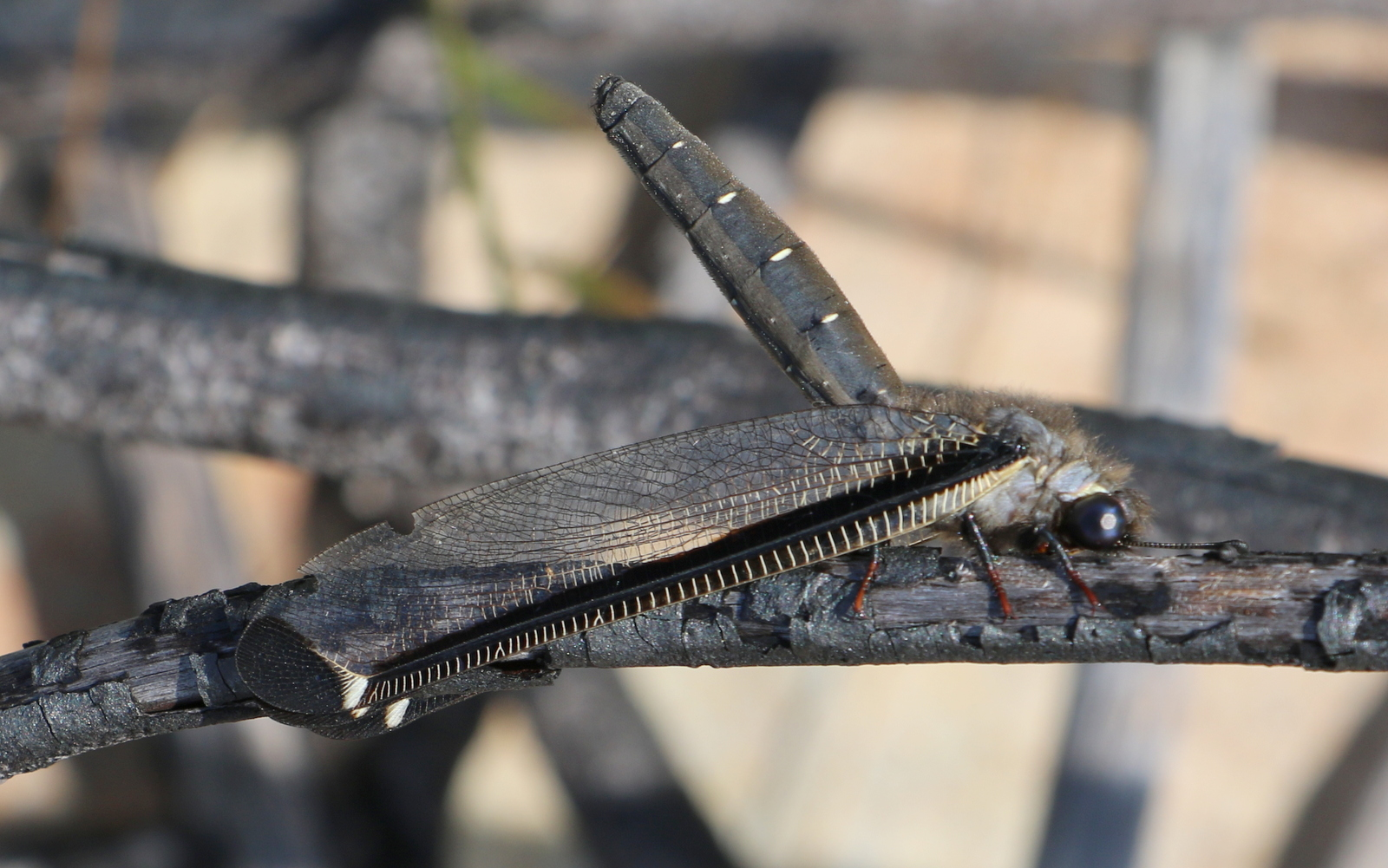
- Ku-ring-gai Chase National Park

Scientific classification
- Domain: Eukaryota
- Kingdom: Animalia
- Phylum: Arthropoda
- Class: Insecta
- Order: Neuroptera
- Family: Myrmeleontidae
- Genus: Stilbopteryx
- Species: S. costalis

Binomial name
- Stilbopteryx costalis Newman, 1838

= Stilbopteryx costalis =

Species of insect

Stilbopteryx costalis is a large Australian insect in the antlion family.
