= Brachynemurus longicaudus =

Scientific classification
- Domain: Eukaryota
- Kingdom: Animalia
- Phylum: Arthropoda
- Class: Insecta
- Order: Neuroptera
- Family: Myrmeleontidae
- Genus: Brachynemurus
- Species: B. longicaudus

Binomial name
- Brachynemurus longicaudus (Burmeister, 1839)

Species of insect

Brachynemurus longicaudus is a species of antlion in the family Myrmeleontidae. It is found in North America.
