= Heoclisis fulva =

Scientific classification
- Domain: Eukaryota
- Kingdom: Animalia
- Phylum: Arthropoda
- Class: Insecta
- Order: Neuroptera
- Family: Myrmeleontidae
- Genus: Heoclisis
- Species: H. fulva

Binomial name
- Heoclisis fulva (Esben-Petersen, 1912)

Synonyms
- Acanthaclisis fulva Esben-Petersen, 1912; Acanthaclisis peterseni Tillyard, 1916

Species of insects

Heoclisis fulva is a species of cave-dwelling antlion (or Myrmeleontidae), found in Australia, in Queensland, Western Australia and the Northern Territory.

The species was first described as Acanthaclisis fulva in 1912 by Peter Esben-Petersen.

Miller and Stange describe this species as not being a true cave-dwelling antlion, because not all life stages are confined to caves.

== Description ==
H. fulva is the largest Heoclisis in Australia, with an adult body length of 45–55 mm, forewing length of 53–74 mm, and hindwing 48–76 mm. The body, wings, face, antenna and abdomen are a yellowish-brown. The face, femur and tibia have white hairs. The larvae are pinkish and live on the floors of caves in areas which are protected from both sun and rain and where the substrate is large and deep enough to allow large antlion larvae to roam. It is thought that the larvae feed on other antlion larvae. The larvae do not make pitfall traps.
