= Paranthaclisis congener =

Scientific classification
- Domain: Eukaryota
- Kingdom: Animalia
- Phylum: Arthropoda
- Class: Insecta
- Order: Neuroptera
- Family: Myrmeleontidae
- Genus: Paranthaclisis
- Species: P. congener

Binomial name
- Paranthaclisis congener (Hagen, 1861)

Species of insect

Paranthaclisis congener is a species of antlion in the family Myrmeleontidae. It is found in Central America and North America. They are nocturnal.
