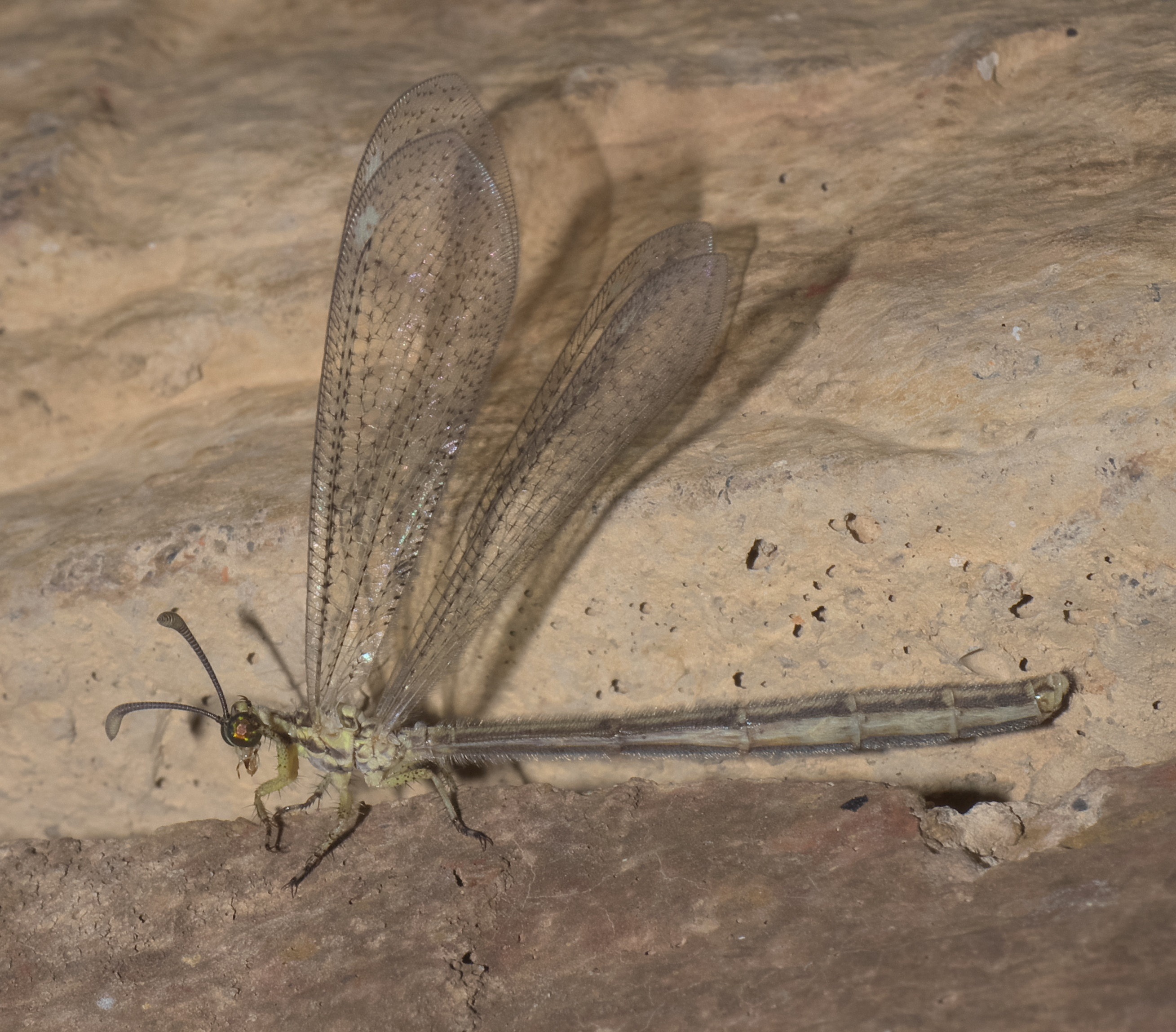

Scientific classification
- Kingdom: Animalia
- Phylum: Arthropoda
- Clade: Pancrustacea
- Class: Insecta
- Order: Neuroptera
- Family: Myrmeleontidae
- Genus: Brachynemurus
- Species: B. abdominalis

Binomial name
- Brachynemurus abdominalis (Say, 1823)

= Brachynemurus abdominalis =

Species of insect

Brachynemurus abdominalis is a species of antlion in the family Myrmeleontidae. It is found in Central America and North America.

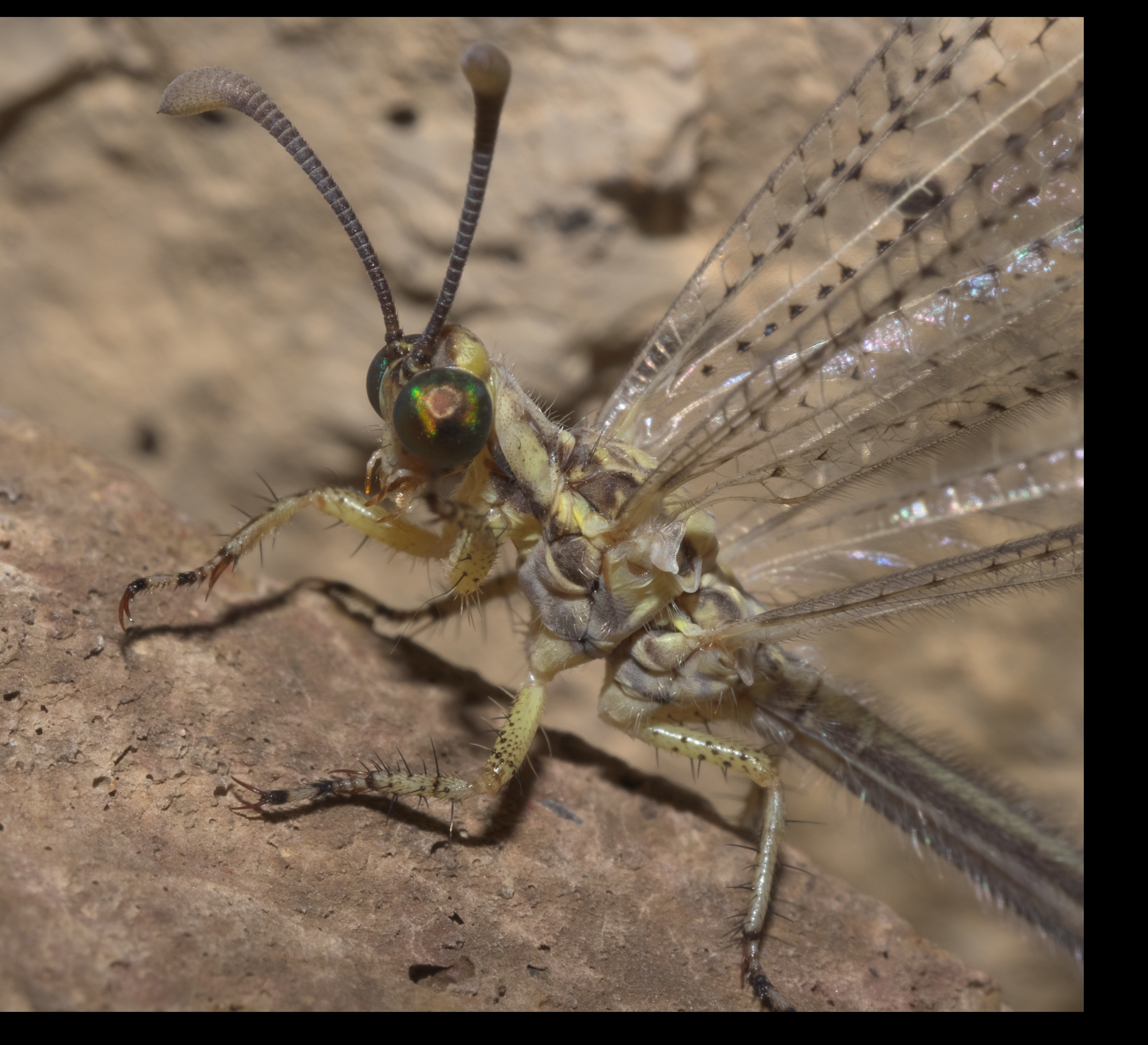
