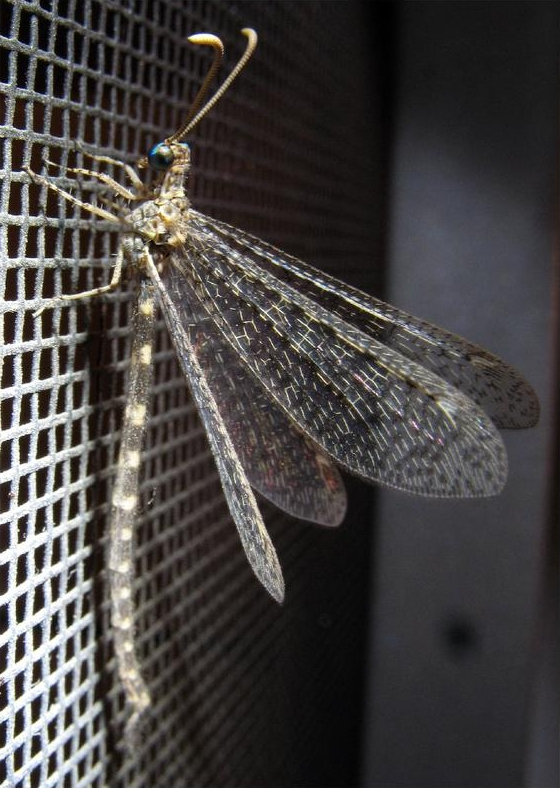

Scientific classification
- Domain: Eukaryota
- Kingdom: Animalia
- Phylum: Arthropoda
- Class: Insecta
- Order: Neuroptera
- Family: Myrmeleontidae
- Genus: Brachynemurus
- Species: B. sackeni

Binomial name
- Brachynemurus sackeni Hagen, 1888

= Brachynemurus sackeni =

Species of insect

Brachynemurus sackeni is a species of antlion in the family Myrmeleontidae. It is found in Central America and North America.
