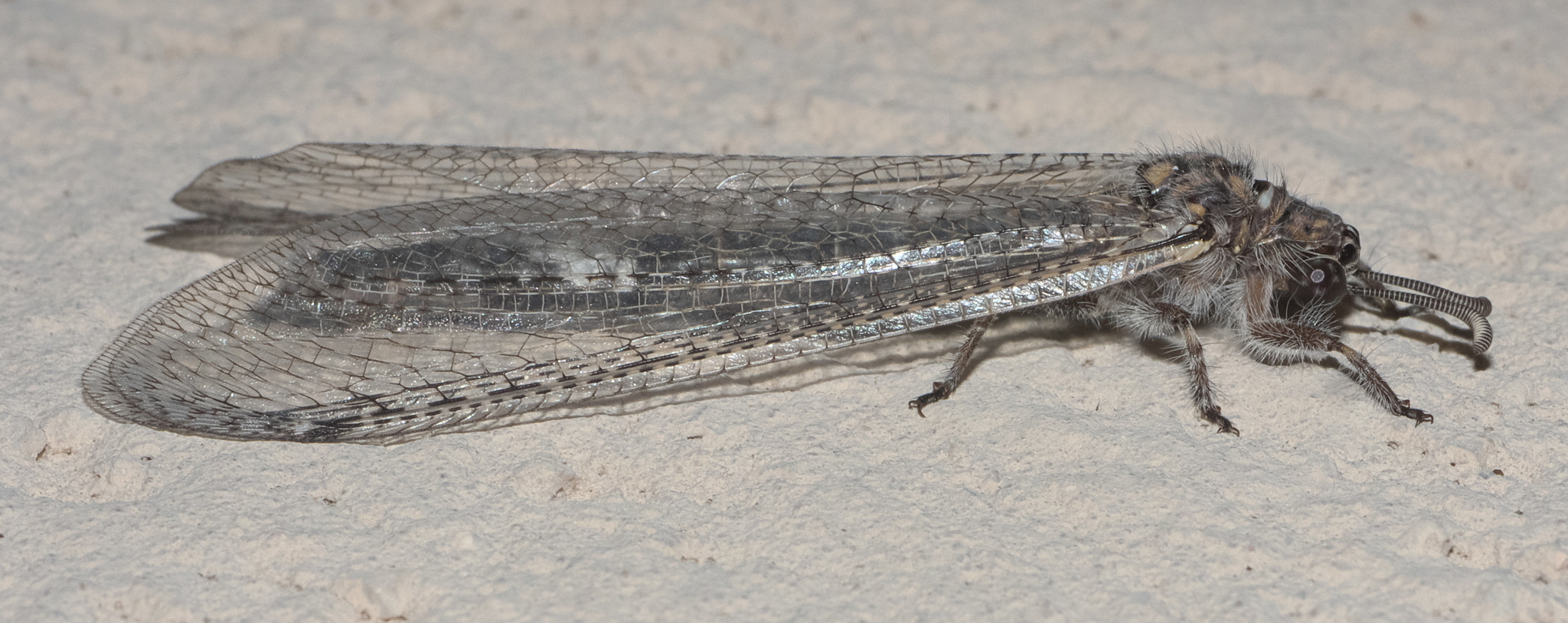
- Paranthaclisis hageni

Scientific classification
- Kingdom: Animalia
- Phylum: Arthropoda
- Class: Insecta
- Order: Neuroptera
- Family: Myrmeleontidae
- Subfamily: Myrmeleontinae
- Tribe: Acanthaclisini
- Genus: Paranthaclisis; Banks, 1907

= Paranthaclisis =

Genus of insects

Paranthaclisis is a genus of antlions in the family Myrmeleontidae. There are five described species in Paranthaclisis.

== Species ==
These five species belong to the genus Paranthaclisis:

- Paranthaclisis californica Navás, 1922
- Paranthaclisis congener (Hagen, 1861)
- Paranthaclisis floridensis Stange & Miller, 2012
- Paranthaclisis hageni (Banks, 1899)
- Paranthaclisis nevadensis Banks, 1939
