= Madrastra =

Scientific classification
- Domain: Eukaryota
- Kingdom: Animalia
- Phylum: Arthropoda
- Class: Insecta
- Order: Neuroptera
- Family: Myrmeleontidae
- Subfamily: Myrmeleontinae
- Tribe: Acanthaclisini
- Genus: Madrastra; Navás, 1912
- Species: M. handlirschi

Binomial name
- Madrastra handlirschi Navás, 1912

Genus of insects

Madrastra is a monotypic genus of antlions belonging to the family Myrmeleontidae. The only species is Madrastra handlirschi.
