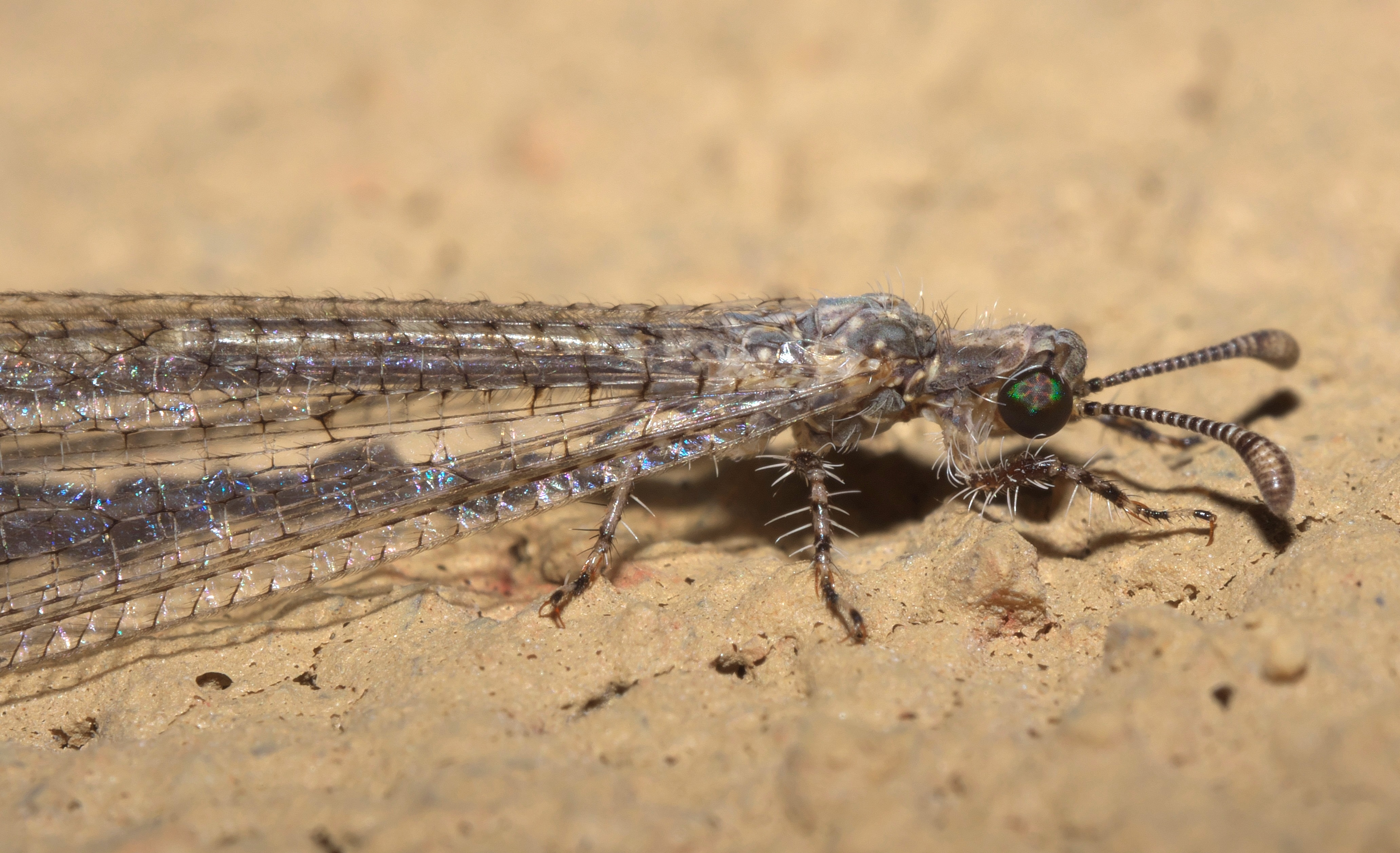
- Peruveleon dorsalis, Texas

Scientific classification
- Domain: Eukaryota
- Kingdom: Animalia
- Phylum: Arthropoda
- Class: Insecta
- Order: Neuroptera
- Family: Myrmeleontidae
- Genus: Peruveleon
- Species: P. dorsalis

Binomial name
- Peruveleon dorsalis (Banks, 1903)

Synonyms
- Brachynemurus dorsalis Banks, 1903

= Peruveleon dorsalis =

Species of insect

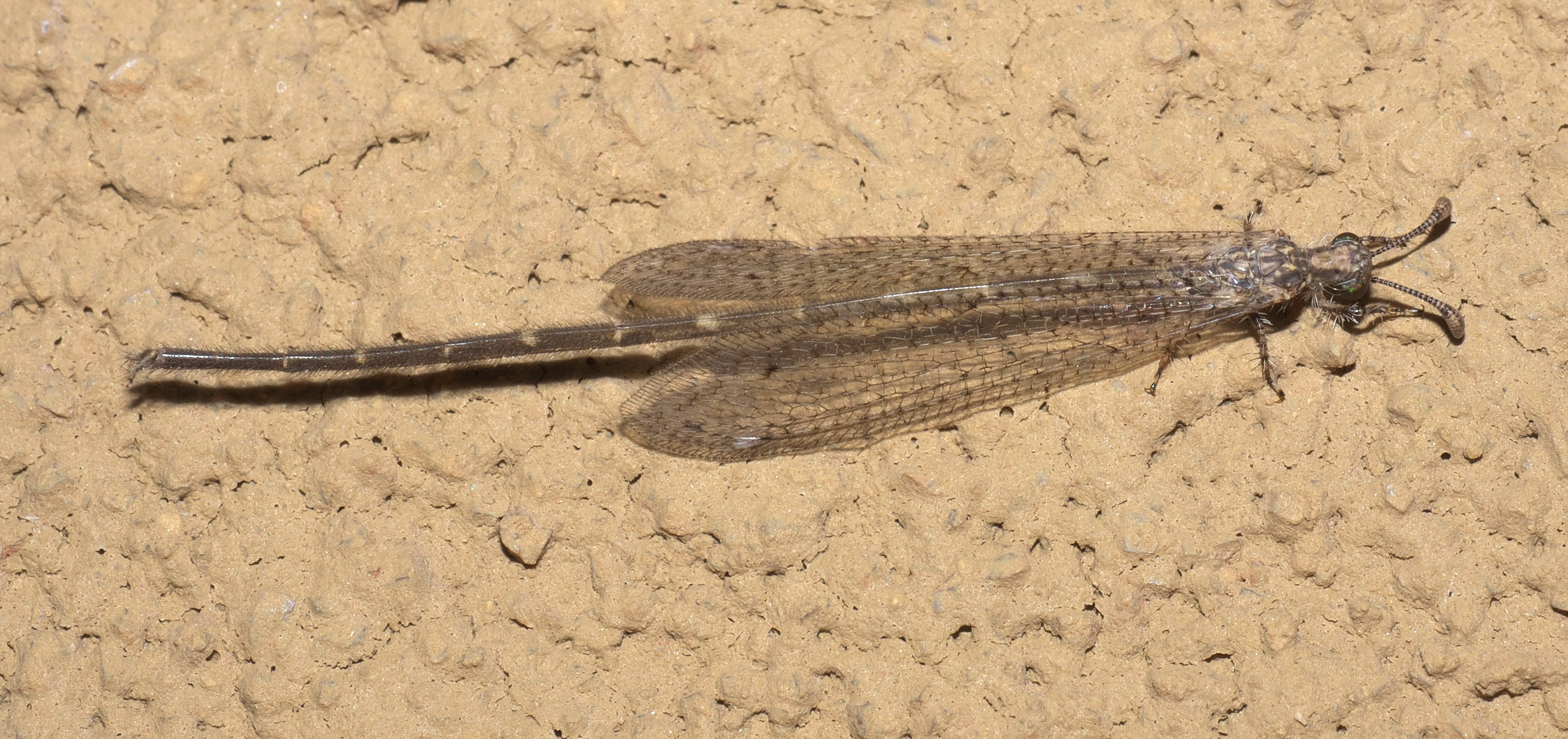
Peruveleon dorsalis, Texas

Peruveleon dorsalis is a species of antlion in the family Myrmeleontidae. It is found in Central America and North America.
