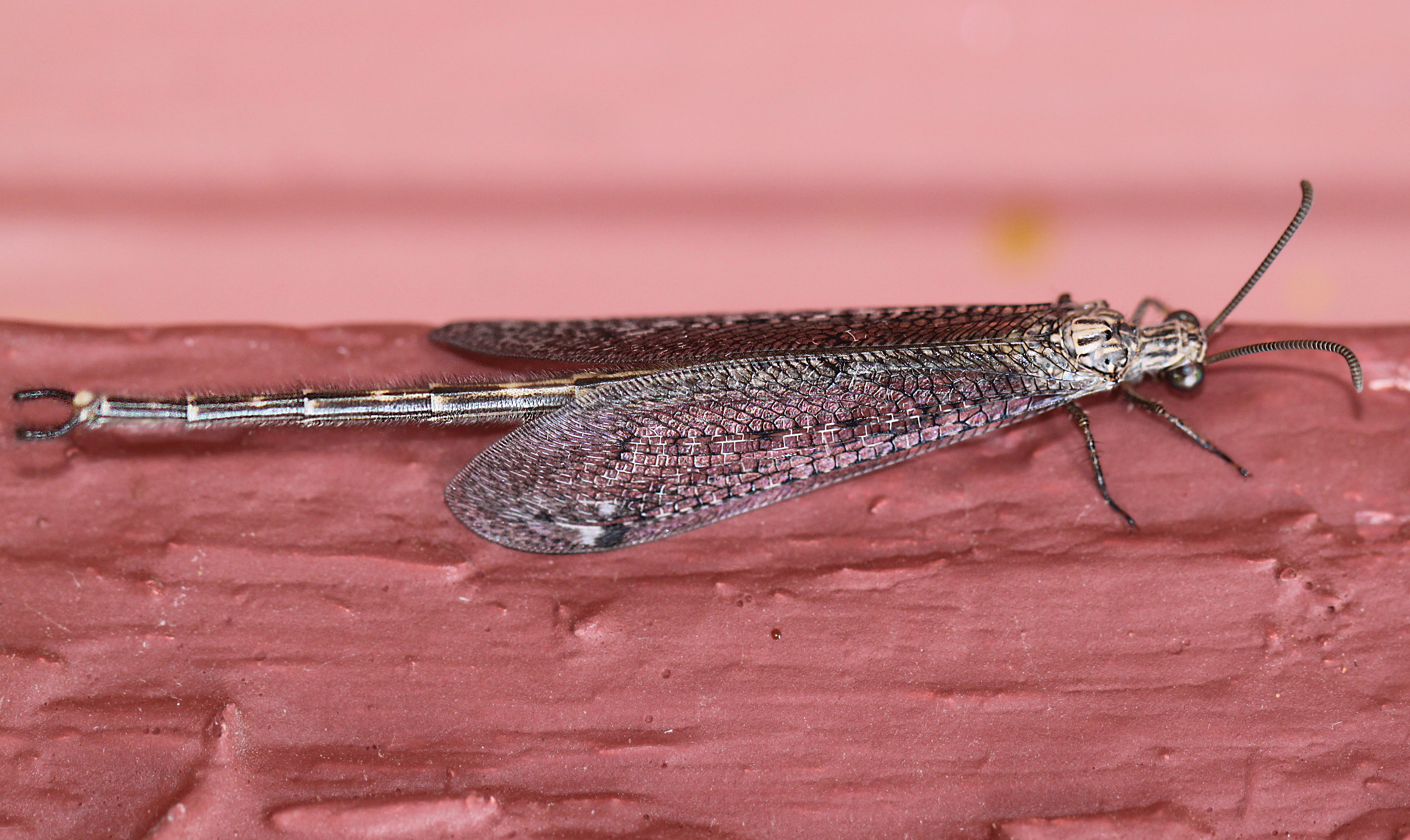

Scientific classification
- Kingdom: Animalia
- Phylum: Arthropoda
- Clade: Pancrustacea
- Class: Insecta
- Order: Neuroptera
- Family: Myrmeleontidae
- Genus: Brachynemurus
- Species: B. hubbardii

Binomial name
- Brachynemurus hubbardii Currie, 1898

= Brachynemurus hubbardii =

Species of insect

Brachynemurus hubbardii is a species of antlion in the family Myrmeleontidae. It is found in Central America and North America.
