= Brachynemurus signatus =

Scientific classification
- Domain: Eukaryota
- Kingdom: Animalia
- Phylum: Arthropoda
- Class: Insecta
- Order: Neuroptera
- Family: Myrmeleontidae
- Genus: Brachynemurus
- Species: B. signatus

Binomial name
- Brachynemurus signatus (Hagen, 1887)

Synonyms
- Ameroleon incertus Navás, 1926

Species of insect

Brachynemurus signatus is a species of antlion in the family Myrmeleontidae. It is found in North America.
