= Syngenes =

Scientific classification
- Domain: Eukaryota
- Kingdom: Animalia
- Phylum: Arthropoda
- Class: Insecta
- Order: Neuroptera
- Family: Myrmeleontidae
- Subfamily: Myrmeleontinae
- Tribe: Acanthaclisini
- Genus: Syngenes; Kolbe, 1897

Genus of insects

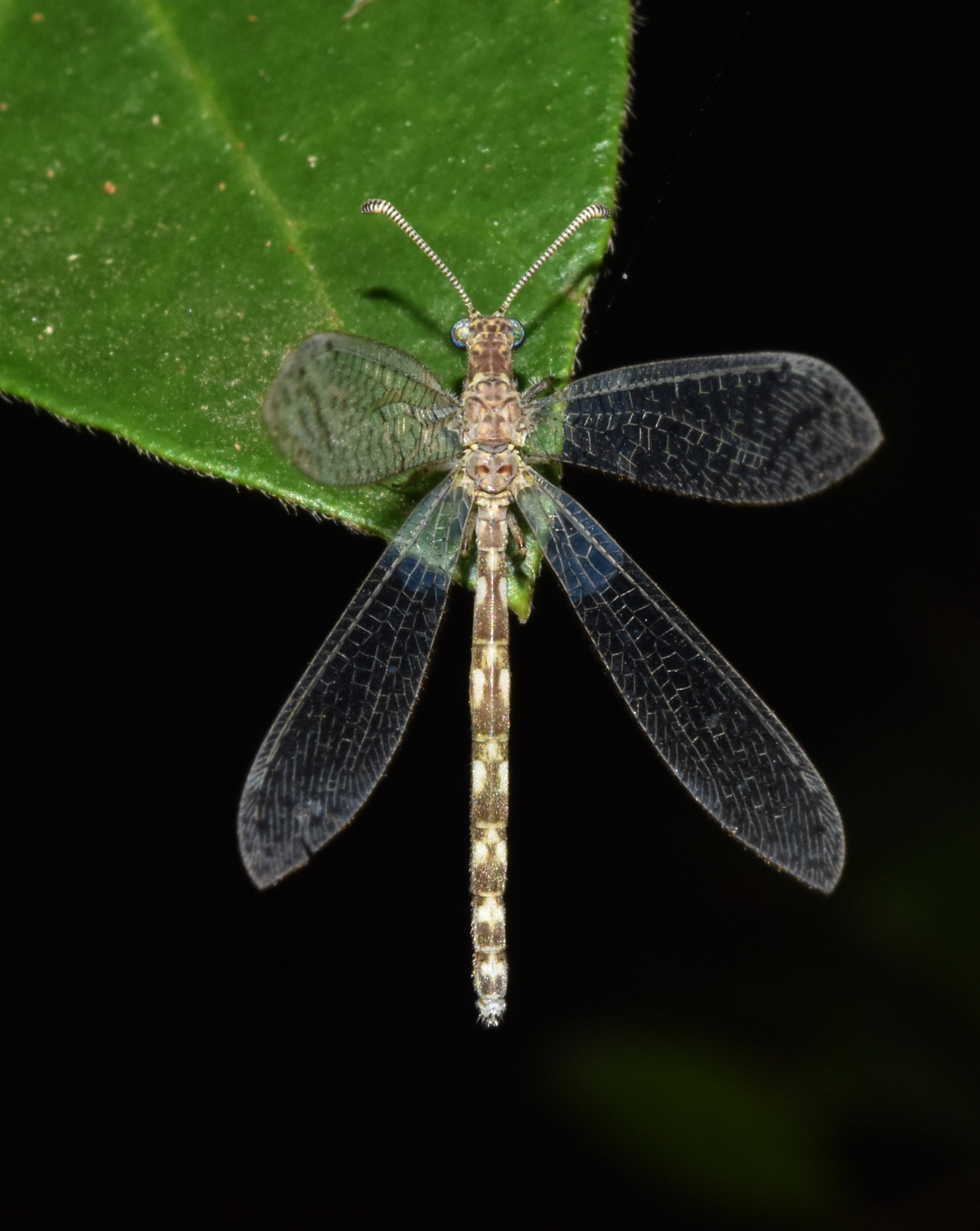
Syngenes longicornis

Syngenes is a genus of antlions belonging to the family Myrmeleontidae.

The species of this genus are found in Southern Africa.

Species:

- Syngenes alluaudi (van der Weele, 1909)
- Syngenes arabicus Kimmins, 1943
- Syngenes carfii Insome & Terzani, 2017
- Syngenes debilis (Gerstaecker, 1888)
- Syngenes dolichocercus Navás, 1914
- Syngenes horridus (Walker, 1853)
- Syngenes inquinatus (Gerstaecker, 1885)
- Syngenes longicornis (Rambur, 1842)
- Syngenes maritimus (Needham, 1913)
- Syngenes medialis Mansell, 2018
- Syngenes palpalis Banks, 1931
- Syngenes scholtzi Mansell, 2018
