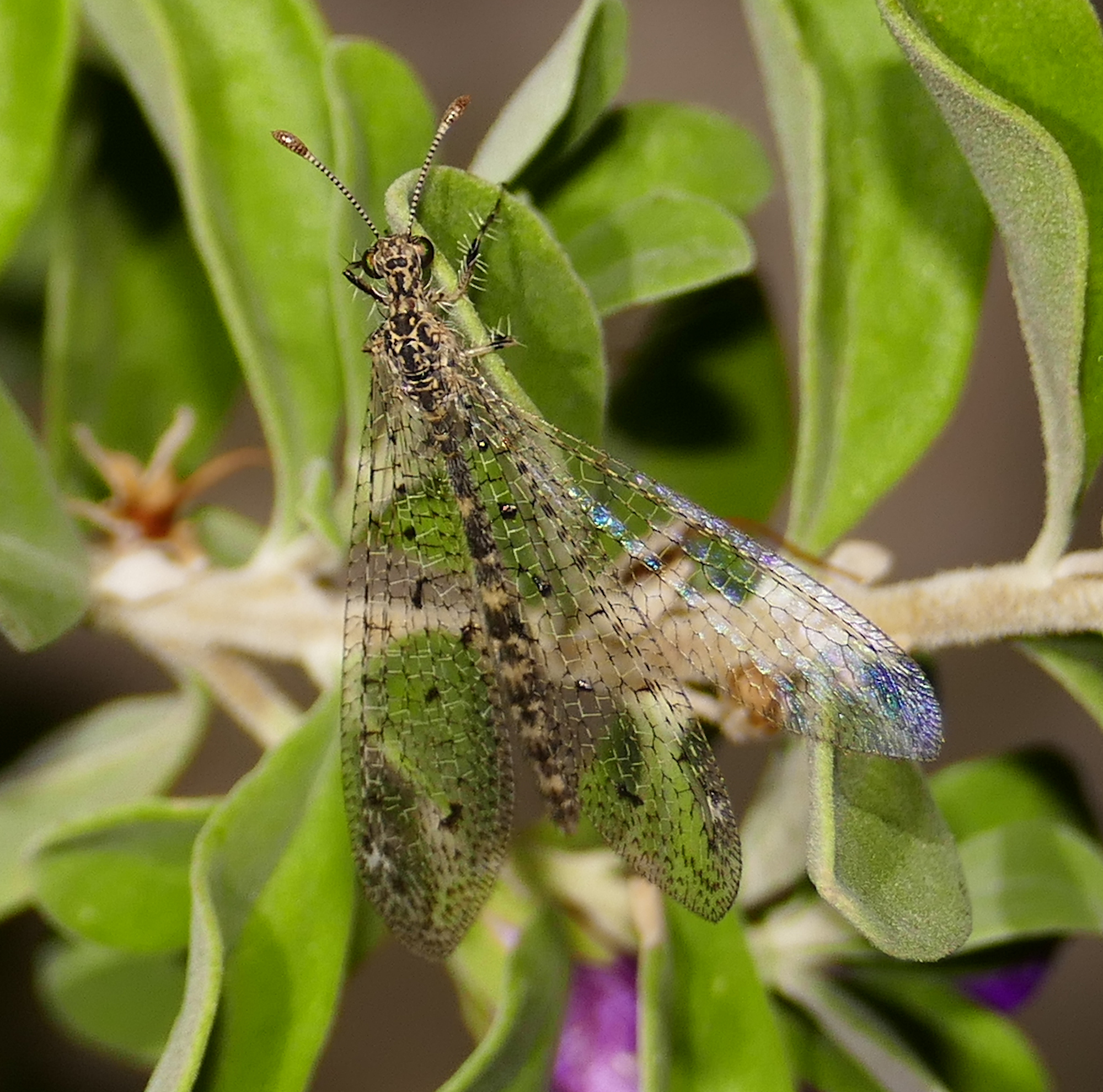
- Chaetoleon pusillus, Arizona

Scientific classification
- Domain: Eukaryota
- Kingdom: Animalia
- Phylum: Arthropoda
- Class: Insecta
- Order: Neuroptera
- Family: Myrmeleontidae
- Genus: Chaetoleon
- Species: C. pusillus

Binomial name
- Chaetoleon pusillus (Currie, 1899)

Synonyms
- Brachynemurus pusillus Currie, 1899

= Chaetoleon pusillus =

Species of insect

Chaetoleon pusillus is a species of antlion in the family Myrmeleontidae. It is found in Central America and North America.
