= Scotoleon dissimilis =

Scientific classification
- Domain: Eukaryota
- Kingdom: Animalia
- Phylum: Arthropoda
- Class: Insecta
- Order: Neuroptera
- Family: Myrmeleontidae
- Genus: Scotoleon
- Species: S. dissimilis

Binomial name
- Scotoleon dissimilis (Banks, 1903)

Synonyms
- Brachynemurus dissimilis Banks, 1903

Species of insect

Scotoleon dissimilis is a species of antlion in the family Myrmeleontidae. It is found in Central America and North America.
