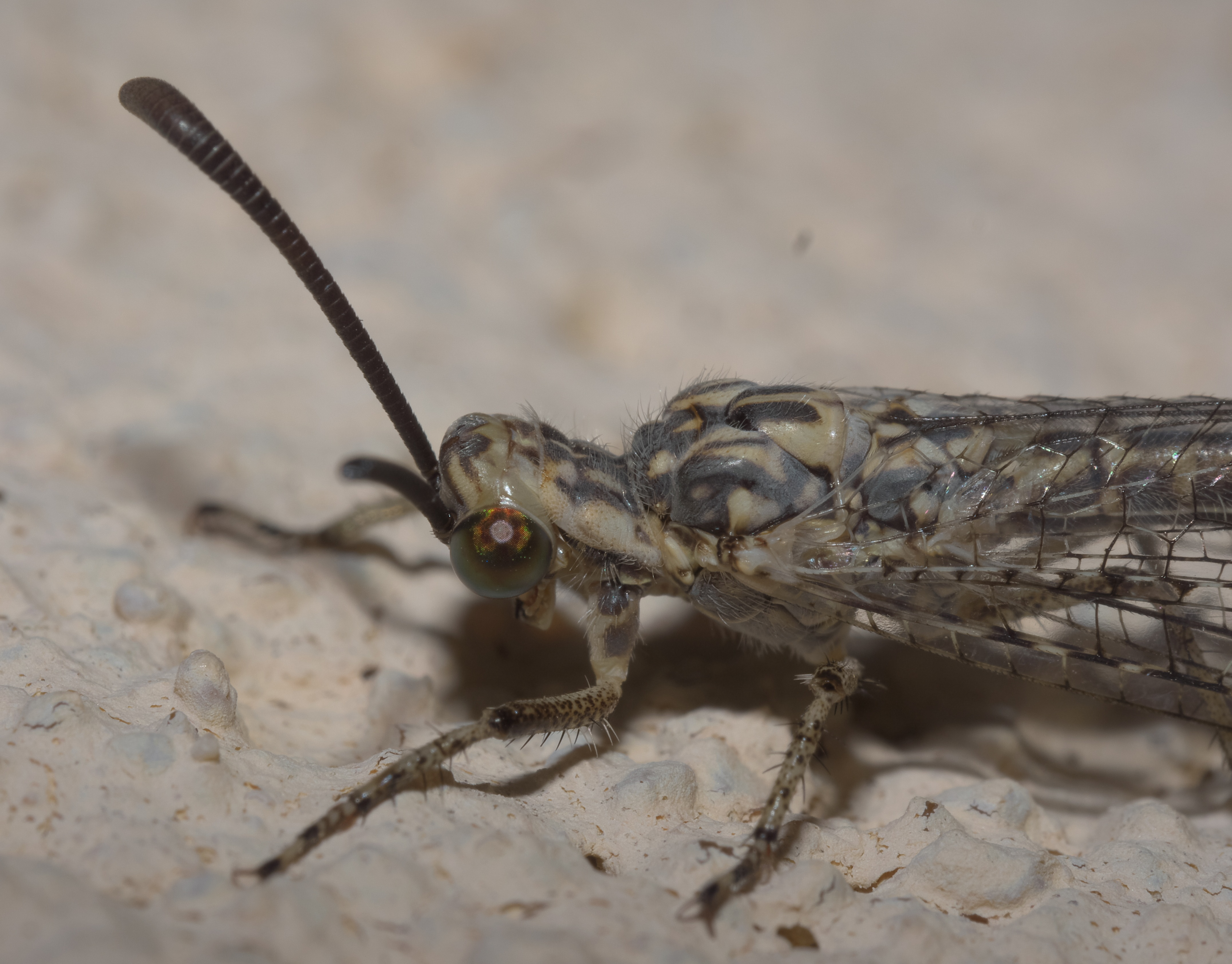

Scientific classification
- Domain: Eukaryota
- Kingdom: Animalia
- Phylum: Arthropoda
- Class: Insecta
- Order: Neuroptera
- Family: Myrmeleontidae
- Genus: Scotoleon
- Species: S. carrizonus

Binomial name
- Scotoleon carrizonus (Hagen, 1888)

Synonyms
- Brachynemurus carrizonus Hagen, 1888

= Scotoleon carrizonus =

Species of insect

Scotoleon carrizonus is a species of antlion in the family Myrmeleontidae. It is found in Central America and North America.
