= Ameromyia =

Scientific classification
- Domain: Eukaryota
- Kingdom: Animalia
- Phylum: Arthropoda
- Class: Insecta
- Order: Neuroptera
- Family: Myrmeleontidae
- Subfamily: Myrmeleontinae
- Genus: Ameromyia; Banks, 1913

Genus of insects

Ameromyia is a genus of antlions belonging to the family Myrmeleontidae.

The species of this genus are found in Southern America.

Species:

- Ameromyia dimidiata Navás, 1915
- Ameromyia hirsuta Navás, 1914
- Ameromyia modesta (Banks, 1943)
- Ameromyia muralli Navás, 1932
- Ameromyia nigriventris (Walker, 1860)
- Ameromyia pentheri Navás, 1914
- Ameromyia pleuralis Navás, 1926
- Ameromyia protensa (Gerstaecker, 1894)
- Ameromyia pubiventris (Walker, 1860)
- Ameromyia stevensi Navás, 1914
- Ameromyia strigosa (Banks, 1909)
- Ameromyia tendinosa (Gerstaecker, 1894)
