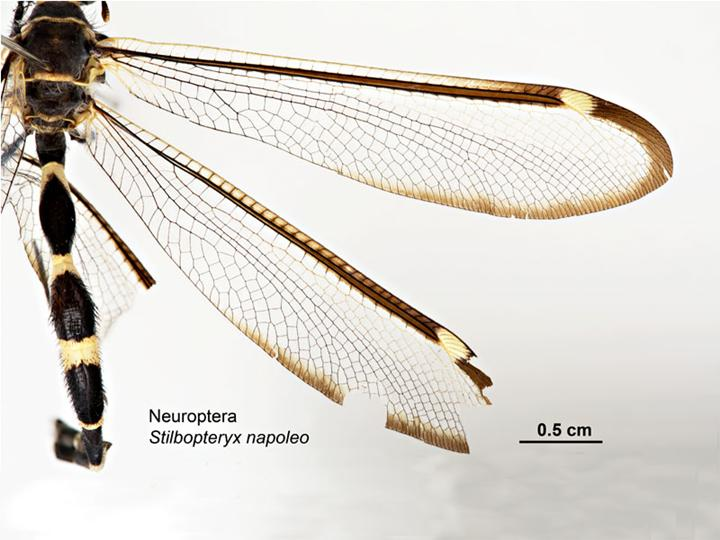
- Stilbopteryx napoleo

Scientific classification
- Kingdom: Animalia
- Phylum: Arthropoda
- Class: Insecta
- Order: Neuroptera
- Family: Myrmeleontidae
- Genus: Stilbopteryx; Newman, 1838

= Stilbopteryx =

Genus of insects

Stilbopteryx is a genus of antlions belonging to the family Myrmeleontidae. In recent classifications, that is further refined as Ascalaphinae, Stilbopterygini Newman, 1853. The species of this genus are found in Australia.

Species:

- Stilbopteryx albosetosa Riek, 1976
- Stilbopteryx auricornis Kimmins, 1940
- Stilbopteryx costalis Newman, 1838
- Stilbopteryx linearis Navás, 1911
- Stilbopteryx mouldsorum Smithers, 1989
- Stilbopteryx napoleo (Lefèbvre, 1842)
- Stilbopteryx walkeri Kimmins, 1940
