= Chaetoleon =

Scientific classification
- Domain: Eukaryota
- Kingdom: Animalia
- Phylum: Arthropoda
- Class: Insecta
- Order: Neuroptera
- Family: Myrmeleontidae
- Tribe: Brachynemurini
- Genus: Chaetoleon; Banks, 1920

Genus of insects

Chaetoleon is a genus of antlions in the family Myrmeleontidae. There are at least four described species in Chaetoleon.

== Species ==
These four species belong to the genus Chaetoleon:

- Chaetoleon pumilis (Burmeister, 1839)
- Chaetoleon pusillus (Currie, 1899)
- Chaetoleon tripunctatus (Banks, 1922)
- Chaetoleon variabilis Banks, 1942
