= Nosa (antlion) =

Scientific classification
- Domain: Eukaryota
- Kingdom: Animalia
- Phylum: Arthropoda
- Class: Insecta
- Order: Neuroptera
- Family: Ascalaphidae
- Subfamily: Ascalaphinae
- Tribe: Palparini
- Genus: Nosa; Navás, 1911

Species
- see text

Genus of insects

Nosa is an antlion genus in the tribe Palparini.

== Species ==
- Nosa adspersa Navás, 1914
- Nosa hamata (Kolbe, 1898)
- Nosa leonina Navás, 1911
- Nosa tigris (Dalman, 1823)
