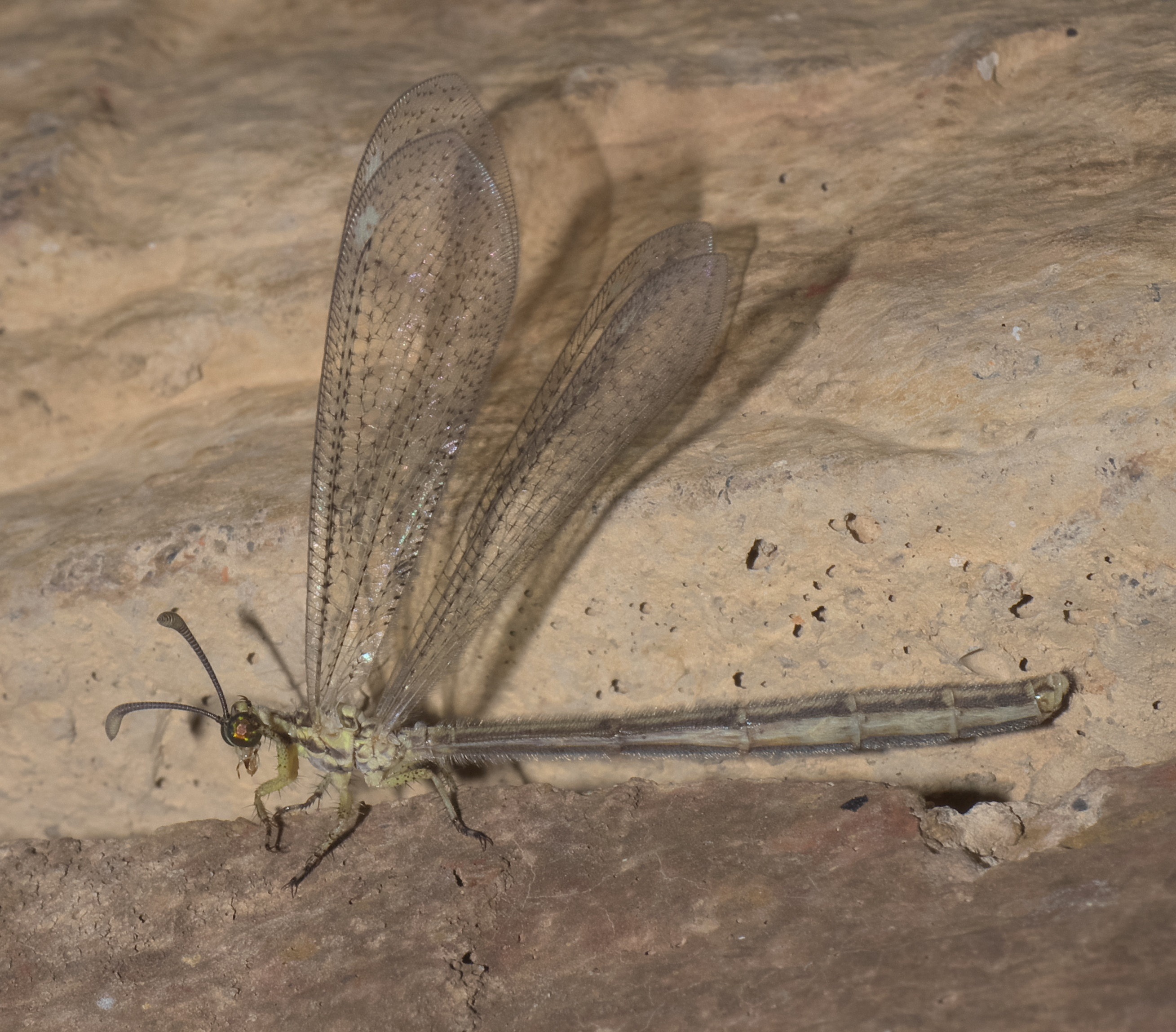
- Brachynemurus abdominalis

Scientific classification
- Domain: Eukaryota
- Kingdom: Animalia
- Phylum: Arthropoda
- Class: Insecta
- Order: Neuroptera
- Family: Myrmeleontidae
- Tribe: Brachynemurini
- Genus: Brachynemurus; Hagen, 1888

Synonyms
- Ameroleon Navás, 1926

= Brachynemurus =

Genus of insects

Brachynemurus is a genus of antlions in the family Myrmeleontidae. There are at least 20 described species in Brachynemurus.

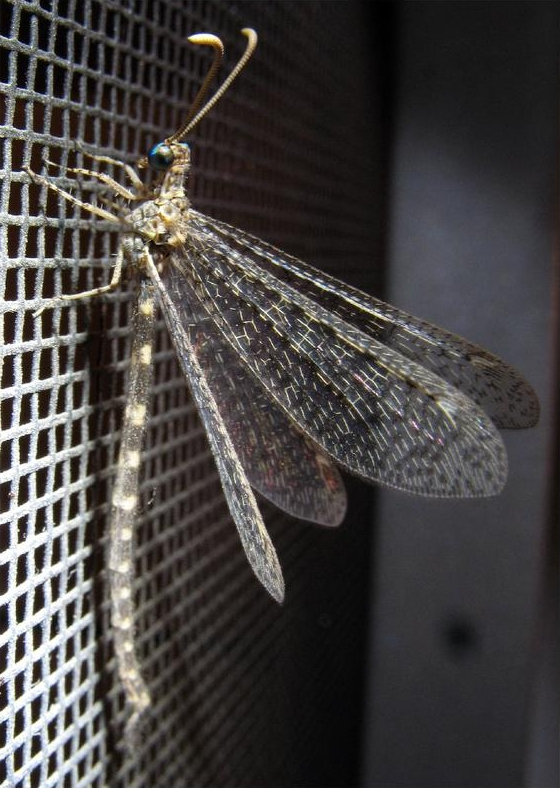
Brachynemurus sackeni

== Species ==
These 21 species belong to the genus Brachynemurus:

- Brachynemurus abdominalis (Say, 1823)^{i c g b}
- Brachynemurus blandus (Hagen, 1861)^{i c g}
- Brachynemurus californicus Banks, 1895^{i c g}
- Brachynemurus carolinus Banks, 1911^{i c g}
- Brachynemurus divisus (Navás, 1928)^{i c g}
- Brachynemurus elongatus Banks, 1904^{i c g}
- Brachynemurus exiguus (Navás, 1920)^{i c g}
- Brachynemurus ferox (Walker, 1853)^{i c g}
- Brachynemurus fuscus (Banks, 1905)^{i c g}
- Brachynemurus henshawi (Hagen, 1887)^{i c g}
- Brachynemurus hubbardii Currie, 1898^{i c g b}
- Brachynemurus irregularis Currie, 1906^{i c g}
- Brachynemurus longicaudus (Burmeister, 1839)^{i c g b}
- Brachynemurus mexicanus Banks, 1895^{i c g}
- Brachynemurus nebulosus (Olivier, 1811)^{i c g b}
- Brachynemurus pulchellus Banks, 1911^{i c g}
- Brachynemurus ramburi Banks, 1907^{i c g}
- Brachynemurus sackeni Hagen, 1888^{i c g b}
- Brachynemurus seminolae Stange, 1970^{i c g}
- Brachynemurus signatus (Hagen, 1887)^{i c g b}
- Brachynemurus versutus (Walker, 1853)^{i c g}

Data sources: i = ITIS, c = Catalogue of Life, g = GBIF, b = Bugguide.net
