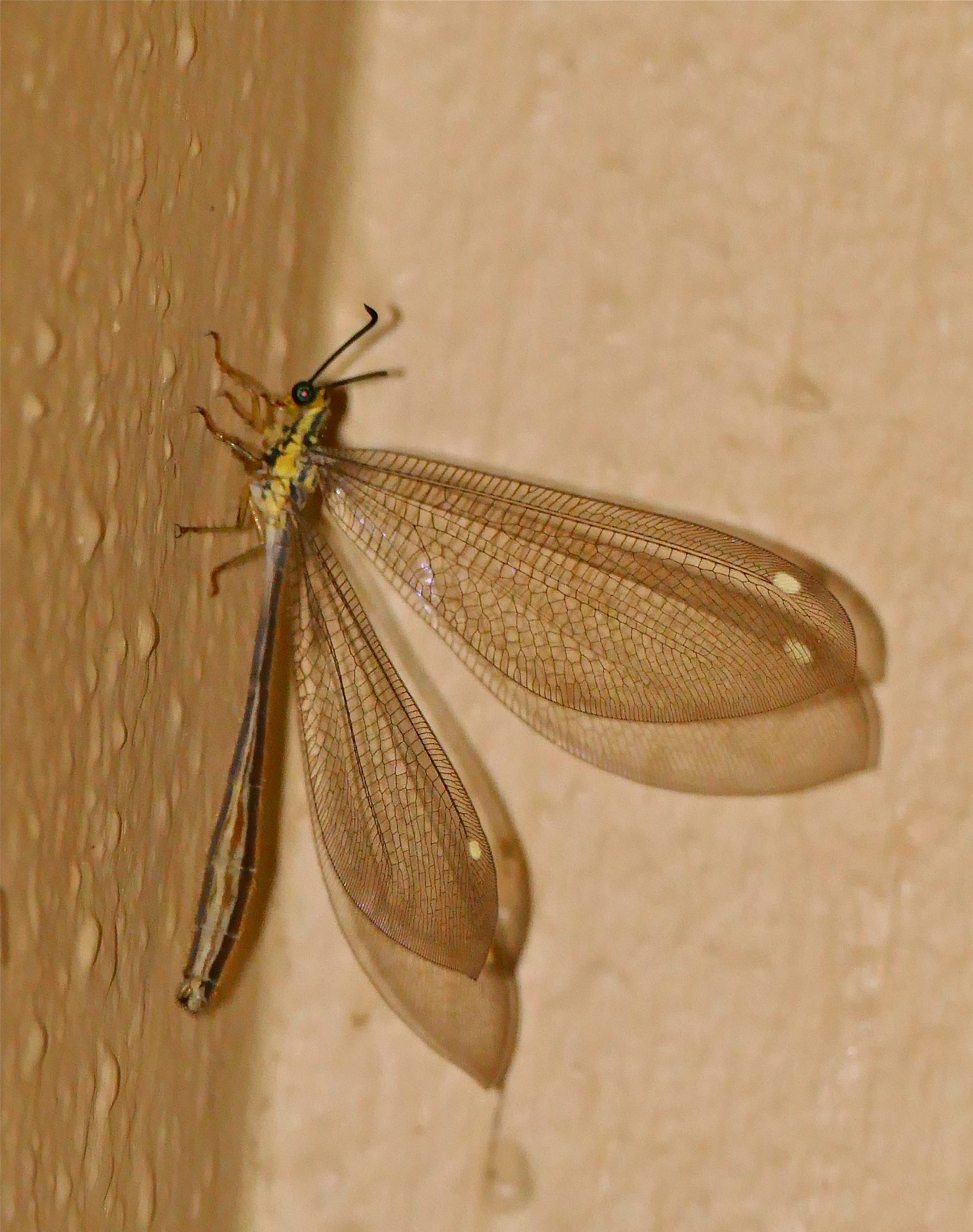
- Hagenomyia tristis

Scientific classification
- Kingdom: Animalia
- Phylum: Arthropoda
- Class: Insecta
- Order: Neuroptera
- Family: Myrmeleontidae
- Subfamily: Myrmeleontinae
- Tribe: Myrmeleontini
- Genus: Hagenomyia; Banks, 1911

= Hagenomyia =

Genus of insects

Hagenomyia is a genus of antlions (Myrmeleontidae) containing species occurring in Eastern Asia, tropical Africa and Australia.

== Species ==
The Global Biodiversity Information Facility lists:

1. Hagenomyia angustala Bao et al., 2007
2. Hagenomyia brunneipennis Esben-Petersen, 1913
3. Hagenomyia coalita (C.-k.Yang, 1999)
4. Hagenomyia conjuncta C.-k.Yang, 1999
5. Hagenomyia eurysticta (Gerstaecker, 1885)
6. Hagenomyia fuscithoraca C.-k.Yang, 1999
7. Hagenomyia guangxiensis Bao et al., 2007
8. Hagenomyia micans (McLachlan, 1875)
9. Hagenomyia posterior (Navás, 1931)
10. Hagenomyia sagax (Walker, 1853)
11. Hagenomyia sumatrensis (van der Weele, 1909)
12. Hagenomyia tristis (Walker, 1853)
