= Peruveleon =

Scientific classification
- Domain: Eukaryota
- Kingdom: Animalia
- Phylum: Arthropoda
- Class: Insecta
- Order: Neuroptera
- Family: Myrmeleontidae
- Tribe: Brachynemurini
- Genus: Peruveleon; Miller & Stange, 2011

Genus of insects

Peruveleon is a genus of antlions in the family Myrmeleontidae. There are about five described species in Peruveleon.

== Species ==
These five species belong to the genus Peruveleon:

- Peruveleon bruneri (Alayo, 1968)
- Peruveleon camposi (Banks, 1908)
- Peruveleon dolichogaster (Navás, 1915)
- Peruveleon dorsalis (Banks, 1903)
- Peruveleon indiges (Walker, 1860)
