= Maula stigmatus =

Scientific classification
- Kingdom: Animalia
- Phylum: Arthropoda
- Clade: Pancrustacea
- Class: Insecta
- Order: Neuroptera
- Family: Ascalaphidae
- Subfamily: Ascalaphinae
- Tribe: Palparini
- Genus: Maula; Navás, 1912
- Species: M. stigmatus

Binomial name
- Maula stigmatus Navás, 1912

Genus of insects

Maula is a genus of antlions found in Africa. It contains a single species, Maula stigmatus, described in 1912. This genus is classified in the tribe Palparini.
