= Newleon =

Scientific classification
- Domain: Eukaryota
- Kingdom: Animalia
- Phylum: Arthropoda
- Class: Insecta
- Order: Neuroptera
- Family: Myrmeleontidae
- Tribe: Dendroleontini
- Genus: Newleon; Miller & Stange, 2012

Genus of insects

Newleon is a genus of Australian, cave-dwelling antlions, that is, the genus belongs to the family Myrmeleontidae.

The genus was first described by Miller and Stange in 2012, who describe them as not being true cave-dwelling antlions, because not all life stages are confined to caves.

This genus consists of just one species, Newleon fragilis.
