= Pamexis =

Scientific classification
- Domain: Eukaryota
- Kingdom: Animalia
- Phylum: Arthropoda
- Class: Insecta
- Order: Neuroptera
- Family: Ascalaphidae
- Subfamily: Ascalaphinae
- Tribe: Palparini
- Genus: Pamexis; Hagen, 1866

Species
- See text

Genus of insects

Pamexis is a genus of antlions found in South Africa.

== Species ==
- Pamexis bifasciata (Olivier, 1811)
- Pamexis contaminata Hagen, 1887
- Pamexis hantam Mansell & Ball, 2016
- Pamexis karoo Mansell, 1992
- Pamexis lutea (Thunberg, 1784)
- Pamexis namaqua Mansell, 1992
