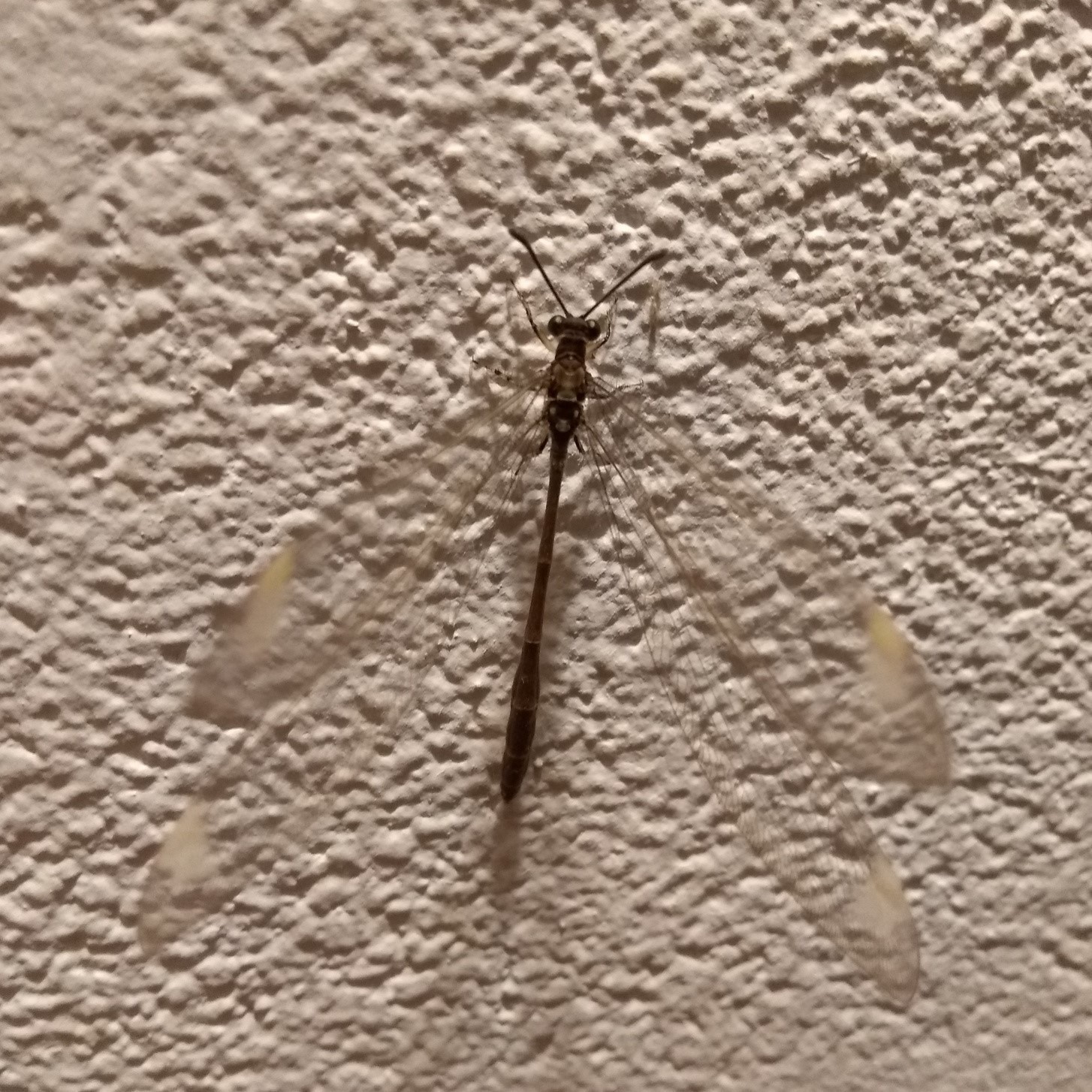

Scientific classification
- Domain: Eukaryota
- Kingdom: Animalia
- Phylum: Arthropoda
- Class: Insecta
- Order: Neuroptera
- Family: Myrmeleontidae
- Subfamily: Myrmeleontinae
- Tribe: Myrmeleontini
- Genus: Porrerus; Navás, 1913

= Porrerus =

Genus of insects

Porrerus is a genus of antlions belonging to the family Myrmeleontidae.

The species of this genus are found in South America and the Caribbean.

== Species ==
The following species are recognised in the genus Porrerus:

- Porrerus dealbatus (Navás, 1932)
- Porrerus dominicanus Poinar & Stange, 1996
- Porrerus famelicus Navás, 1913
