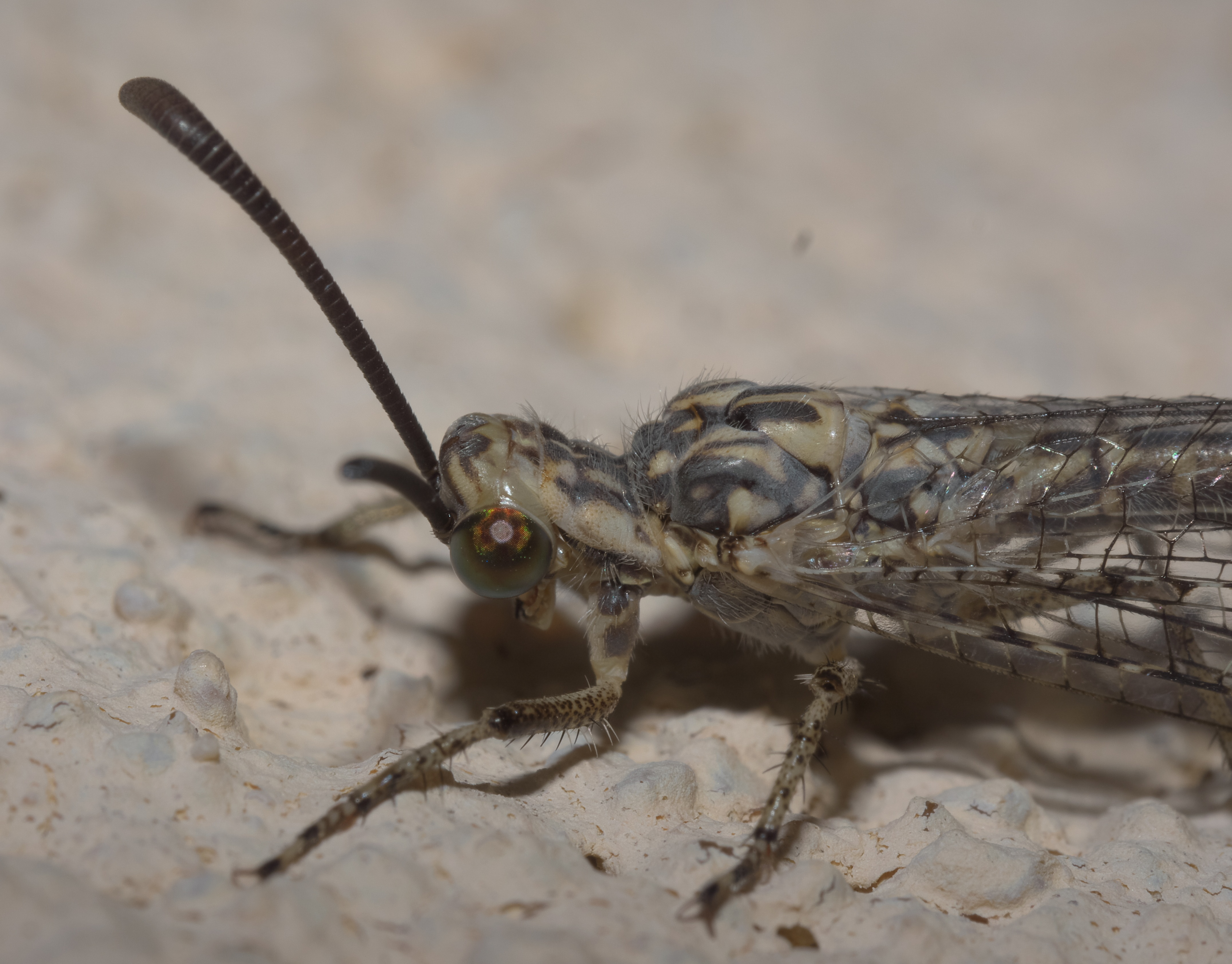
- Scotoleon carrizonus

Scientific classification
- Domain: Eukaryota
- Kingdom: Animalia
- Phylum: Arthropoda
- Class: Insecta
- Order: Neuroptera
- Family: Myrmeleontidae
- Tribe: Brachynemurini
- Genus: Scotoleon; Banks, 1913

= Scotoleon =

Genus of insects

Scotoleon is a genus of antlions in the family Myrmeleontidae. There are more than 20 described species in Scotoleon.

== Species ==
These 23 species belong to the genus Scotoleon:

- Scotoleon carrizonus (Hagen, 1888)
- Scotoleon deflexus (Adams, 1957)
- Scotoleon digueti (Navás, 1913)
- Scotoleon dissimilis (Banks, 1903)
- Scotoleon eiseni (Banks, 1908)
- Scotoleon expansus (Navás, 1913)
- Scotoleon fidelitas (Adams, 1957)
- Scotoleon infuscatus (Adams, 1957)
- Scotoleon intermedius (Currie, 1903)
- Scotoleon longipalpis (Hagen, 1888)
- Scotoleon marshi (Stange, 1970)
- Scotoleon minusculus (Banks, 1899)
- Scotoleon minutus (Adams, 1957)
- Scotoleon niger (Currie, 1898)
- Scotoleon nigrescens (Stange, 1970)
- Scotoleon nigrilabris (Hagen, 1888)
- Scotoleon nivatensis (Navás, 1915)
- Scotoleon pallidus (Banks, 1899)
- Scotoleon peninsulanus (Banks, 1942)
- Scotoleon peregrinus (Hagen, 1861)
- Scotoleon quadripunctatus (Currie, 1898)
- Scotoleon singularis (Currie, 1903)
- Scotoleon yavapai (Currie, 1903)
