= Weeleus =

Scientific classification
- Kingdom: Animalia
- Phylum: Arthropoda
- Class: Insecta
- Order: Neuroptera
- Family: Myrmeleontidae
- Subfamily: Nemoleontinae
- Tribe: Distoleontini
- Genus: Weeleus; Navás, 1912
- Species: W. acutus

Binomial name
- Weeleus acutus (Walker, 1853)

Synonyms
- Myrmeleon acutus Walker, 1853

Species of insect

Weeleus acutus is an antlion of the tribe Distoleontini, and the sole member of the genus Weeleus. It is endemic to New Zealand, and is widely distributed, being recorded from Kerikeri to Wakatipu. This species was first described by Francis Walker in 1853 from a specimen presented by Andrew Sinclair.

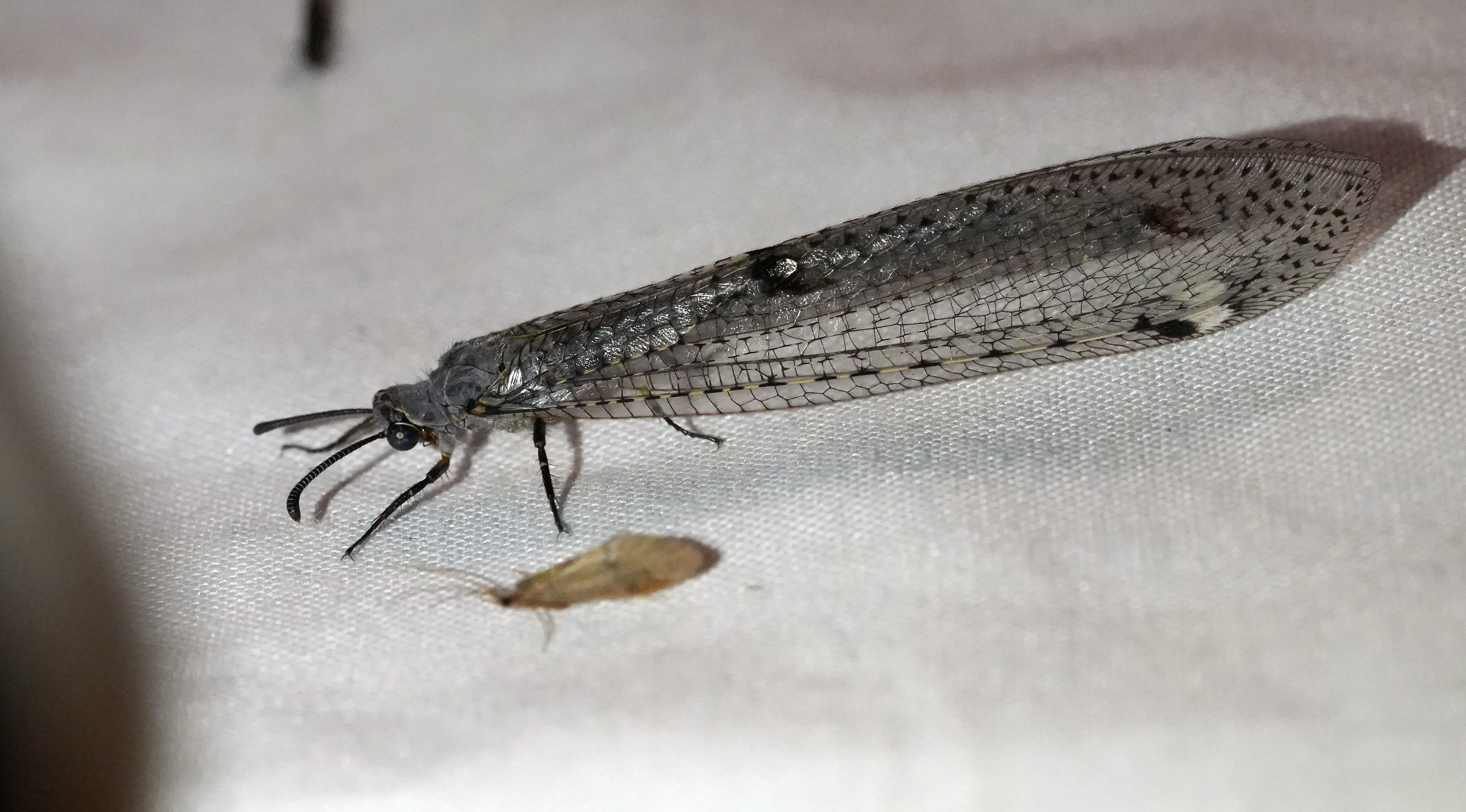
Weeleus acutus adult with closed wings at Boyle River, Canterbury. Attracted to light at night.
