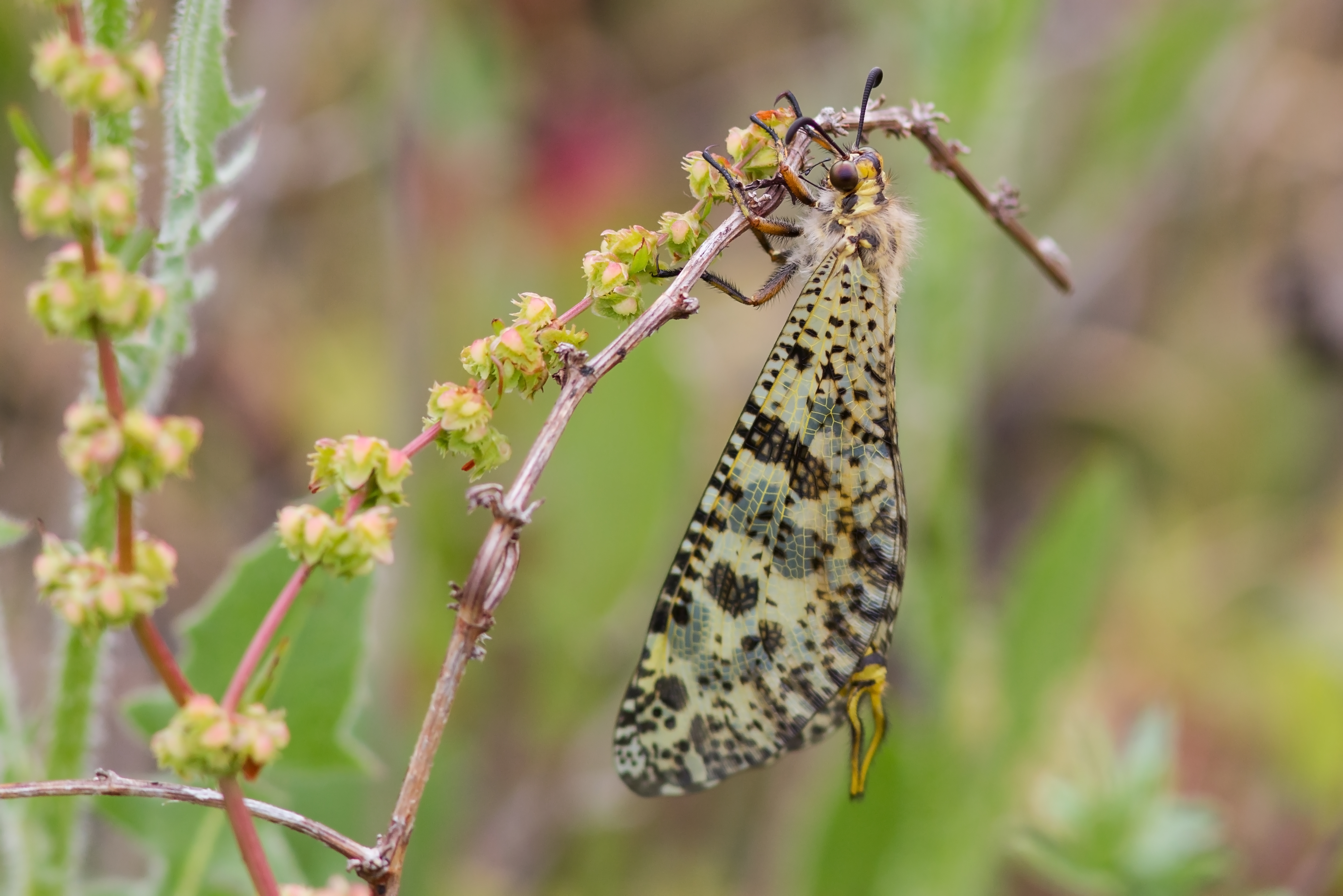
- Palpares libelluloides

Scientific classification
- Domain: Eukaryota
- Kingdom: Animalia
- Phylum: Arthropoda
- Class: Insecta
- Order: Neuroptera
- Family: Ascalaphidae
- Subfamily: Ascalaphinae
- Tribe: Palparini; Banks, 1911

Genera
- 19 genera (see text)

= Palparini =

Tribe of insects

Palparini is an antlion tribe in the subfamily Palparinae.

== Genera ==
19 genera belong to tribe Palparini:

- Crambomorphus McLachlan, 1867
- Golafrus Navás, 1912
- Goniocercus Insom & Carfi, 1988
- Indopalpares Insom & Carfi, 1988
- Isonemurus Esben-Petersen 1928
- Lachlathetes Navás, 1926
- Maula Navás, 1912
- Nosa Navás, 1911
- Palparellus Navás, 1912
- Palpares Rambur, 1842
- Palparidius Péringuey, 1910
- Pamares Mansell, 1990
- Pamexis Hagen, 1866
- Parapalpares Insom & Carfi, 1988
- Pseudopalpares Insom & Carfi, 1988
- Stenares Hagen, 1866
- Tomatarella Kimmins, 1952
- Tomatares Hagen, 1866
- Valignanus Navás, 1913
