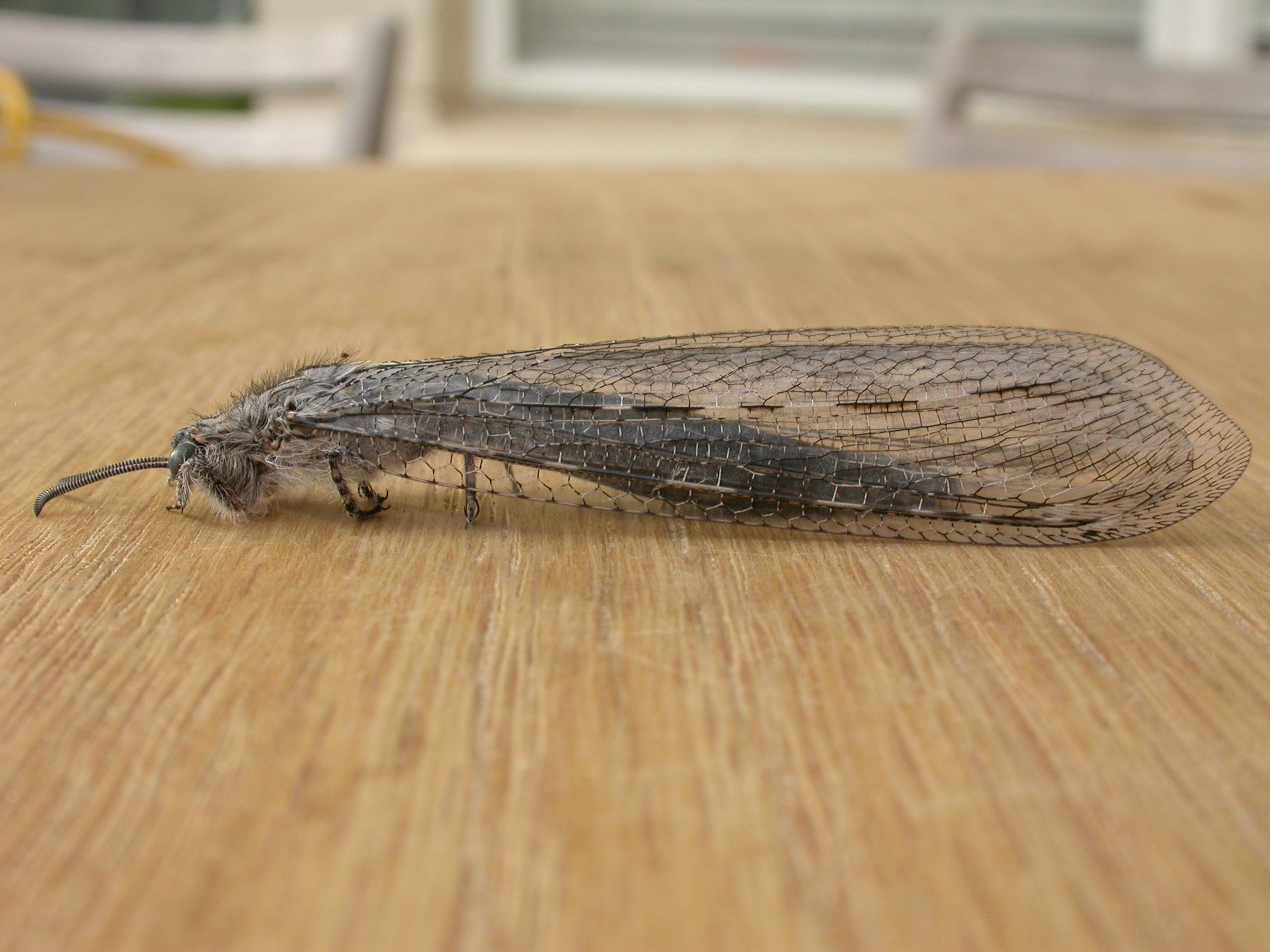
- Heoclisis fundata

Scientific classification
- Domain: Eukaryota
- Kingdom: Animalia
- Phylum: Arthropoda
- Class: Insecta
- Order: Neuroptera
- Family: Myrmeleontidae
- Genus: Heoclisis; Navás, 1923

= Heoclisis =

Genus of insects

Heoclisis is a genus of cave-dwelling antlions, that is, insects in the family Myrmeleontidae.

The genus was first described by Longinos Navás in 1923.

Miller and Stange (2012) describe them as not being true cave-dwelling antlions, because not all life stages are confined to caves.

== Species ==
These species belong to the genus Heoclisis:

- Heoclisis acuta (Kimmins, 1939)
- Heoclisis angustipennis New, 1985
- Heoclisis conspurcata (Gerstaecker, 1885)
- Heoclisis fulva (Esben-Petersen, 1912)
- Heoclisis fulvifusa (Kimmins, 1939)
- Heoclisis fundata (Walker, 1853)
- Heoclisis japonica (Hagen, 1866)
- Heoclisis louiseae Banks, 1938
- Heoclisis ramosa New, 1985
- Heoclisis sinensis Navás, 1923
- Heoclisis tillyardi (Kimmins, 1939)
