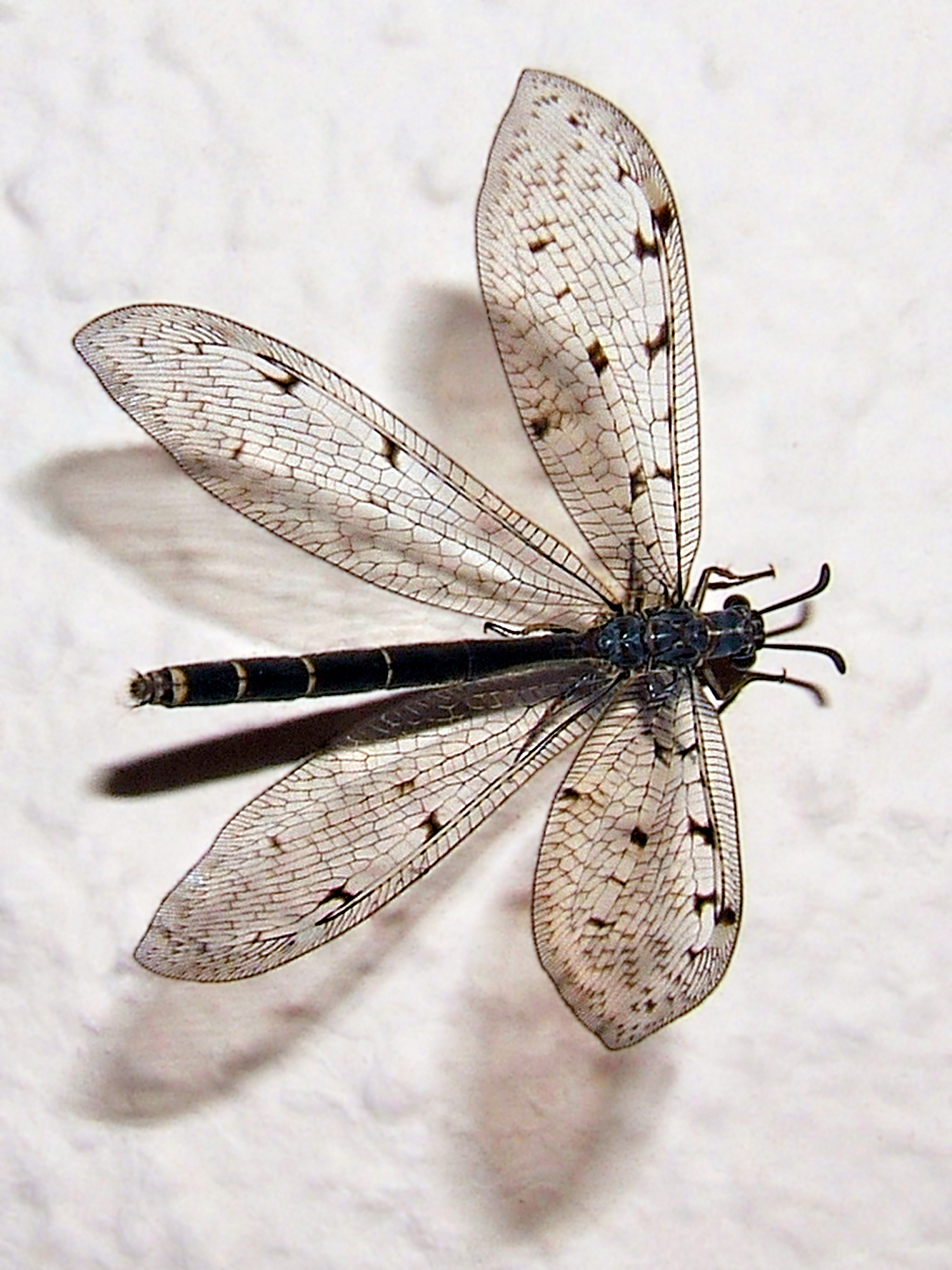
- Euroleon nostras

Scientific classification
- Kingdom: Animalia
- Phylum: Arthropoda
- Class: Insecta
- Order: Neuroptera
- Family: Myrmeleontidae
- Subfamily: Myrmeleontinae; Latreille, 1802

= Myrmeleontinae =

Subfamily of insects

Myrmeleontinae is a subfamily of Myrmeleontidae, the antlions.

== Tribes and Genera ==
BioLib includes 3 tribes:

Maulini Markl, 1954

1. Isonemurus Esben-Petersen, 1928
2. Maula - monotypic Maula stigmatus Navás, 1912

Myrmeleontini Latreille, 1802

Selected genera:

- Euroleon Esben-Petersen, 1918
- Hagenomyia Banks, 1911
- Myrmeleon Linnaeus, 1767

Porrerini Navas, 1913

- monotypic tribe: Porrerus Navás, 1913
