= Mallada (disambiguation) =

Mallada is a genus of lacewings.

Mallada may also refer to:

- Mallada basalis, a species of mallada
- Esmeralda Mallada (born 1937), Uruguayan astronomer
  - 16277 Mallada, an asteroid named after the astronomer
- Teresa Mallada (born 1973), Spanish engineer and politician
- Avelino González Mallada (1894–1938), Spanish anarchist
