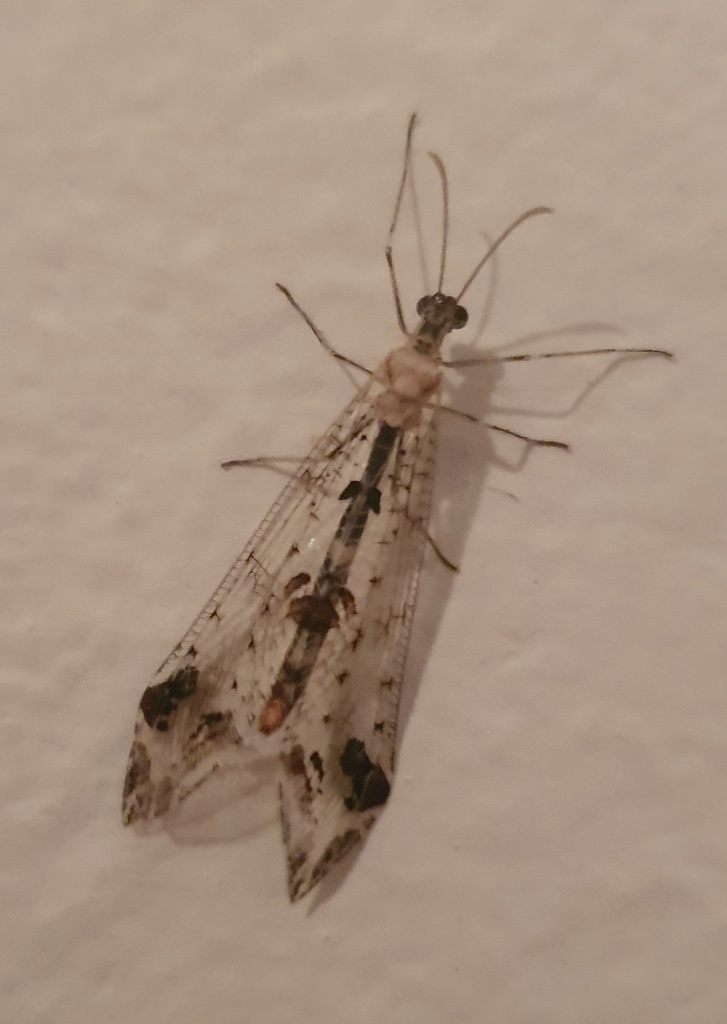
- Bankisus oculatus

Scientific classification
- Domain: Eukaryota
- Kingdom: Animalia
- Phylum: Arthropoda
- Class: Insecta
- Order: Neuroptera
- Family: Myrmeleontidae
- Subfamily: Dendroleontinae
- Tribe: Dendroleontini
- Genus: Bankisus; Navás, 1912

= Bankisus =

Genus of insects

Bankisus is a genus of antlions belonging to the family Myrmeleontidae.

The species of this genus are found in southern Africa.

Species:

- Bankisus antiatlasensis Ábrahám, 2009
- Bankisus carinifrons (Esben-Petersen, 1936)
- Bankisus elegantulus (Esben-Petersen, 1936)
- Bankisus maculosus Hölzel, 1983
- Bankisus oculatus Navás, 1912
- Bankisus sparsus Zhan & Wang, 2012
- Bankisus triguttatus Navás, 1926
