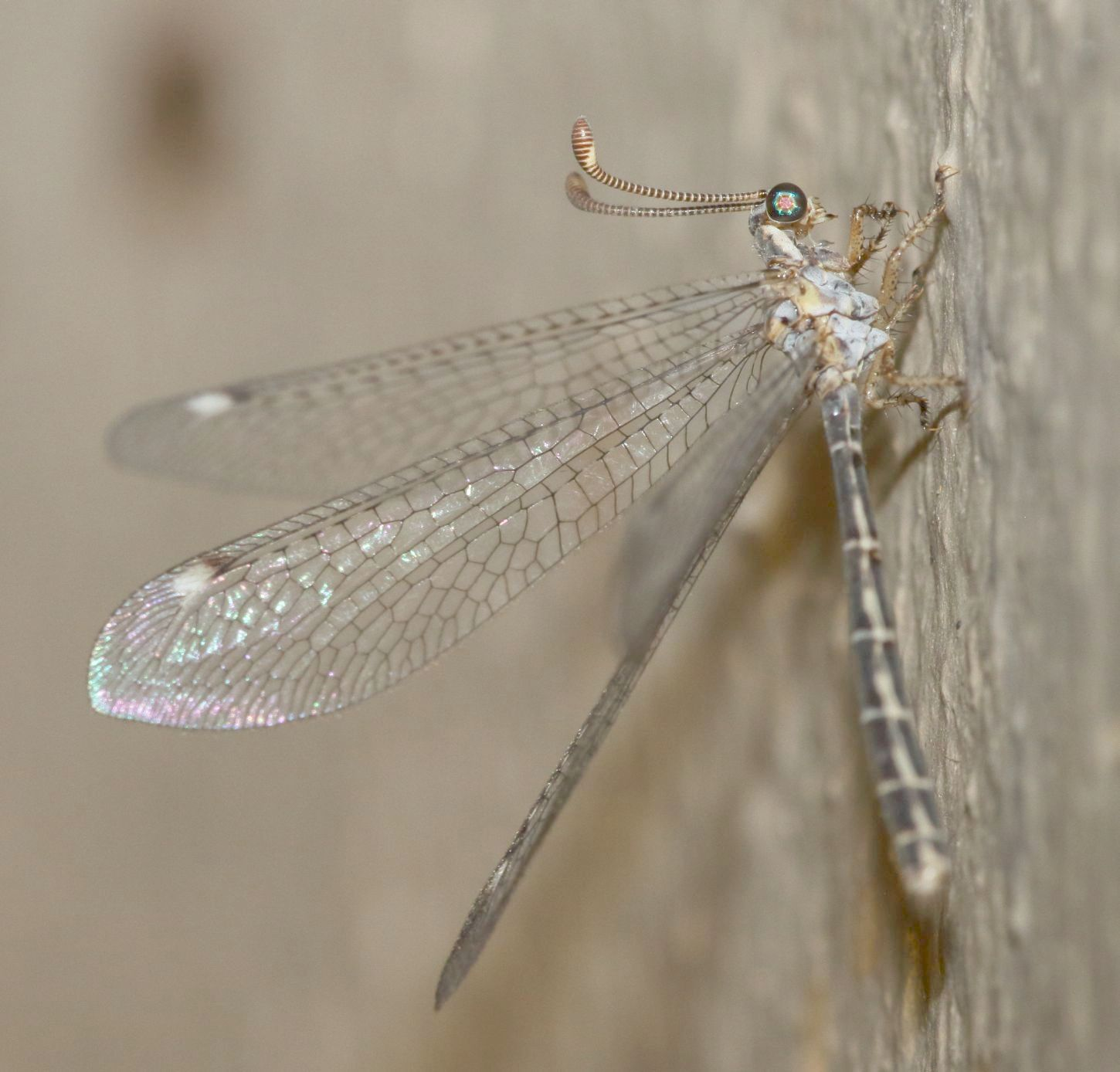
- Nannoleon michaelseni

Scientific classification
- Domain: Eukaryota
- Kingdom: Animalia
- Phylum: Arthropoda
- Class: Insecta
- Order: Neuroptera
- Family: Myrmeleontidae
- Subfamily: Dendroleontinae
- Tribe: Dendroleontini
- Genus: Nannoleon; Esben-Petersen, 1928
- Species: N. michaelseni

Binomial name
- Nannoleon michaelseni Esben-Petersen, 1928

= Nannoleon =

Genus of insects

Nannoleon is a genus of antlions in the insect family Myrmeleontidae in the order Neuroptera. It comprises a single species, Nannoleon michaelseni, which is found in Namibia and South Africa.
