= Bullanga =

Scientific classification
- Kingdom: Animalia
- Phylum: Arthropoda
- Clade: Pancrustacea
- Class: Insecta
- Order: Neuroptera
- Family: Myrmeleontidae
- Subfamily: Dendroleontinae
- Tribe: Dendroleontini
- Genus: Bullanga; Navás, 1917

Genus of insects

Bullanga is a genus of antlions belonging to the family Myrmeleontidae.

Species:

- Bullanga binaria Navás, 1917
- Bullanga florida (Navás, 1913)
- Bullanga insolita (Banks, 1940)
