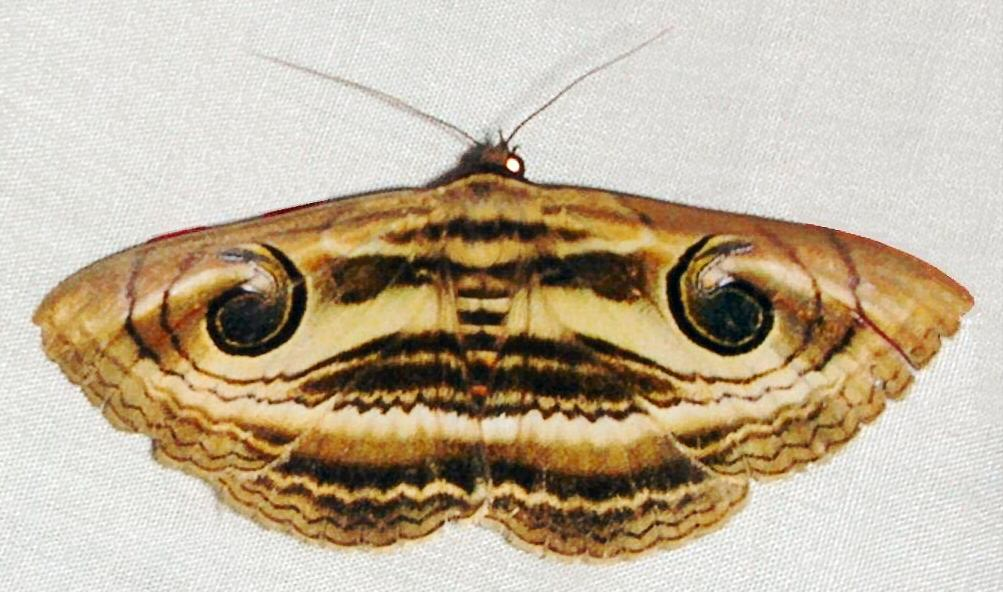
- From Ratchaburi Province, Western Thailand

Scientific classification
- Kingdom: Animalia
- Phylum: Arthropoda
- Clade: Pancrustacea
- Class: Insecta
- Order: Lepidoptera
- Superfamily: Noctuoidea
- Family: Erebidae
- Genus: Spirama
- Species: S. helicina

Binomial name
- Spirama helicina (Hübner, 1824)

Synonyms
- Speiredonia helicina Hübner, 1824; Speiredonia japonica Guenée, 1852; Spirama japonica; Spirama aegrota Butler, 1881

= Spirama helicina =

Species of moth

Spirama helicina is a moth of the family Erebidae first described by Jacob Hübner in 1824. In older texts, the species was classified as morph of Spirama retorta.

== Description ==
The wingspan is 60–70 mm. As in many species of genus Spirama, the pattern on the wings when the moth is resting looks like the face of a snake with slightly opened mouth. Forewings with arched costa towards apex, which is nearly rectangular. Male with a fold on inner area of hindwings, containing an erectile ridge of very long hair. Antennae fasciculate. Very similar to S. retorta, but differs from more brightly colored than that species. Female with ochreous sub-marginal line of hindwings crenulate. Male has dark chestnut brown head and collar. Thorax paler with dark bands. Abdomen crimson with triangular black dorsal patches. Wings fuscous brown. A large "inverted comma" mark found beyond end of cell, with ochreous and black edges and some white on inner edge of "tail", the center fuscous black.

== Distribution ==
It is found in Russia (south-eastern Siberia, Ussuri, Primorye), China (Sichuan, Yunnan), Taiwan, Korea, Japan (Honshu, Kyushu), India (Assam, Meghalaya, Orissa, West Bengal), Nepal, Thailand, Malaysia, Laos, Vietnam, Sri Lanka, the Philippines (Negros), Java, Sumatra and Sulawesi.

== Sexual dimorphism ==
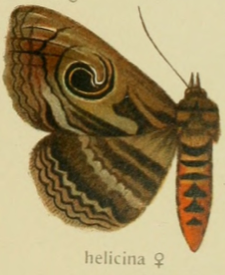
Female

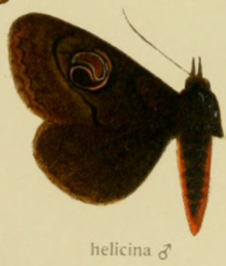
Male

== Speiredonia japonica ==
Although Speiredonia japonica is an accepted synonym of Spirama helicina, the Speiredonia japonica exemplars in Plate CCXI of the Catalogue of the Noctuidae in the Collection of the British Museum illustrated by Sir George F. Hampson at the turn of the 20th century have a markedly different pattern.

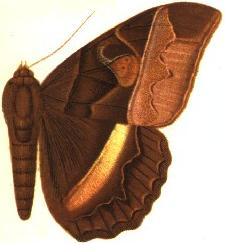
Speiredonia japonica female. Illustrated by George Hampson (1903-1913)

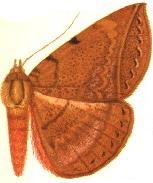
Speiredonia japonica male. Illustrated by George Hampson
