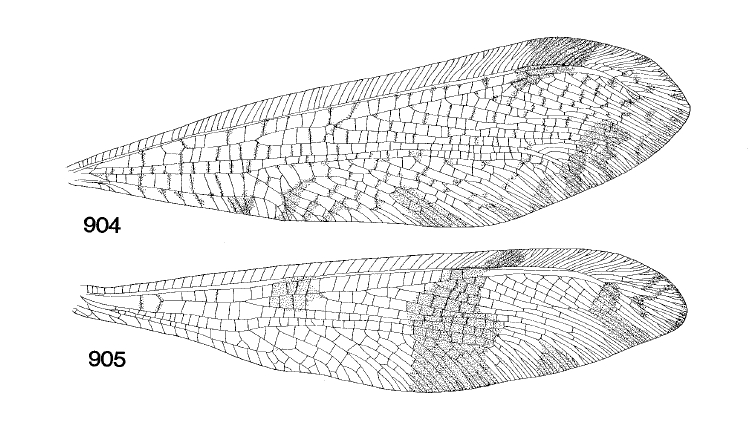

Scientific classification
- Domain: Eukaryota
- Kingdom: Animalia
- Phylum: Arthropoda
- Class: Insecta
- Order: Neuroptera
- Family: Myrmeleontidae
- Genus: Froggattisca
- Species: F. pulchella

Binomial name
- Froggattisca pulchella Esben-Petersen, 1915

= Froggattisca pulchella =

Species of insects

Froggattisca pulchella is a species of antlion (or Myrmeleontidae), endemic to the Australian states of New South Wales and Queensland.

The species was first described in 1915 by Peter Esben-Petersen.

== Description ==
Esben-Petersen describes the species from an adult female specimen as:

Froggattisca pulchella, sp.nov.
Face and palpi yellowish; above the antennae, a blackish-brown transverse band proceeding between the antennae as a V-shaped spot. Above the transverse blackish streak, a narrow yellowish one. Vertex somewhat raised, bronze-brown. Eyes greenish, metallic, shining. Antennae blackish-brown, the club blackish; two joints before the club very pale, nearly white. Prothorax reddish-brown, longer than broad, narrowed in front, and with rounded front angles. One-third from the front margin, a transverse impression. Meso- and metathorax greyish-brown, with narrow, whitish, hind margins. Abdomen reddish-brown, becoming blackish-brown tovvards apex. Fore and intermediate legs blackish-brown, hind femur brown, with a broad blackish band in its middle, and a narrower one at the tip; hind tibiae brown, with a blackish band near base and at tip; hind tarsus blackish, first joint brown at base. All the claws yellowish. Body and legs with soft pilosity. Wings hyaline, with brownish tinge in the disc, and sooty-brown markings. Longitudinal nervures mostly yellowish; the greatest number of crossveins in the fore wings strongly sooty-brown shaded. Length of forewing, 35 mm.; of hind wing, 35 mm.

Colo Yale, N.S.W.; one female; 20.iv.1900; W. W. Froggatt
