= Froggattisca testacea =

Scientific classification
- Domain: Eukaryota
- Kingdom: Animalia
- Phylum: Arthropoda
- Class: Insecta
- Order: Neuroptera
- Family: Myrmeleontidae
- Genus: Froggattisca
- Species: F. testacea

Binomial name
- Froggattisca testacea (Esben-Petersen, 1923)

Species of insects

Froggattisca testacea is a species of cave-dwelling antlion (or Myrmeleontidae), endemic to the Northern Territory.

The species was first described as Adeloplectron testaceum in 1923 by Peter Esben-Petersen, but was transferred to the genus, Froggattisca by Lionel Alvin Stange in 1976.

Miller and Stange describe this species (and all Froggattisca species) as not being a true cave-dwelling antlion, because not all life stages are confined to caves. The larvae of this species live in "recessed, slightly rain-protected abandoned termite galleries of termite mounds".
