= Spirama euspira =

Scientific classification
- Kingdom: Animalia
- Phylum: Arthropoda
- Clade: Pancrustacea
- Class: Insecta
- Order: Lepidoptera
- Superfamily: Noctuoidea
- Family: Erebidae
- Genus: Spirama
- Species: S. euspira

Binomial name
- Spirama euspira (Hübner, [1823])

Synonyms
- Speiredonia euspira Hübner, [1823]; Speiredonia cuspira

Species of moth

Spirama euspira is a species of moth of the family Erebidae. It was apparently proposed as a name for what Cramer misidentified as Spirama retorta in 1780. However, the identity of this species is unknown.
