= Froggattisca =

Scientific classification
- Domain: Eukaryota
- Kingdom: Animalia
- Phylum: Arthropoda
- Class: Insecta
- Order: Neuroptera
- Family: Myrmeleontidae
- Tribe: Dendroleontini
- Genus: Froggattisca; Esben-Petersen, 1915

Genus of insects

Froggattisca is a genus of cave-dwelling antlions, that is, the genus belongs to the family Myrmeleontidae.

The genus was first described by Peter Esben-Petersen in 1915. The genus name honours W.W. Froggatt who, in 1900 at Colo Vale, NSW, collected the female specimen described by Esben-Petersen as Froggattisca pulchella.

Miller and Stange describe members of the genus as not being true cave-dwelling antlions, because not all life stages are confined to caves. The genus is found only in Australia. Froggattisca larvae are found on the floors of cave mouths in shallow dust or loose material.

This genus consists of approximately nine species:

- Froggattisca anicis New, 1985
- Froggattisca gemma New, 1985
- Froggattisca kakadu Miller and Stange, 2012
- Froggattisca pulchella Esben-Petersen, 1915
- Froggattisca radiostriata New, 1985
- Froggattisca rennerensis Miller and Stange, 2012
- Froggattisca rieki New, 1985
- Froggattisca testacea (Esben-Petersen, 1923)
- Froggattisca tipularia (Gerstaecker, 1885)

== Description ==
Froggattisca species have:

1. larvae whose
  1. pretarsal claws close against the ventral setae;
  2. tibial spurs are absent or very short;
2. adults whose
  1. hindwings have one or two presectoral crossveins;
  2. hind femurs with no elongated sensing hair.
