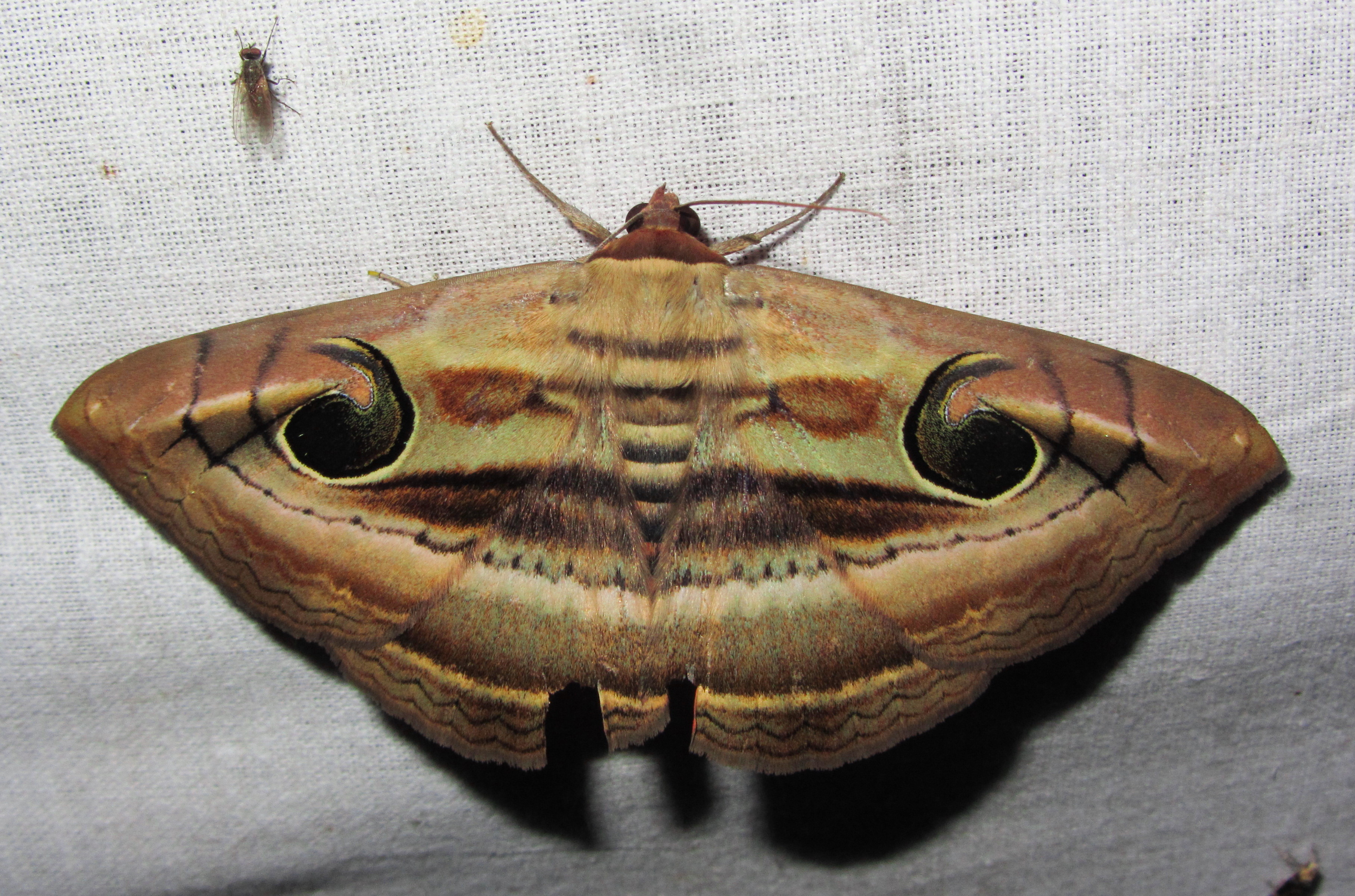
- Spirama indenta, or a closely related species

Scientific classification
- Kingdom: Animalia
- Phylum: Arthropoda
- Class: Insecta
- Order: Lepidoptera
- Superfamily: Noctuoidea
- Family: Erebidae
- Genus: Spirama
- Species: S. indenta

Binomial name
- Spirama indenta Hampson, 1891

Synonyms
- Spirama indentata

= Spirama indenta =

Species of moth

Spirama indenta is a species of moth of the family Erebidae first described by George Hampson in 1891. It is found from the Indian states of Assam and Meghalaya and from Sri Lanka to Java in Indonesia. In older texts, the species was classified as a morph of Spirama retorta.

== Description ==
The pattern on the wings looks like the face of a snake with slightly opened mouth. Forewings with arched costa towards nearly rectangular apex. Male with a fold on inner area of hindwings, containing an erectile ridge of very long hair. Antennae fasciculate (bundled). Male has a chestnut-brown head and collar. Thorax paler with dark bands. Abdomen crimson with triangular black dorsal patches. Wings fuscous brown. An "inverted comma" mark can be found beyond end of cell, with ochreous and black edges and some white on inner edge of "tail", the centre fuscous black. Markings are not prominent. The stigma reduced in size and with two indentations in its outer edge. Forewings suffused with olive and vinous. Female has ochreous body and non-crenulate sub-marginal line on hindwings.
