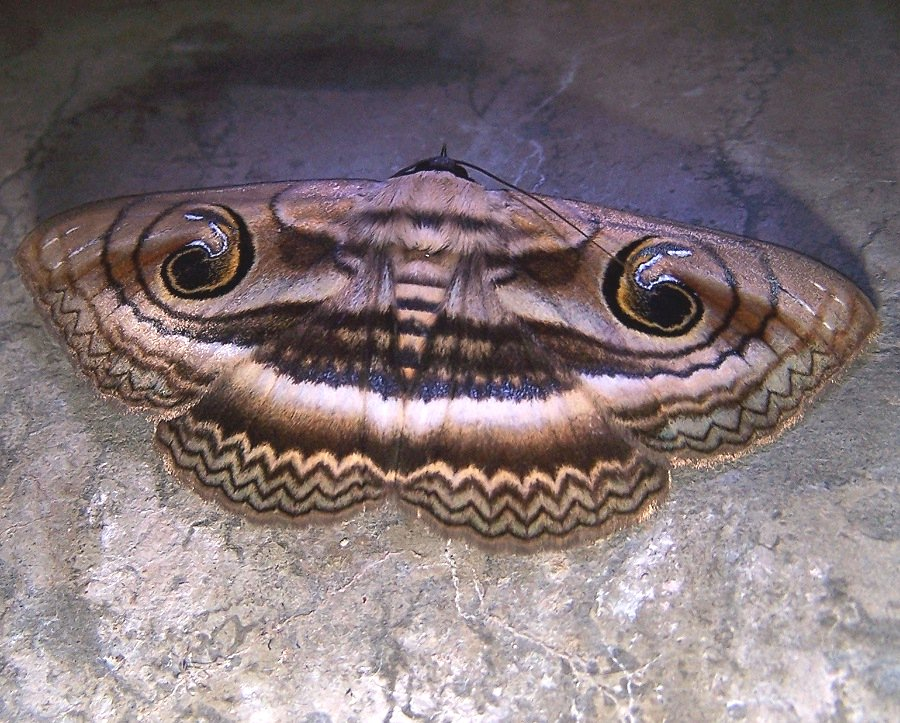

Scientific classification
- Kingdom: Animalia
- Phylum: Arthropoda
- Class: Insecta
- Order: Lepidoptera
- Superfamily: Noctuoidea
- Family: Erebidae
- Genus: Spirama
- Species: S. recessa

Binomial name
- Spirama recessa (Walker, 1858)

Synonyms
- Speiredonia recessa Walker, 1858; Spiramia revolvens Walker 1858; Speiredonia revolvens

= Spirama recessa =

Species of moth

Spirama recessa is a moth of the family Erebidae. It is found in New Guinea and tropical northern Australia.

The wingspan is about 50 mm. The pattern on the wings looks like the face of a snake with slightly opened mouth.

== Gallery ==
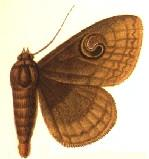
Spirama recessa male

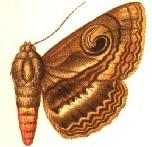
Spirama recessa female
