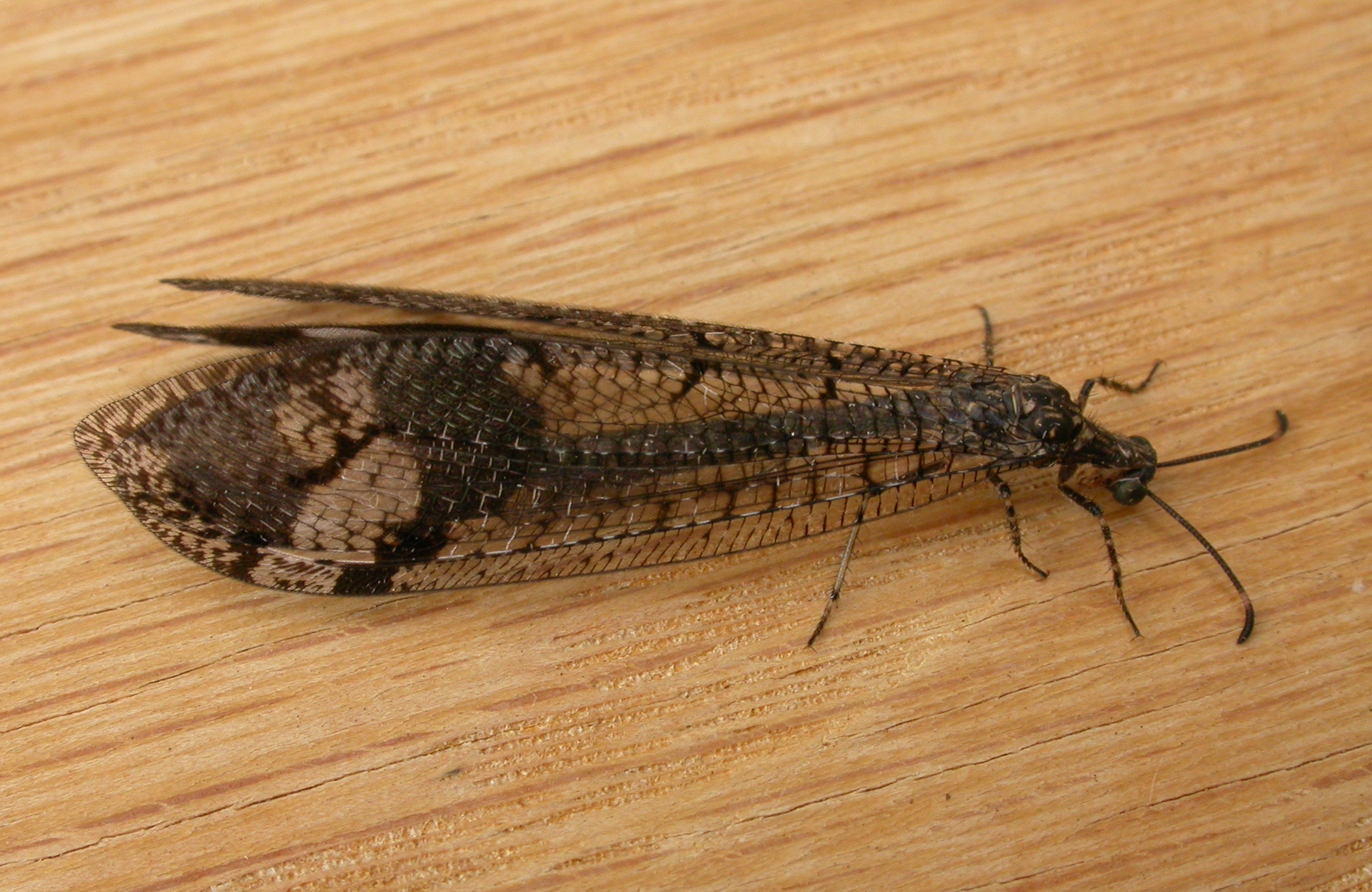
- Glenoleon pulchellus

Scientific classification
- Domain: Eukaryota
- Kingdom: Animalia
- Phylum: Arthropoda
- Class: Insecta
- Order: Neuroptera
- Family: Myrmeleontidae
- Subfamily: Dendroleontinae
- Tribe: Dendroleontini
- Genus: Glenoleon; Banks 1913

= Glenoleon =

Genus of insects

Glenoleon is a genus of antlions in the insect family Myrmeleontidae in the order Neuroptera. There are 32 species.

== Species ==
- Glenoleon annulatus Esben-Petersen, 1918
- Glenoleon aurora Tillyard, 1916
- Glenoleon banksi New, 1985
- Glenoleon berthoudi Tillyard, 1916
- Glenoleon brevigonarcus New, 1985
- Glenoleon cahillensis New, 1985
- Glenoleon conspersus Banks, 1918
- Glenoleon dannyae New, 1985
- Glenoleon dissolutus (Gerstaecker, 1885)
- Glenoleon drysdalensis New, 1985
- Glenoleon falsus (Walker, 1853)
- Glenoleon gerstaeckeri New, 1985
- Glenoleon lesouefi New, 1985
- Glenoleon maculatus New, 1985
- Glenoleon mcalpinei New, 1985
- Glenoleon meteoricus (Gerstaecker, 1885)
- Glenoleon minutillus New, 1985
- Glenoleon mouldsorum New, 1985
- Glenoleon mulesi New, 1985
- Glenoleon nigristriatus New, 1985
- Glenoleon osmyloides (Gerstaecker, 1885)
- Glenoleon parviproctus New, 1985
- Glenoleon pictus New, 1985
- Glenoleon pingrupensis New, 1985
- Glenoleon pulchellus (Rambur, 1842)
- Glenoleon radialis Banks, 1913
- Glenoleon roseipennis Tillyard, 1916
- Glenoleon rudda New, 1985
- Glenoleon secula New, 1985
- Glenoleon stigmatus (Banks, 1910)
- Glenoleon tergitus New, 1985
- Glenoleon tillyardi New, 1985
