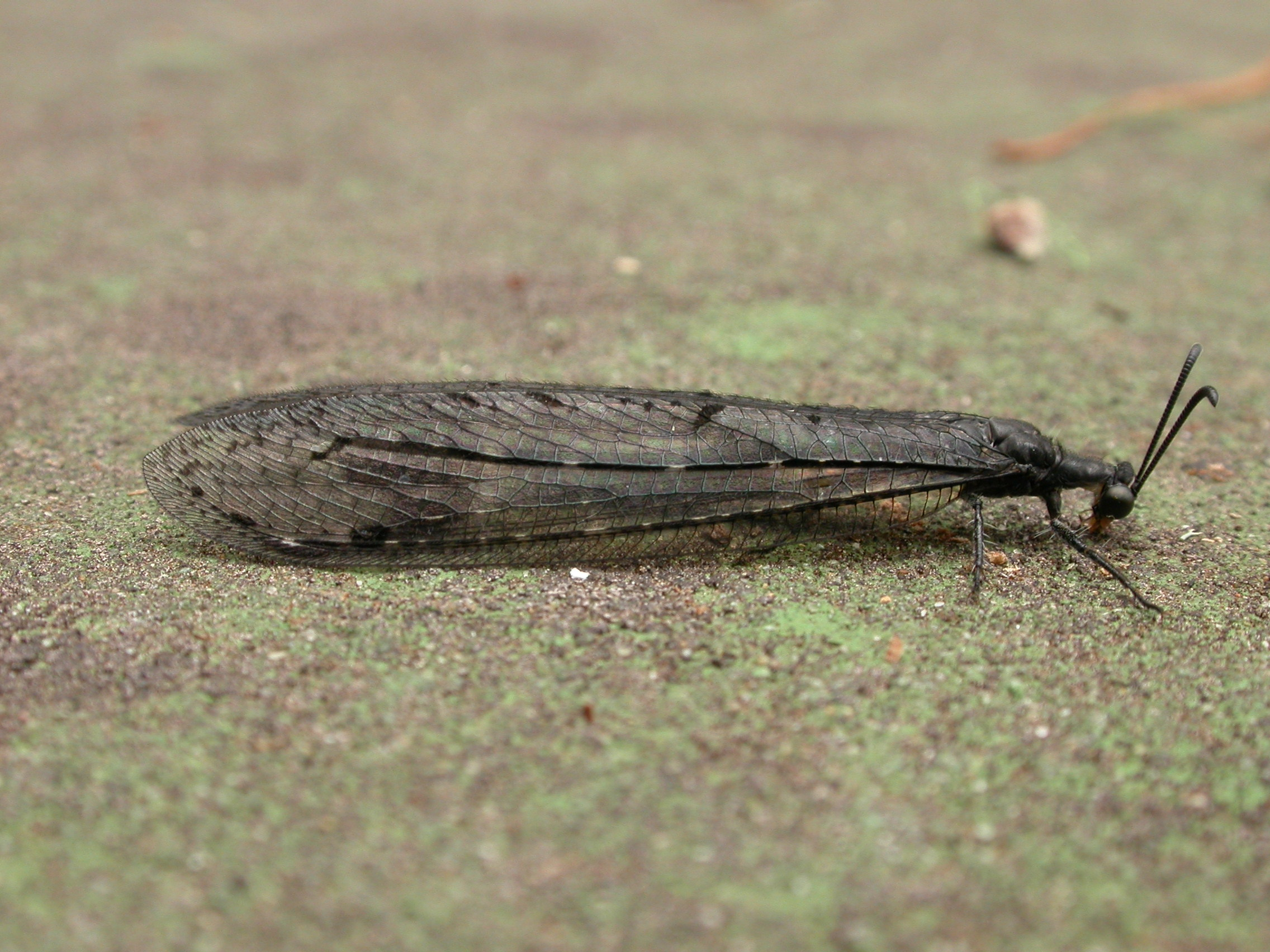

Scientific classification
- Kingdom: Animalia
- Phylum: Arthropoda
- Class: Insecta
- Order: Neuroptera
- Family: Myrmeleontidae
- Genus: Glenoleon
- Species: G. falsus

Binomial name
- Glenoleon falsus (Walker, 1853)

= Glenoleon falsus =

Species of insect

Glenoleon falsus is a species of antlion that occurs in Australia.
