= Spirama triloba =

Scientific classification
- Kingdom: Animalia
- Phylum: Arthropoda
- Class: Insecta
- Order: Lepidoptera
- Superfamily: Noctuoidea
- Family: Erebidae
- Genus: Spirama
- Species: S. triloba

Binomial name
- Spirama triloba Guenée, 1852

Synonyms
- Spirama confusa Butler, 1889; Spirama modesta Moore, 1882; Hypopyra mollis Guenée, 1852; Spirama rosacea Butler, 1889

Species of moth

Spirama triloba is a species of moth of the family Erebidae. It is found in northern India (Himachal Pradesh, West Bengal, Darjeeling), Bangladesh, Cambodia, the Philippines and Indonesia (Java, Sulawesi).
