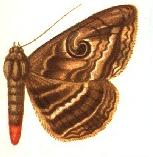
- Female
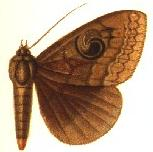
- Male

Scientific classification
- Kingdom: Animalia
- Phylum: Arthropoda
- Clade: Pancrustacea
- Class: Insecta
- Order: Lepidoptera
- Superfamily: Noctuoidea
- Family: Erebidae
- Genus: Spirama
- Species: S. sumbana

Binomial name
- Spirama sumbana Swinhoe, 1904

Synonyms
- Speiredonia sumbana

= Spirama sumbana =

Species of moth

Spirama sumbana is a species of moth of the family Erebidae. It is found on the Indonesian island of Sumba.
