= Spirama biformis =

Scientific classification
- Kingdom: Animalia
- Phylum: Arthropoda
- Class: Insecta
- Order: Lepidoptera
- Superfamily: Noctuoidea
- Family: Erebidae
- Genus: Spirama
- Species: S. biformis

Binomial name
- Spirama biformis (Hulstaert, 1924)

Synonyms
- Speiredonia biformis Hulstaert, 1924; Speiredonia tenimberensis Hulstaert, 1924

Species of moth

Spirama biformis is a species of moth of the family Erebidae. It is found in Indonesia (Moluccas).
