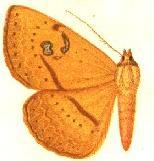

Scientific classification
- Kingdom: Animalia
- Phylum: Arthropoda
- Class: Insecta
- Order: Lepidoptera
- Superfamily: Noctuoidea
- Family: Erebidae
- Genus: Spirama
- Species: S. griseisigma

Binomial name
- Spirama griseisigma (Hampson, 1913)

Synonyms
- Speiredonia griseisigna Hampson, 1913

= Spirama griseisigma =

Species of moth

Spirama griseisigma is a moth of the family Erebidae. It is found in Africa, including Zimbabwe.
