= Froggattisca kakadu =

Scientific classification
- Domain: Eukaryota
- Kingdom: Animalia
- Phylum: Arthropoda
- Class: Insecta
- Order: Neuroptera
- Family: Myrmeleontidae
- Genus: Froggattisca
- Species: F. kakadu

Binomial name
- Froggattisca kakadu Miller & Stange, 2012

Species of insect

Froggattisca kakadu is a species of cave-dwelling antlions (or Myrmeleontidae).

The genus was first described by Miller and Stange in 2012.

Miller and Stange describe members of the genus as not being true cave-dwelling antlions, because not all life stages are confined to caves. The genus is found only in Australia.

== Description ==
The larvae have head capsules with prominent medial markings. There are many ventral head setae. The mandible is shorter than the head capsule. The larvae differ from all other Froggattisca species by having dolichasters present on the ventral side of the head.

The insect is known only from its type locality in Kakadu, where the larvae are found in caves between layers of volcanic rock.
