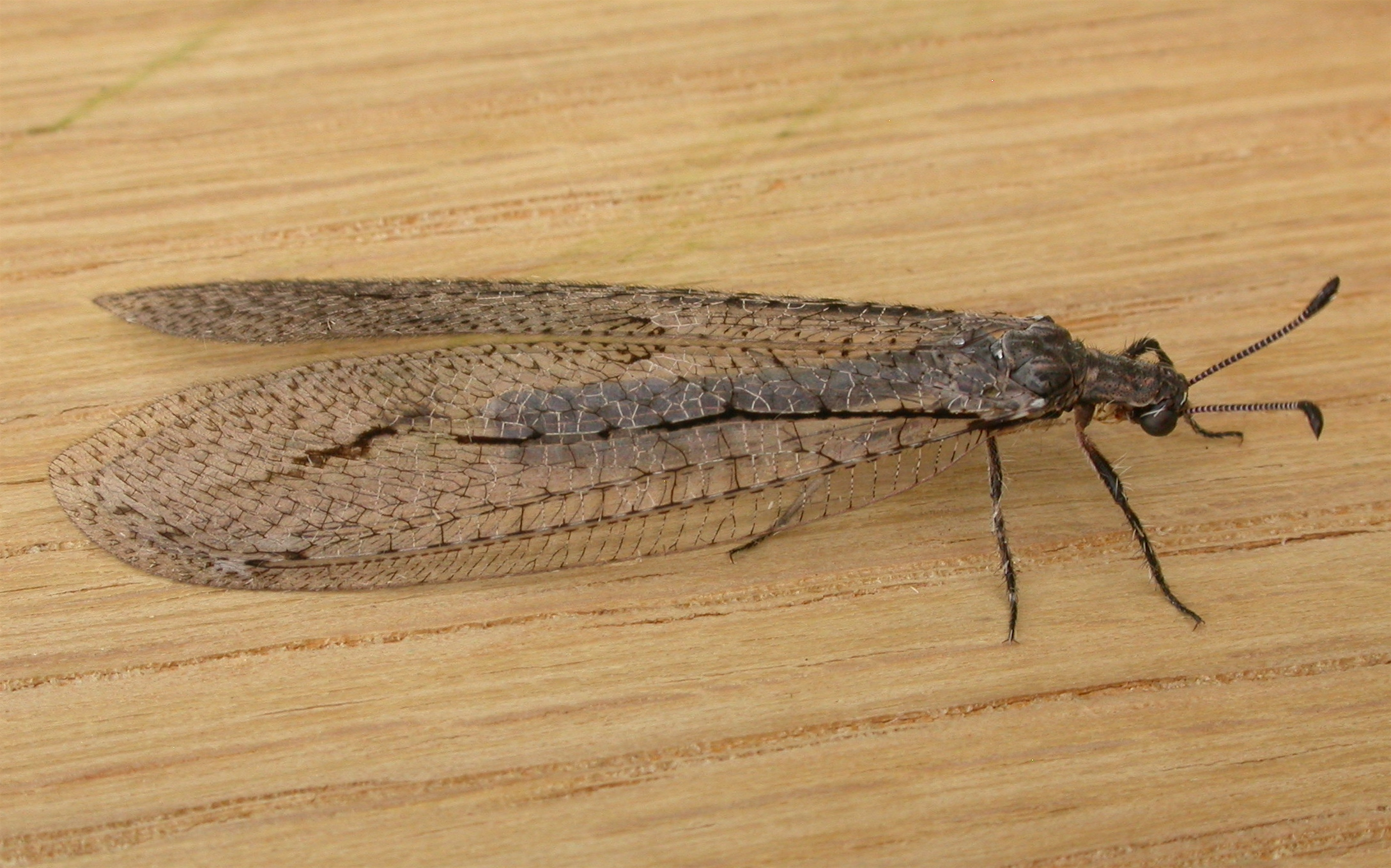

Scientific classification
- Kingdom: Animalia
- Phylum: Arthropoda
- Clade: Pancrustacea
- Class: Insecta
- Order: Neuroptera
- Family: Myrmeleontidae
- Genus: Glenoleon
- Species: G. rudda

Binomial name
- Glenoleon rudda New, 1985

= Glenoleon rudda =

Species of insect

Glenoleon rudda is a species of antlions that occurs in Australia.
