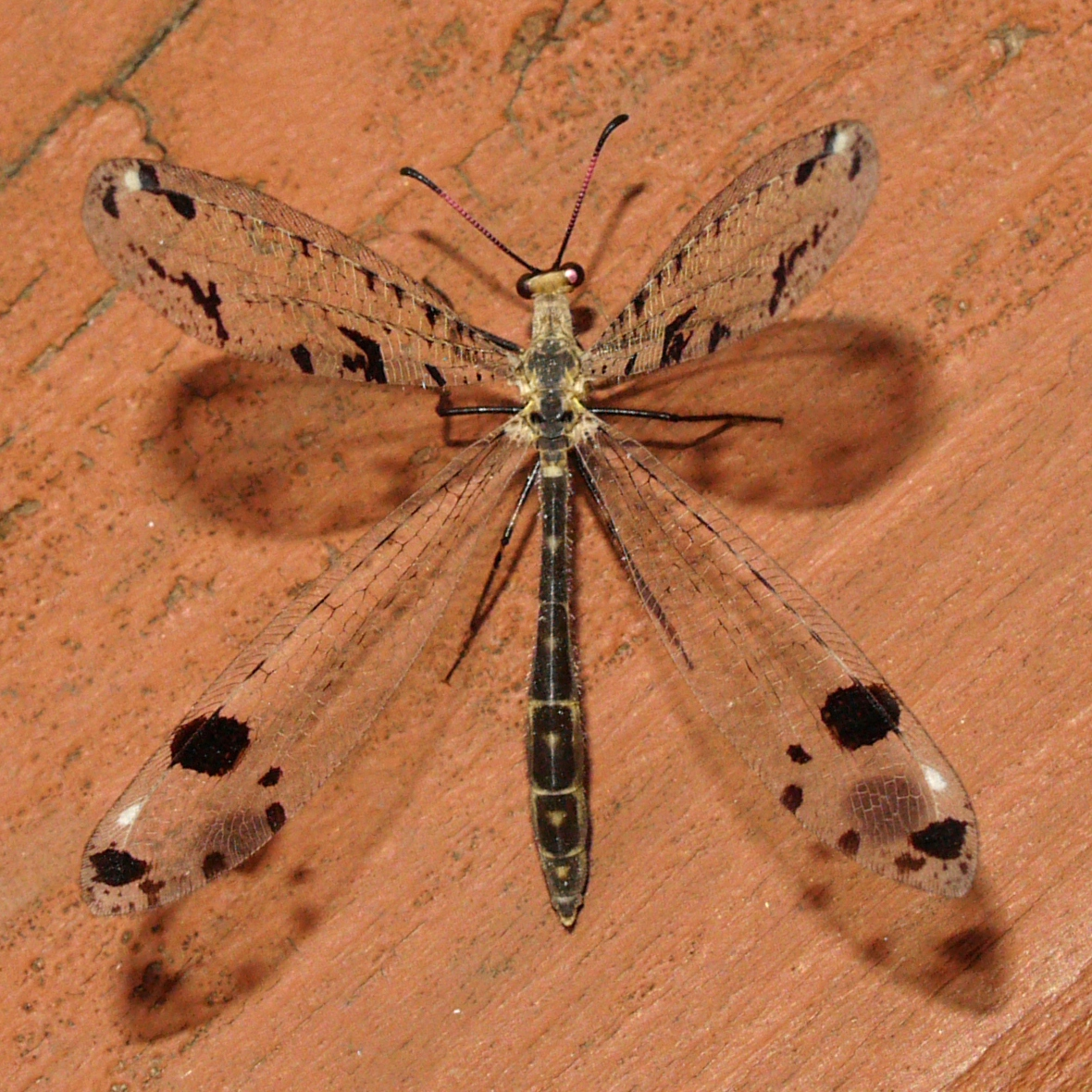

Scientific classification
- Domain: Eukaryota
- Kingdom: Animalia
- Phylum: Arthropoda
- Class: Insecta
- Order: Neuroptera
- Family: Myrmeleontidae
- Genus: Dendroleon
- Species: D. obsoletus

Binomial name
- Dendroleon obsoletus (Say, 1839)

= Dendroleon obsoletus =

Species of insect

Dendroleon obsoletus, the spotted-winged antlion, is a species of antlion in the family Myrmeleontidae. It is found in North America.
