= Froggattisca tipularia =

Scientific classification
- Domain: Eukaryota
- Kingdom: Animalia
- Phylum: Arthropoda
- Class: Insecta
- Order: Neuroptera
- Family: Myrmeleontidae
- Genus: Froggattisca
- Species: F. tipularia

Binomial name
- Froggattisca tipularia (Gerstaecker, 1885)

Synonyms
- Gymnocnemia tipularia Gerstaecker, 1885 Austrogymncicnemia tipularia (Gerstaecker, 1885)

Species of insects

Froggattisca tipularia is a species of cave-dwelling antlion (or Myrmeleontidae), endemic to Queensland. the Northern Territory and New South Wales.

The species was first described as Gymnocnemia tipularia in 1923 by Carl Eduard Adolph Gerstaecker.

Miller and Stange describe this species (and all Froggattisca species) as not being a true cave-dwelling antlion, because not all life stages are confined to caves, and differentiate this species of Froggattisca from all other cave-dwelling Froggattisca by their having no tibial spurs, and by their larvae having no setae on the ventral side of the head.
