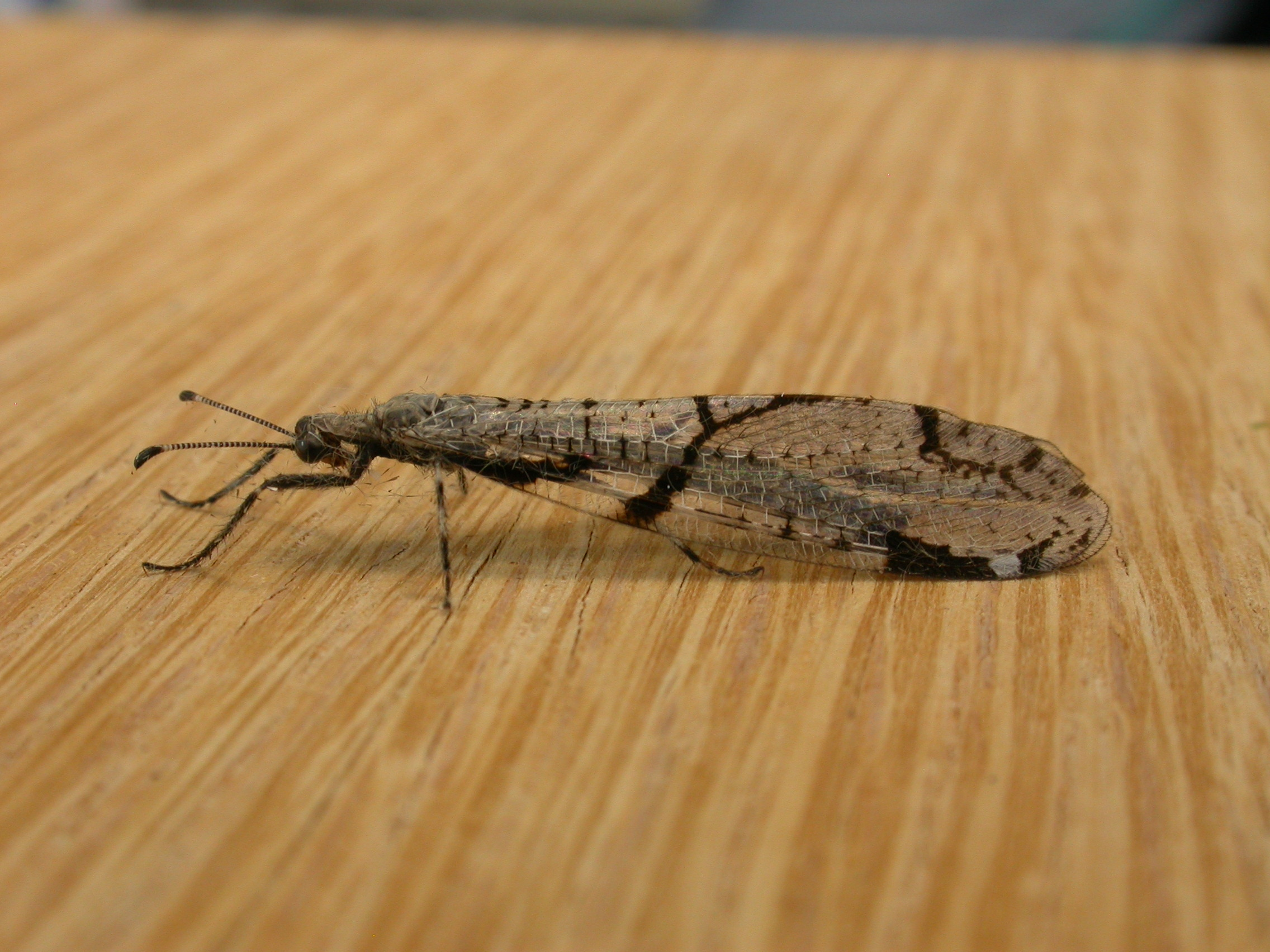
- Dendroleon amabilis

Scientific classification
- Domain: Eukaryota
- Kingdom: Animalia
- Phylum: Arthropoda
- Class: Insecta
- Order: Neuroptera
- Family: Myrmeleontidae
- Subfamily: Dendroleontinae
- Tribe: Dendroleontini
- Genus: Dendroleon; Brauer, 1866

= Dendroleon =

Genus of insects

Dendroleon is a genus of antlions in the family Myrmeleontidae. There are more than 20 described species in Dendroleon.

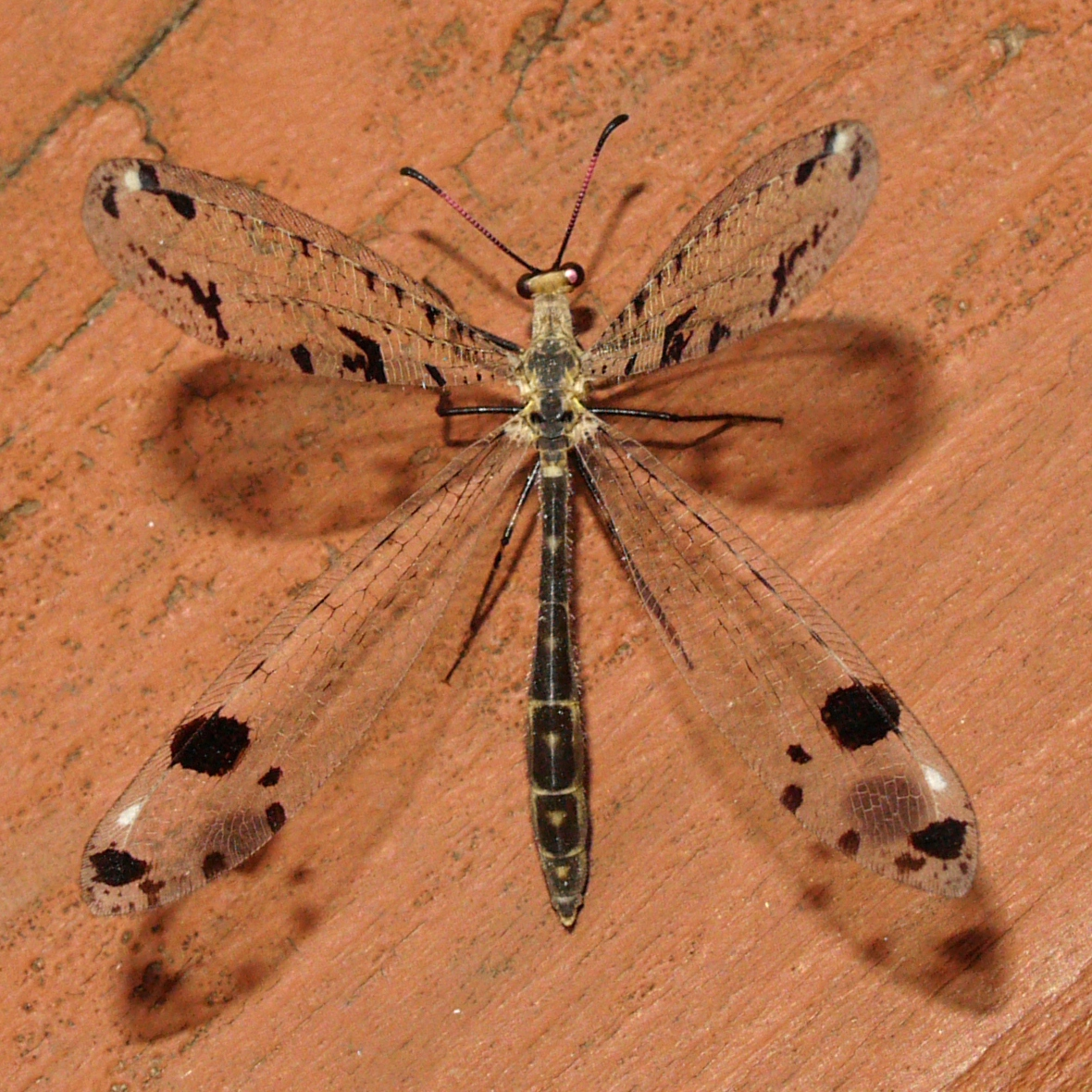
Dendroleon obsoletus

== Species ==
These 21 species belong to the genus Dendroleon:

- Dendroleon amabilis (Gerstaecker, 1885)
- Dendroleon callipterus X. Wan et al., 2004
- Dendroleon dumigani Tillyard, 1916
- Dendroleon esbenpeterseni Miller & Stange in Miller et al., 1999
- Dendroleon falcatus Zhan & X.-I. Wang in Zhan et al., 2012
- Dendroleon javanus Banks, 1914
- Dendroleon kiungaensis New, 1990
- Dendroleon koongarrensis New, 1985
- Dendroleon lii X. Wan et al., 2004
- Dendroleon longicruris (C.-k. Yang, 1986)
- Dendroleon longipennis Esben-Petersen, 1915
- Dendroleon motuoensis Z.-l. Wang & X.-l. Wang, 2008
- Dendroleon obsoletus (Say, 1839) (spotted-winged antlion)
- Dendroleon pantherinus (Fabricius, 1787)
- Dendroleon porteri Stange, 2008
- Dendroleon pupillaris (Gerstaecker, 1894)
- Dendroleon regius (Navás, 1914)
- Dendroleon septemmontanus Statz, 1936
- Dendroleon similis Esben-Petersen, 1923
- Dendroleon speciosus Banks, 1905
- Dendroleon vitripennis (Navás, 1912)
