= Spirama euphrages =

Scientific classification
- Kingdom: Animalia
- Phylum: Arthropoda
- Clade: Pancrustacea
- Class: Insecta
- Order: Lepidoptera
- Superfamily: Noctuoidea
- Family: Erebidae
- Genus: Spirama
- Species: S. euphrages

Binomial name
- Spirama euphrages (Prout, 1924)

Synonyms
- Speiredonia euphrages Prout, 1924

Species of moth

Spirama euphrages is a species of moth of the family Erebidae. It is found in Indonesia (Irian Jaya).
