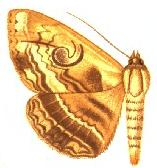
- Female
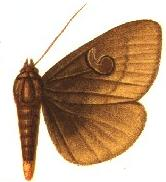
- Male

Scientific classification
- Domain: Eukaryota
- Kingdom: Animalia
- Phylum: Arthropoda
- Class: Insecta
- Order: Lepidoptera
- Superfamily: Noctuoidea
- Family: Erebidae
- Genus: Spirama
- Species: S. kalaoensis

Binomial name
- Spirama kalaoensis Swinhoe, 1904

Synonyms
- Speiredonia calaoensis Hampson, 1913

= Spirama kalaoensis =

Species of moth

Spirama kalaoensis is a species of moth of the family Erebidae. It is found on Sulawesi and Flores.
