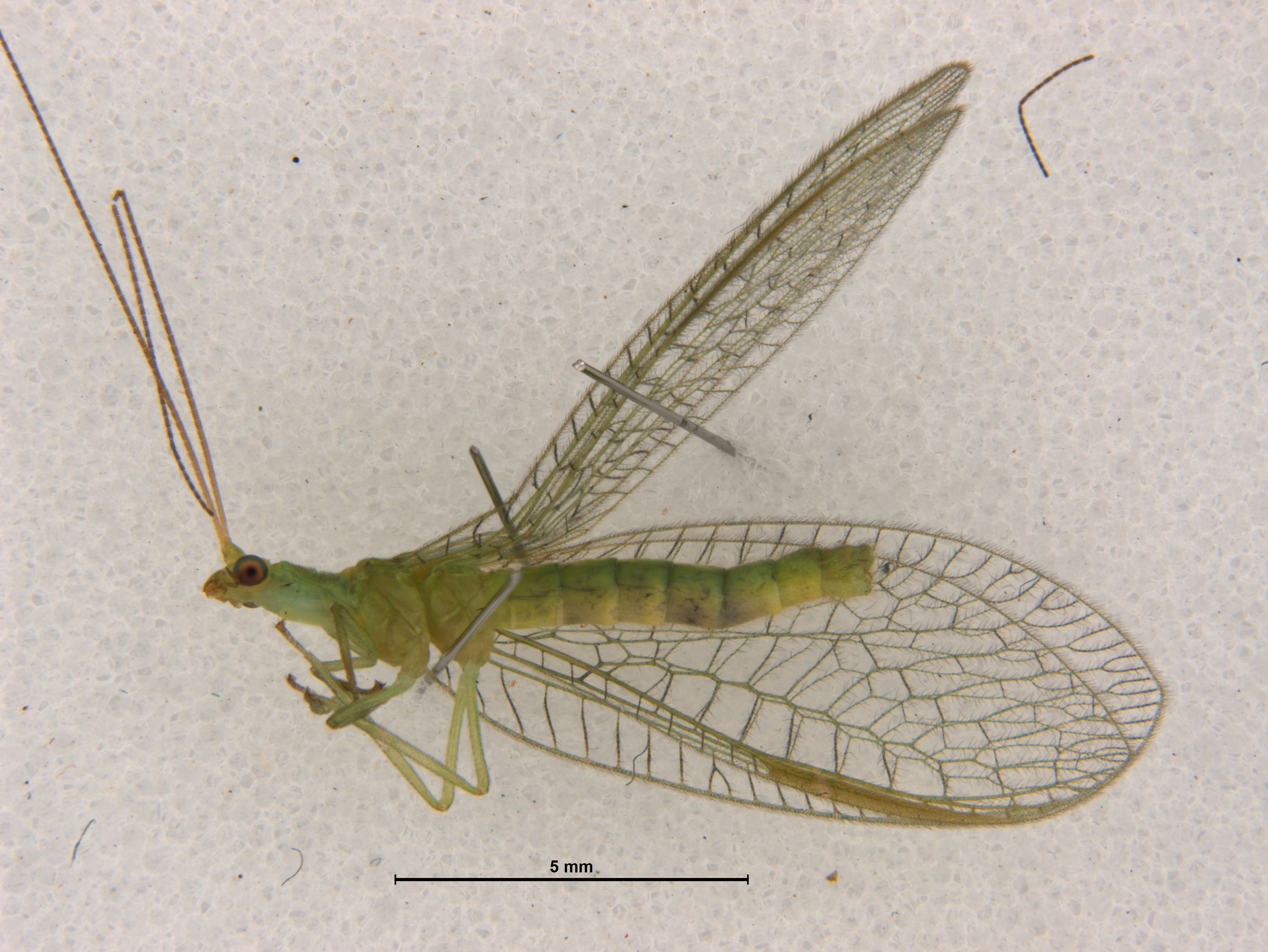
- Mallada basalis from New Zealand

Scientific classification
- Kingdom: Animalia
- Phylum: Arthropoda
- Class: Insecta
- Order: Neuroptera
- Family: Chrysopidae
- Genus: Mallada
- Species: M. basalis

Binomial name
- Mallada basalis Walker, 1853

Synonyms
- Anisochrysa paradoxa Nakahara, 1955; Mallada delmasinus Navás, 1935; Chrysopa delmasi Navás, 1927; Chrysopa delmasi var. densata Navás, 1927; Mallada stigmatus Navás, [1925]; Chrysopa skottsbergi Esben-Petersen, [1924]; Chrysopa tagalica Banks, [1914]; Chrysopa formosana Esben-Petersen, 1913; Chrysopa latotalis Banks, 1910; Chrysopa olatatis Banks, 1910; Chrysopa jolyana Navás, 1910; Chrysopa microphya McLachlan, 1883; Chrysopa basalis Walker, 1853

= Mallada basalis =

Species of insect

Mallada basalis is a species of green lacewing in the family Chrysopidae, first described by Francis Walker in 1853. No subspecies are listed in the Catalog of Life. The species was detected on mainland New Zealand in the 2010s.

== Description and ecology ==
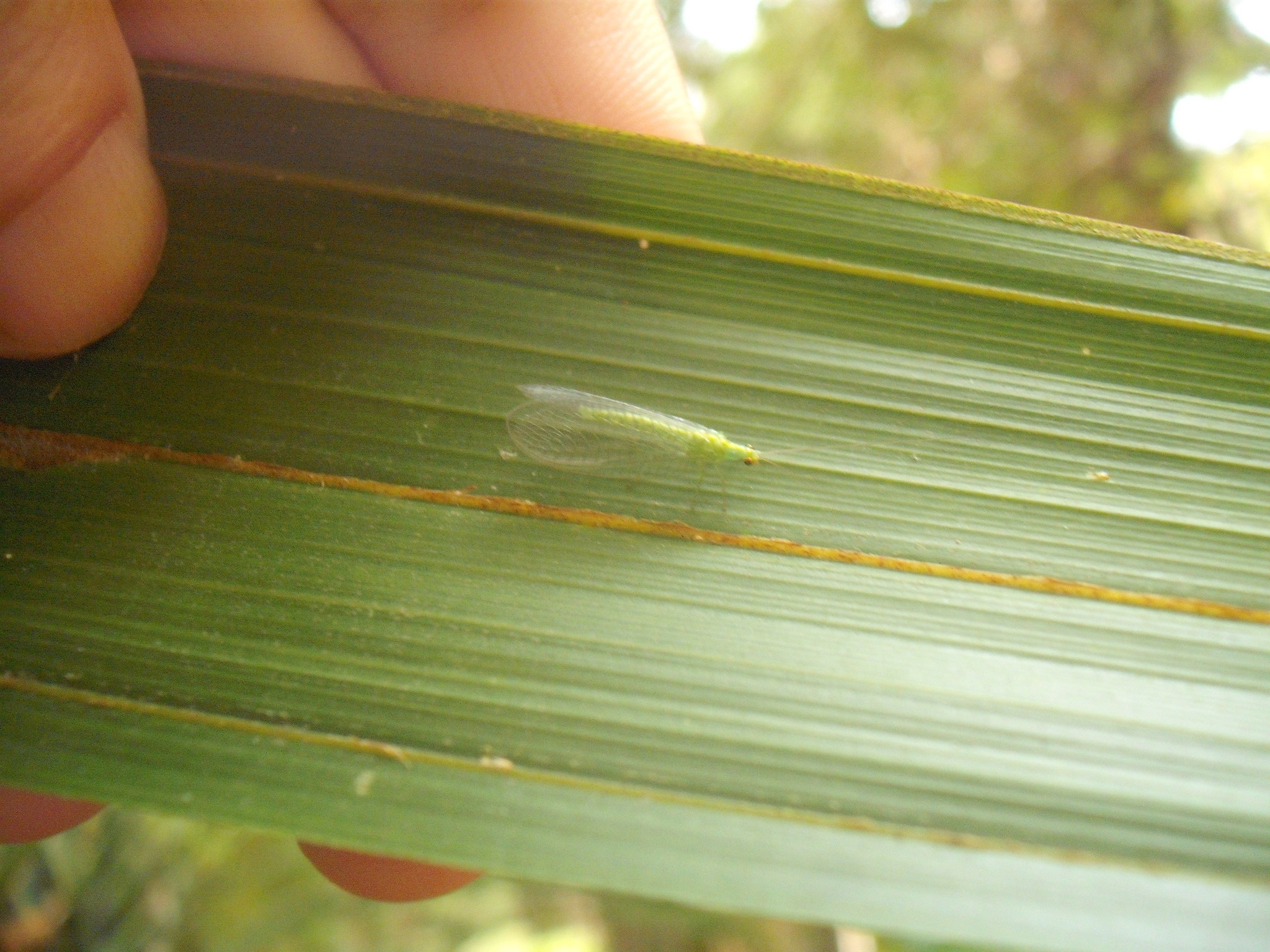
Mallada basalis in Auckland (2020).

Mallada basalis has a length of 10–15 mm, and typically has a pale green colour. Its translucent, veined wings are iridescent in natural sunlight. Specimens can be identified by a green pterostigma present in the hind wings that is not present in Chrysopidae of a similar appearance.

== Distribution and habitat ==
Mallada basalis has been identified on the Eastern states of Australia, the Philippines, Taiwan, the Ryukyu Islands, Micronesia and Polynesia (including an outlier population on Easter Island). Mallada basalis has been seen living in both suburban and native flora environments.

The first confirmed sighting of Mallada basalis in New Zealand was in 1940 on the Kermadec Islands, though evidence of the species may go back as far as 1908. In 2010, a specimen was identified on Tiritiri Matangi Island in the Hauraki Gulf, and the first specimen in Auckland was identified in 2016. By 2020, Mallada basalis was present across the Auckland and Northland Regions. As of 2020, it is unclear if this species self-introduced to New Zealand, or if it was introduced due to human activity. The impact of this species on New Zealand is currently unknown. No native Chrysopidae species have been previously described from mainland New Zealand; their presence may control agricultural pests such as aphids and mealybugs, or pose a risk to native insect life. Many lacewing species were imported to New Zealand between the 1920s and 1970s, however none successfully established populations in the country.
