= Froggattisca radiostriata =

Scientific classification
- Domain: Eukaryota
- Kingdom: Animalia
- Phylum: Arthropoda
- Class: Insecta
- Order: Neuroptera
- Family: Myrmeleontidae
- Genus: Froggattisca
- Species: F. radiostriata

Binomial name
- Froggattisca radiostriata New, 1985

Species of insects

Froggattisca radiostriata is a species of cave-dwelling antlion (or Myrmeleontidae), endemic to Queensland and Western Australia.

The species was first described in 1985 by Tim New.

Miller and Stange describe this species (and all Froggattisca species) as not being a true cave-dwelling antlion, because not all life stages are confined to caves.
