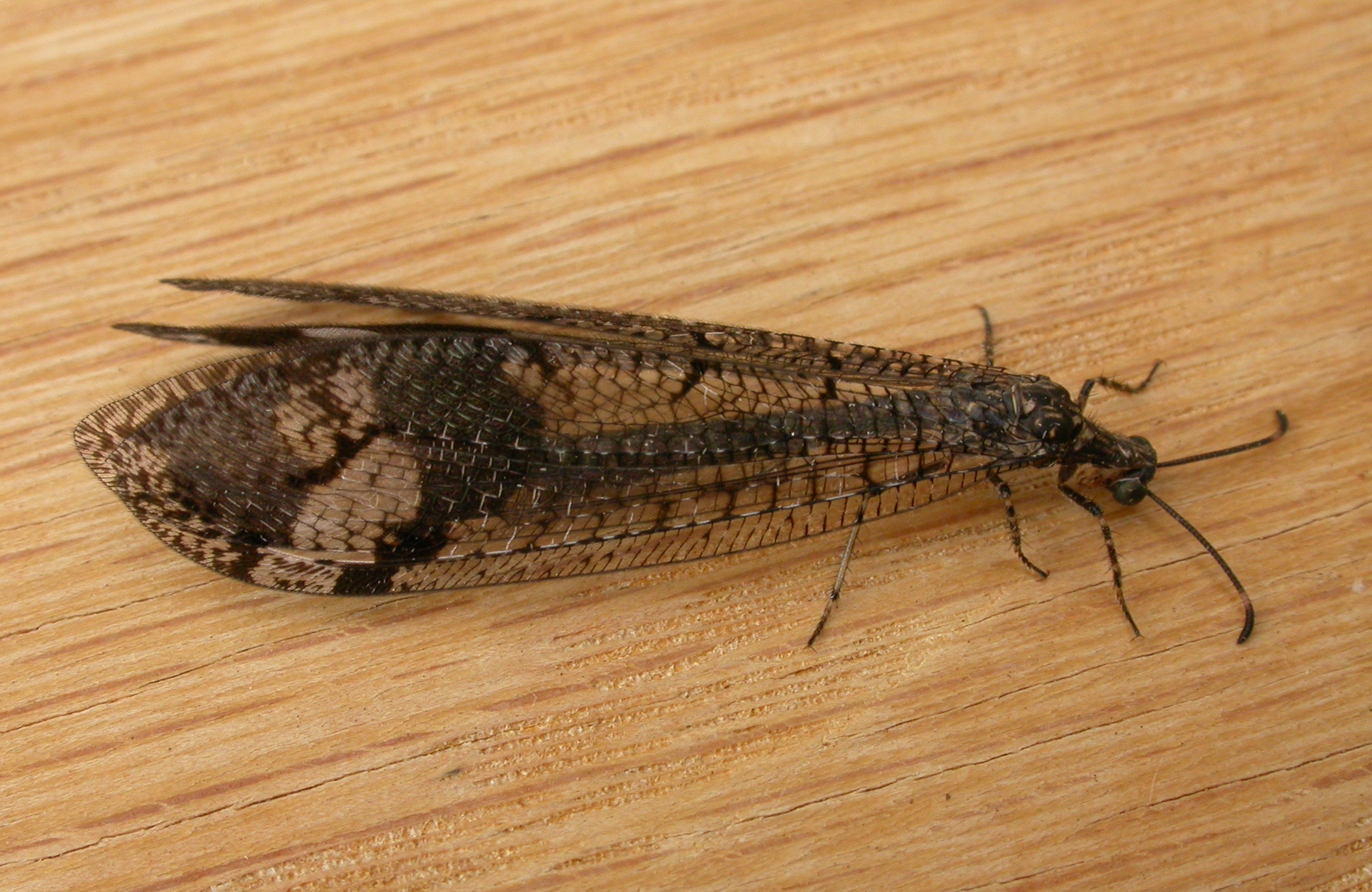

Scientific classification
- Domain: Eukaryota
- Kingdom: Animalia
- Phylum: Arthropoda
- Class: Insecta
- Order: Neuroptera
- Family: Myrmeleontidae
- Genus: Glenoleon
- Species: G. pulchellus

Binomial name
- Glenoleon pulchellus Rambur, 1842

= Glenoleon pulchellus =

Species of insect

Glenoleon pulchellus is an insect in the order Neuroptera. It is the most common ant lion in Australia. The adult is a weak flyer, though it is well camouflaged at rest. Wings are held to the side of the body. The antennae are somewhat club shaped at the tips, wings are mottled with brown patches.

The larval form is an ambush predator. Eggs are laid in the earth, often in caves or under a rocky ledge. The juvenile creates a small crater shaped trap. The ant lion hides under a light cover of sand or earth. When an ant slides into the trap, the larval ant lion grabs the prey with its powerful jaws. The larvae spins a silken cocoon and pupates in the dry soil, later to emerge as an adult.
