= Spirama inconspicua =

Scientific classification
- Domain: Eukaryota
- Kingdom: Animalia
- Phylum: Arthropoda
- Class: Insecta
- Order: Lepidoptera
- Superfamily: Noctuoidea
- Family: Erebidae
- Genus: Spirama
- Species: S. inconspicua

Binomial name
- Spirama inconspicua (Herrich-Schäffer, 1854)

Synonyms
- Hypopyra inconspicua Herrich-Schäffer, 1854

Species of moth

Spirama inconspicua is a species of moth of the family Erebidae. It is found in South Africa.
