= Froggattisca gemma =

Scientific classification
- Domain: Eukaryota
- Kingdom: Animalia
- Phylum: Arthropoda
- Class: Insecta
- Order: Neuroptera
- Family: Myrmeleontidae
- Genus: Froggattisca
- Species: F. gemma

Binomial name
- Froggattisca gemma New, 1985

Species of insects

Froggattisca gemma is a species of cave-dwelling antlion (or Myrmeleontidae), endemic to Queensland and Western Australia.

The species was first described in 1985 by Tim New.

Miller and Stange describe this species (and all Froggattisca species) as not being a true cave-dwelling antlion, because not all life stages are confined to caves.
