= Froggattisca rieki =

Scientific classification
- Domain: Eukaryota
- Kingdom: Animalia
- Phylum: Arthropoda
- Class: Insecta
- Order: Neuroptera
- Family: Myrmeleontidae
- Genus: Froggattisca
- Species: F. rieki

Binomial name
- Froggattisca rieki New, 1985

Species of insect

Froggattisca rieki is a species of cave-dwelling antlion, endemic to the Northern Territory and Western Australia.

The species was first described in 1985 by Tim New.

Miller and Stange describe this species (and all Froggattisca species) as not being a true cave-dwelling antlion, because not all life stages are confined to caves.
