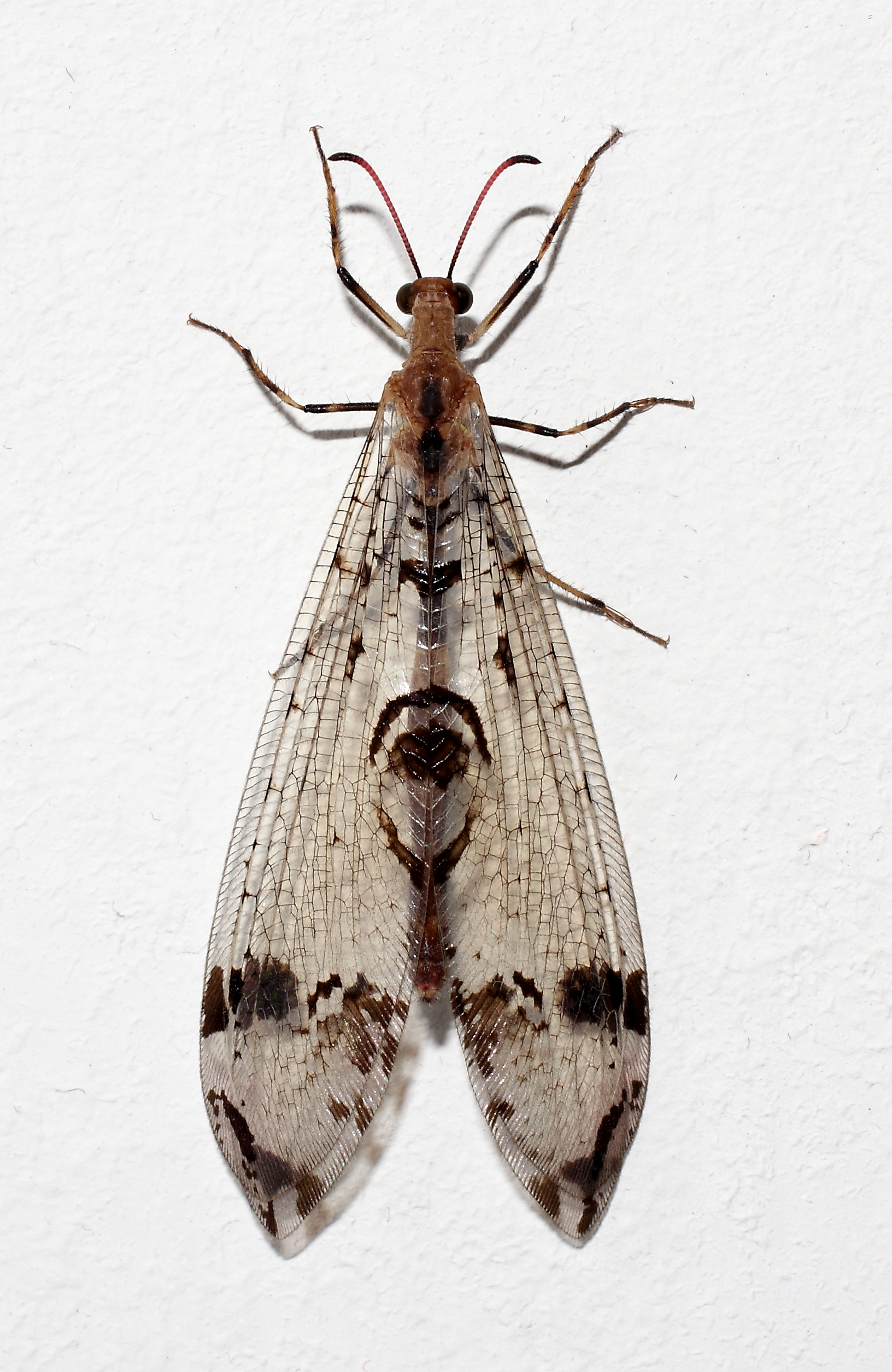

Scientific classification
- Domain: Eukaryota
- Kingdom: Animalia
- Phylum: Arthropoda
- Class: Insecta
- Order: Neuroptera
- Family: Myrmeleontidae
- Genus: Dendroleon
- Species: D. pantherinus

Binomial name
- Dendroleon pantherinus (Fabricius, 1787)

= Dendroleon pantherinus =

Species of insect

Dendroleon pantherinus is a species of neuropteran insects of the antlion (Myrmeleontidae) family. Larvae are unique among antlions, as they do not create sandy pits, but rather develop in hidden shelters such as hollow trees.

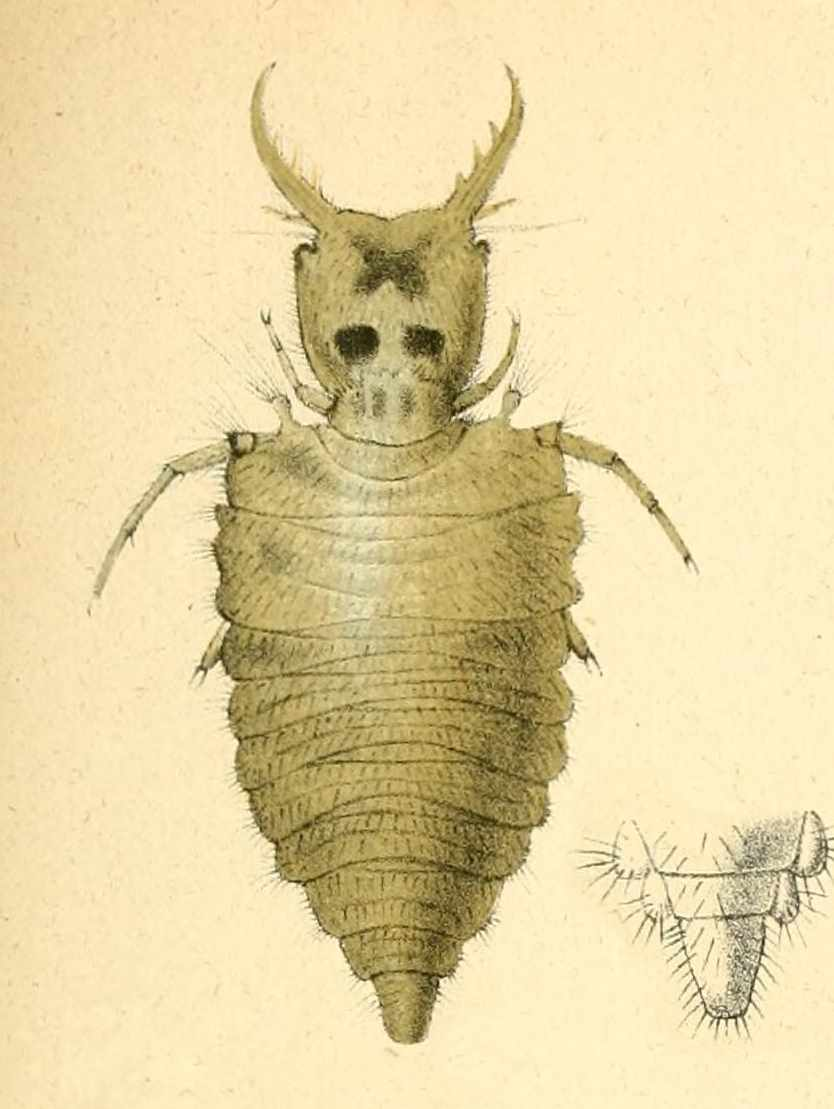
Drawing of a larva by Friedrich Moritz Brauer (1867).

== Taxonomy ==
The species has been described in 1787 by the Danish entomologist Johan Christian Fabricius, with the original combination Myrmeleon pantherinum. The genus Dendroleon is created by Friedrich Moritz Brauer in 1866, with D. pantherinus as type species.
