= Speleon =

Scientific classification
- Domain: Eukaryota
- Kingdom: Animalia
- Phylum: Arthropoda
- Class: Insecta
- Order: Neuroptera
- Family: Myrmeleontidae
- Tribe: Dendroleontini
- Genus: Speleon; Miller & Stange, 2012

Genus of insects

Speleon is a genus of antlions, that is, belonging to the family Myrmeleontidae.

The genus was first described by Miller and Stange in 2012. Despite frequently being referred to as "cave dwelling," Miller and Strange describe them as not being true cave-dwelling antlions, because not all life stages are confined to caves.

== Species ==
These species belong to the genus Speleon:

- Speleon cavernicolus Miller and Stange, 2012
- Speleon pilliga Miller and Stange, 2012
- Speleon yallingup Miller and Stange, 2012
