= Spirama capitulifera =

Scientific classification
- Kingdom: Animalia
- Phylum: Arthropoda
- Clade: Pancrustacea
- Class: Insecta
- Order: Lepidoptera
- Superfamily: Noctuoidea
- Family: Erebidae
- Genus: Spirama
- Species: S. capitulifera

Binomial name
- Spirama capitulifera (Prout, 1919)

Synonyms
- Speiredonia capitulifera Prout, 1919

Species of moth

Spirama capitulifera is a species of moth of the family Erebidae. It is found in Indonesia (Moluccas, Sulawesi).
