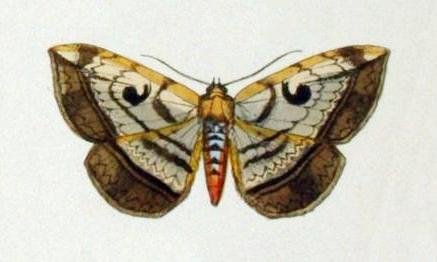
- By Alois Rogenhofer

Scientific classification
- Domain: Eukaryota
- Kingdom: Animalia
- Phylum: Arthropoda
- Class: Insecta
- Order: Lepidoptera
- Superfamily: Noctuoidea
- Family: Erebidae
- Genus: Spirama
- Species: S. voluta

Binomial name
- Spirama voluta Felder & Rogenhofer, 1874

= Spirama voluta =

Species of moth

Spirama voluta is a species of moth of the family Erebidae. It is found in the Moluccas of Indonesia.
