= Spirama miniata =

Scientific classification
- Kingdom: Animalia
- Phylum: Arthropoda
- Class: Insecta
- Order: Lepidoptera
- Superfamily: Noctuoidea
- Family: Erebidae
- Genus: Spirama
- Species: S. miniata

Binomial name
- Spirama miniata (Wallengren, 1856)

Synonyms
- Hypopyra miniata Wallengren, 1856

Species of moth

Spirama miniata is a species of moth of the family Erebidae. It is found in South Africa, where it has been recorded from KwaZulu-Natal.
