= Dendroleon speciosus =

Scientific classification
- Domain: Eukaryota
- Kingdom: Animalia
- Phylum: Arthropoda
- Class: Insecta
- Order: Neuroptera
- Family: Myrmeleontidae
- Genus: Dendroleon
- Species: D. speciosus

Binomial name
- Dendroleon speciosus Banks, 1905

Species of insect

Dendroleon speciosus is a species of antlion in the family Myrmeleontidae. It is found in North America.
