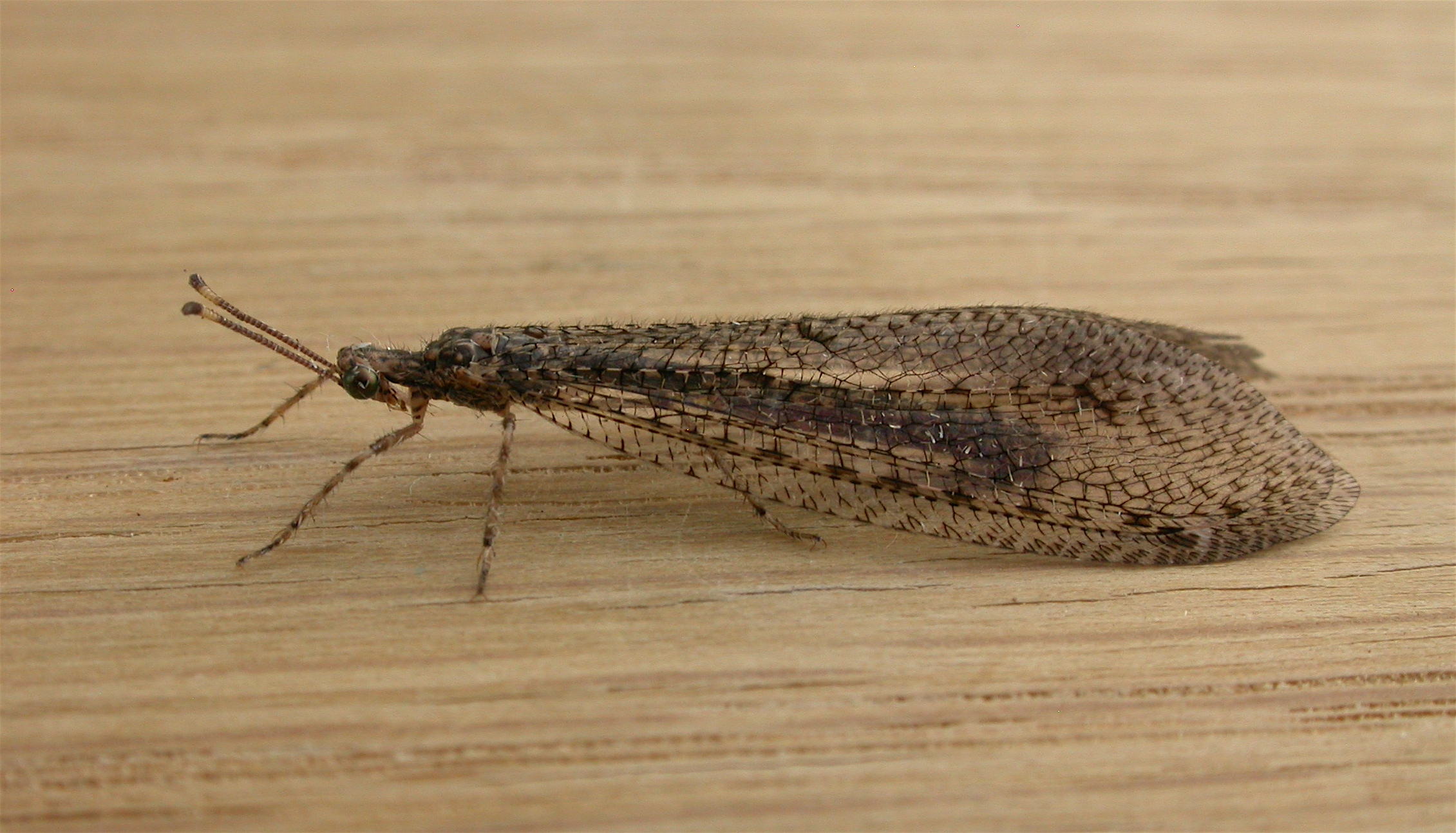

Scientific classification
- Domain: Eukaryota
- Kingdom: Animalia
- Phylum: Arthropoda
- Class: Insecta
- Order: Neuroptera
- Family: Myrmeleontidae
- Genus: Glenoleon
- Species: G. osmyloides

Binomial name
- Glenoleon osmyloides (Gerstaecker, (1885)

= Glenoleon osmyloides =

Species of insect

Glenoleon osmyloides is a species of antlions that occurs in Australia.
