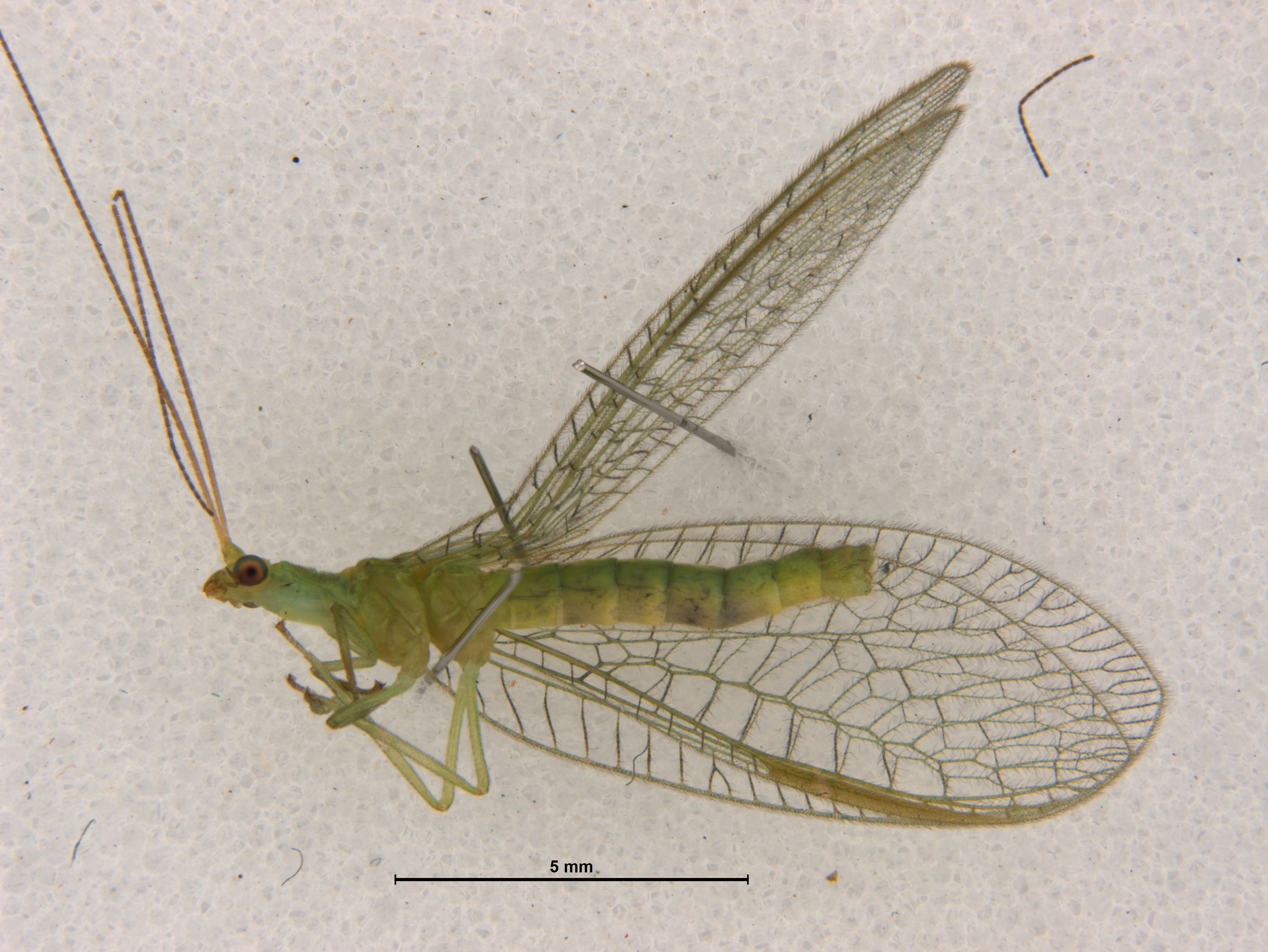
- Mallada basalis

Scientific classification
- Domain: Eukaryota
- Kingdom: Animalia
- Phylum: Arthropoda
- Class: Insecta
- Order: Neuroptera
- Family: Chrysopidae
- Genus: Mallada; Navás, 1925

= Mallada =

Genus of insects

Mallada is a genus of lacewings belonging to the family Chrysopidae. The species of this genus are found in Africa, Southeastern Asia and Australia. The genus was first described by Longinos Navas in 1925, and by monotypy the type species is Mallada stigmatus.

== Species ==
Species accepted by the Australian Faunal Directory:

1. Mallada adamsi (New, 1980)
2. Mallada albofascialis Winterton, 1995
3. Mallada alcines (Banks, 1940)
4. Mallada araucariae (Tillyard, 1917)
5. Mallada basalis (Walker, 1853)
6. Mallada darwini (Banks, 1940)
7. Mallada innotatus (Walker, 1853)
8. Mallada metastigma (Tillyard, 1917)
9. Mallada personatus (Navás, 1934)
10. Mallada satilota (Banks, 1910)
11. Mallada signatus (Schneider, 1851)
12. Mallada traviatus (Banks, 1940)
13. Mallada tripunctatus (McLachlan, 1867)
