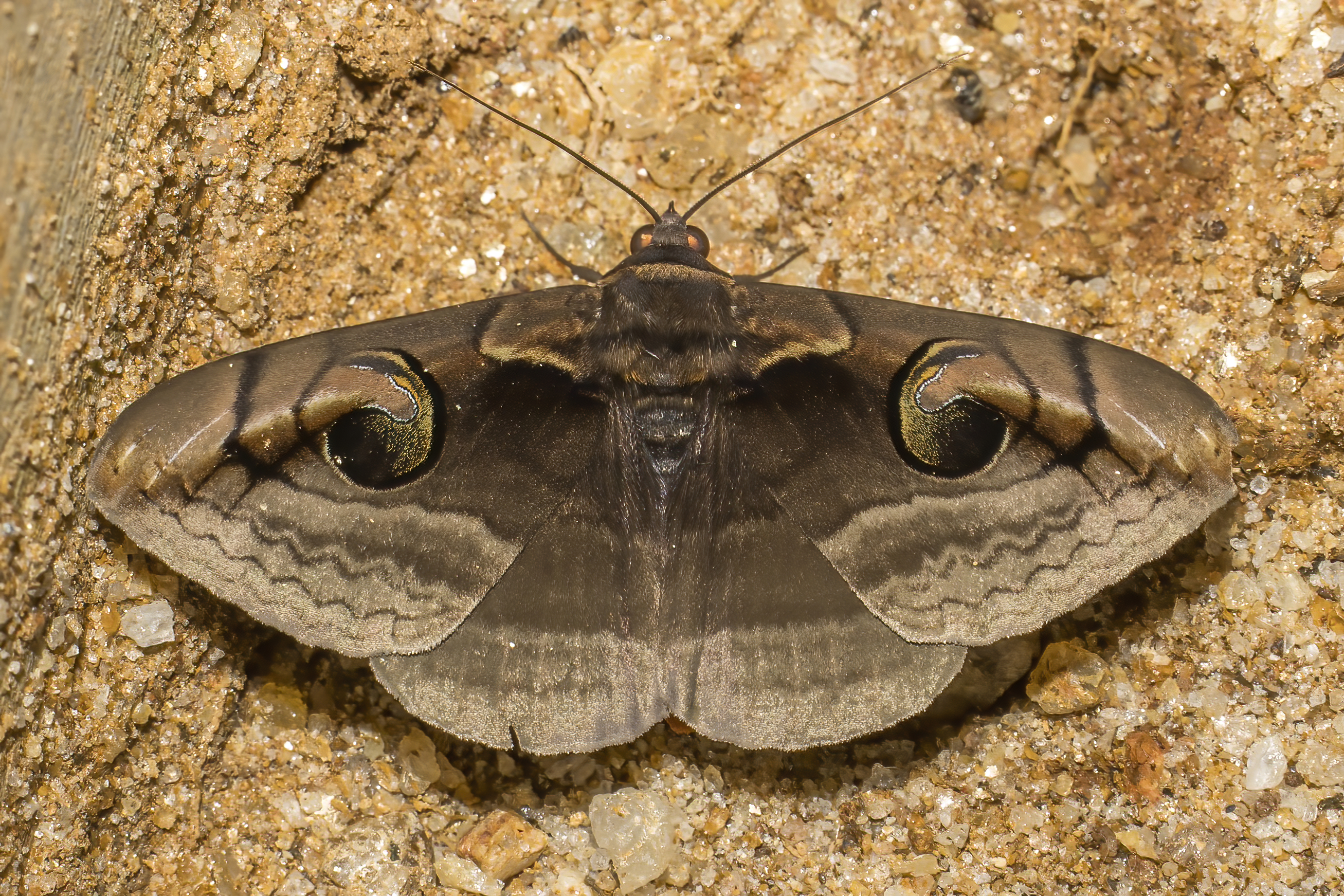
- Spirama sp., Sri Lanka

Scientific classification
- Kingdom: Animalia
- Phylum: Arthropoda
- Class: Insecta
- Order: Lepidoptera
- Superfamily: Noctuoidea
- Family: Erebidae
- Tribe: Hypopyrini
- Genus: Spirama; Guenée in Boisduval & Guenée, 1852

Synonyms
- Spiramia Walker, 1858

= Spirama =

Genus of moths

Spirama is a genus of moths in the family Erebidae first described by Achille Guenée in 1852.

== Description ==
Antennae usually minutely fasciculate (bundled) in the male. The tibia is not hairy and mid-tibia spined. Palpi with second joint reaching vertex of head and third joint naked. Thorax and abdomen smoothly clothed with hair. Forewings with nearly rectangular apex. Hindwings with vein 5 from the lower angle of the cell, which is rather short.

== Defensive display ==
Some of the species, such as S. helicina, S. indenta, S. recessa, S. remota and S. sumbana, have a pattern on the wings that looks like the frontal view of the face of a snake with a slightly opened mouth. This pattern is more clearly discernible in females. It may intimidate potential predators and dissuade them from attacking.

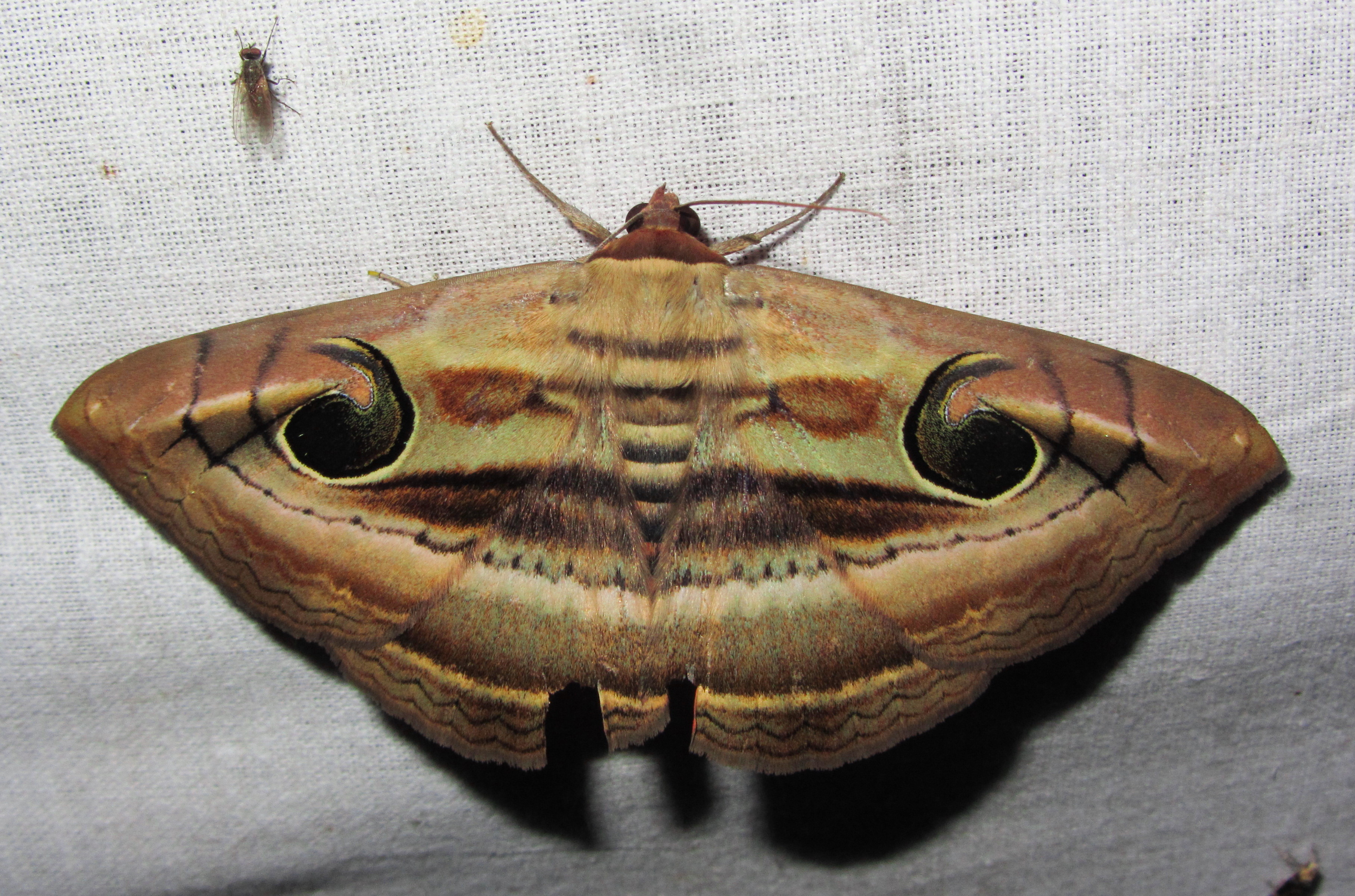
Spirama indenta female

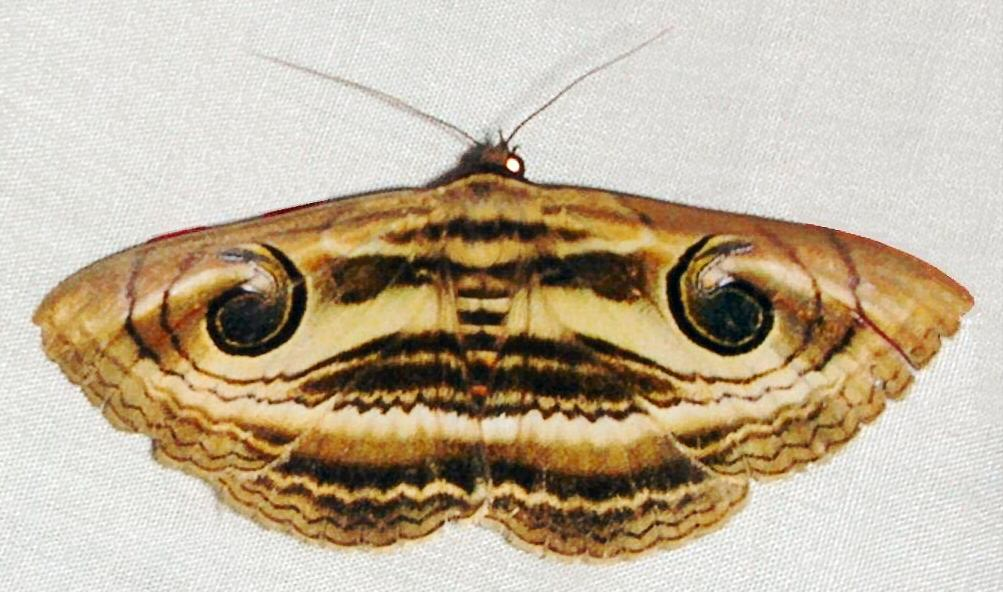
Spirama helicina female

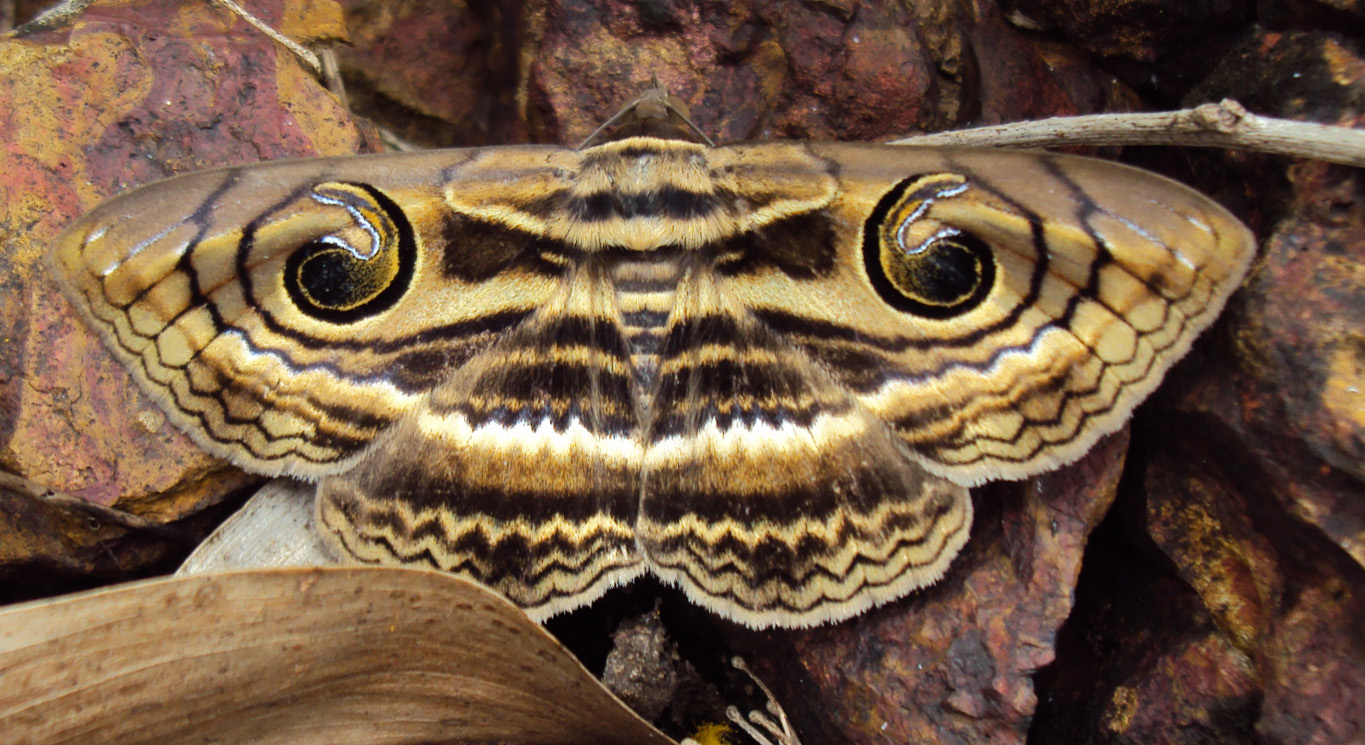
Spirama retorta female

== Species ==
- Spirama biformis Hulstaert, 1924
- Spirama capitulifera Prout, 1919
- Spirama euphrages Prout, 1924
- Spirama euspira (Hubner, 1823)
- Spirama glaucescens Butler, 1893
- Spirama griseisigma Hampson, 1913
- Spirama helicina Hübner, [1831]
- Spirama inconspicua Herrich-Schäffer, [1854]
- Spirama indenta Hampson, 1891
- Spirama kalaoensis Swinhoe, 1904
- Spirama miniata Wallengren, 1856
- Spirama paecila (Guenée, 1852)
- Spirama recessa Walker, 1858
- Spirama remota Felder, 1861
- Spirama retorta Clerck, 1764
- Spirama sumbana Swinhoe, 1904
- Spirama triloba Guenée, 1852
- Spirama voluta Felder & Rogenhofer, 1874

== Former species ==
- Spirama obscura Cramer, 1780 was moved to the genus Speiredonia in 2005.
- Spirama revolvens (Walker, 1858)
