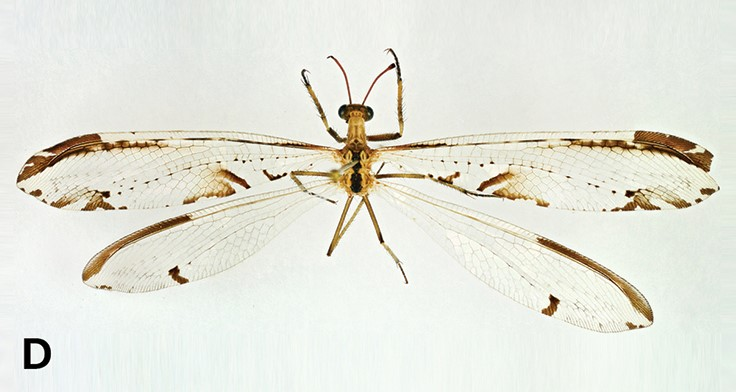
- Omoleon jeanneli

Scientific classification
- Domain: Eukaryota
- Kingdom: Animalia
- Phylum: Arthropoda
- Class: Insecta
- Order: Neuroptera
- Family: Myrmeleontidae
- Subfamily: Dendroleontinae
- Tribe: Dendroleontini; Banks, 1899

= Dendroleontini =

Tribe of insects

Dendroleontini is a tribe in the antlion subfamily Dendroleontinae.

== Genera ==
BioLib includes:

1. Afghanoleon Hölzel, 1972
2. Anomaloplectron Esben-Petersen, 1919
3. Bankisus Navás, 1912
4. Bullanga Navás, 1917
5. Cuca Navás, 1923
6. Cymothales Gerstaecker, 1894
7. Dendroleon Brauer, 1866
8. Doblina Navás, 1927
9. Epacanthaclisis Okamoto, 1910
10. Froggattisca Esben-Petersen, 1915
11. Fusoleon New, 1985
12. Gatzara Navás, 1915
13. Glenoleon Banks, 1913
14. Indoclystus Banks, 1941
15. Layahima Navás, 1912
16. Mossega Navás, 1914
17. Nannoleon Esben-Petersen, 1928
18. Neleinus Navás, 1915
19. Nepsalus Navás, 1914
20. Nomes (insect) Navás, 1914
21. Omoleon Navás, 1936
22. Parvoleon New, 1985
23. Phanoleon Banks, 1931
24. Platyleon Esben-Petersen, 1923
25. Riekoleon New, 1985
26. Speleon Miller & Stange, 2012
27. Tricholeon Esben-Petersen, 1925
