= Spirama glaucescens =

Scientific classification
- Domain: Eukaryota
- Kingdom: Animalia
- Phylum: Arthropoda
- Class: Insecta
- Order: Lepidoptera
- Superfamily: Noctuoidea
- Family: Erebidae
- Genus: Spirama
- Species: S. glaucescens

Binomial name
- Spirama glaucescens (Butler, 1893)

Synonyms
- Calliodes glaucescens Butler, 1893; Speiredonia glaucescens

Species of moth

Spirama glaucescens is a species of moth of the family Erebidae. It is found in the Democratic Republic of Congo (East Kasai, Katanga), Malawi, Mozambique, Tanzania, Zambia and Zimbabwe.

Like other species of genus Spirama, S. glaucescens has a pattern on the wings when the moth is resting that looks like the face of a snake with slightly opened mouth.
