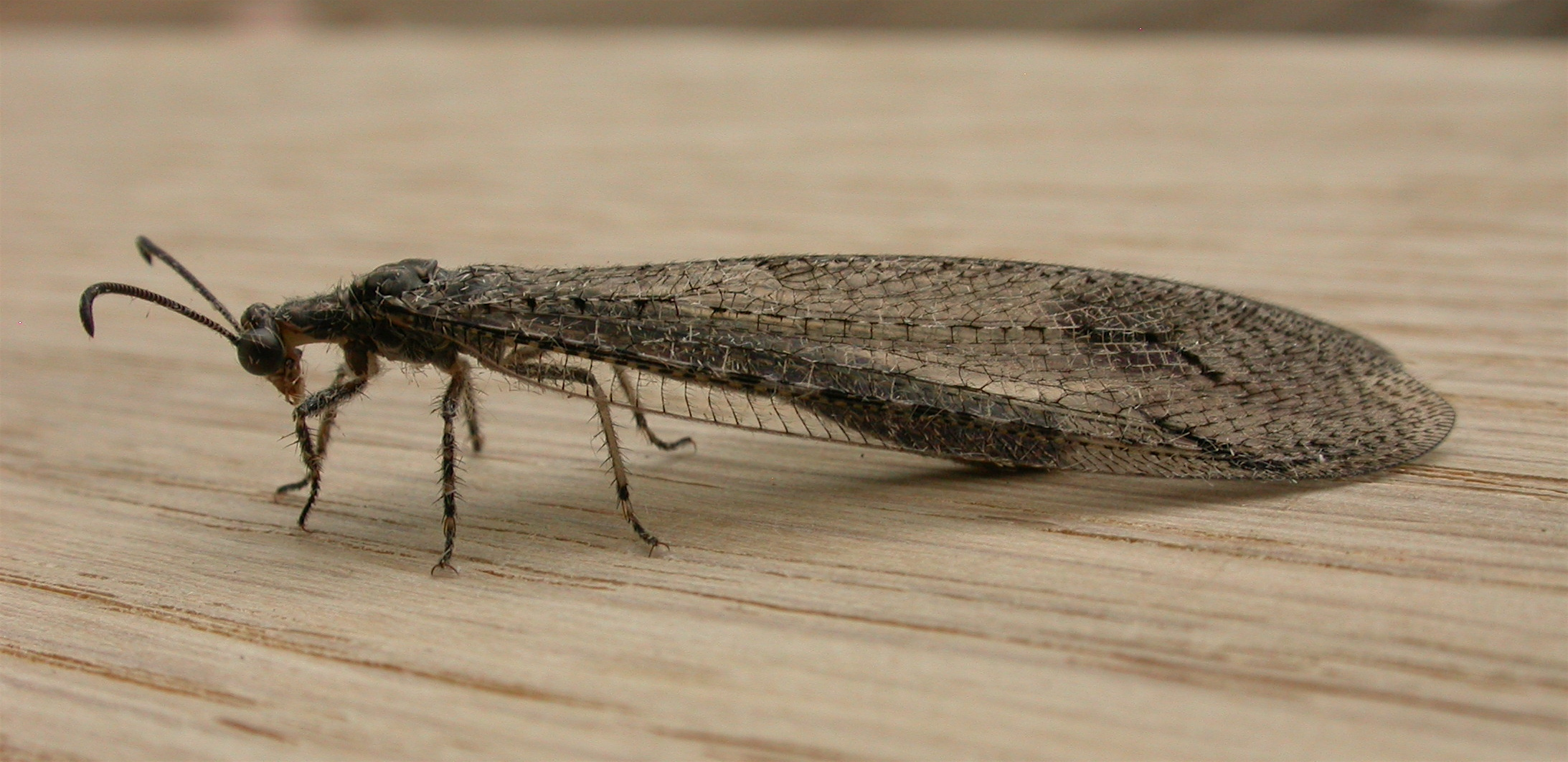

Scientific classification
- Domain: Eukaryota
- Kingdom: Animalia
- Phylum: Arthropoda
- Class: Insecta
- Order: Neuroptera
- Family: Myrmeleontidae
- Genus: Glenoleon
- Species: G. meteoricus

Binomial name
- Glenoleon meteoricus (Gerstaecker, (1885)

= Glenoleon meteoricus =

Species of insect

Glenoleon meteoricus is a species of antlion that occurs in Australia.
