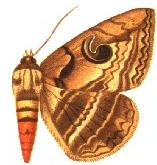
- Female
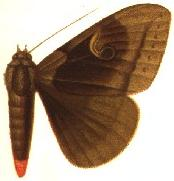
- Male

Scientific classification
- Domain: Eukaryota
- Kingdom: Animalia
- Phylum: Arthropoda
- Class: Insecta
- Order: Lepidoptera
- Superfamily: Noctuoidea
- Family: Erebidae
- Genus: Spirama
- Species: S. remota

Binomial name
- Spirama remota Felder, 1861

Synonyms
- Spirama funestis Butler, 1884; Spiramia funestis; Speiredonia remota Rothschild, 1915

= Spirama remota =

Species of moth

Spirama remota is a species of moth of the family Erebidae. It is found in Indonesia (Ambon Island, Seram) and New Guinea.
