= Froggattisca rennerensis =

Scientific classification
- Domain: Eukaryota
- Kingdom: Animalia
- Phylum: Arthropoda
- Class: Insecta
- Order: Neuroptera
- Family: Myrmeleontidae
- Genus: Froggattisca
- Species: F. rennerensis

Binomial name
- Froggattisca rennerensis Miller & Stange, 2012

Species of insect

Froggattisca rennerensis is a species of cave-dwelling antlion (or Myrmeleontidae), endemic to the Northern Territory.

The species was first described by Miller and Stange in 2012, Its species epithet, rennerensis, names the species as coming from its type locality, Mount Renner, in the Northern Territory.

Miller and Stange describe this species as not being a true cave-dwelling antlion, because not all life stages are confined to caves.

== Description ==
Froggattisca rennerensis may be differentiated from other Froggattisca species using the following characters:

1. adults with
  1. forewings without markings;
  2. foreleg longer than hindleg;
  3. minute tibial spurs;
2. larvae whose
  1. ventral head capsule has sparse tiny black setae;
  2. ventral head capsule is unmarked;
  3. ventral side of the abdomen and thorax have dark-brown markings;
  4. mandible is the same length as the head capsule.

The insect is known only from its type locality, Mount Renner.
