= Spirama paecila =

Scientific classification
- Domain: Eukaryota
- Kingdom: Animalia
- Phylum: Arthropoda
- Class: Insecta
- Order: Lepidoptera
- Superfamily: Noctuoidea
- Family: Erebidae
- Genus: Spirama
- Species: S. paecila

Binomial name
- Spirama paecila (Guenée, 1852)

Synonyms
- Sericia paecila Guenée, 1852

Species of moth

Spirama paecila is a species of moth of the family Erebidae. It is found in Brazil (Para).
