= Froggattisca anicis =

Scientific classification
- Domain: Eukaryota
- Kingdom: Animalia
- Phylum: Arthropoda
- Class: Insecta
- Order: Neuroptera
- Family: Myrmeleontidae
- Genus: Froggattisca
- Species: F. anicis

Binomial name
- Froggattisca anicis New, 1985

Species of insects

Froggattisca anicis is a species of cave-dwelling antlion (or Myrmeleontidae), endemic to the Northern Territory and Western Australia.

The species was first described in 1985 by Tim New.

Miller and Stange describe this species (and all Froggattisca species) as not being a true cave-dwelling antlion, because not all life stages are confined to caves.
