= Dendroleontinae =

Scientific classification
- Domain: Eukaryota
- Kingdom: Animalia
- Phylum: Arthropoda
- Class: Insecta
- Order: Neuroptera
- Family: Myrmeleontidae
- Subfamily: Dendroleontinae; Banks, 1899

Subfamily of insects

Dendroleontinae is a subfamily of Myrmeleontidae, the antlions.

== Tribes and genera ==
BioLib includes:

Acanthoplectrini Markl, 1954

1. Acanthoplectron Esben-Petersen, 1918

Bandidini Krivokhatsky, 1998

1. Bandidus Navás, 1914
2. Brachyleon Tillyard, 1916
3. Eophanes Banks, 1931
4. Escura Navás, 1914
5. Stenogymnocnemia Esben-Petersen, 1923
6. Stenoleon Tillyard, 1916
7. Xantholeon Tillyard, 1916

Dendroleontini Banks, 1899

Selected genera:

- Bankisus Navás, 1912
- Bullanga Navás, 1917
- Dendroleon Brauer, 1866
- Glenoleon Banks, 1913

Nuglerini Stange, 1976

1. Nuglerus Navás, 1912

Periclystini Stange, 1976

1. Austrogymnocnemia Esben-Petersen, 1917
2. Ceratoleon Esben-Petersen, 1917
3. Chrysoleon Banks, 1910
4. Compsoleon Banks, 1913
5. Csiroleon New, 1985
6. Franzenia Esben-Petersen, 1929
7. Periclystus Gerstaecker, 1888

Voltorini Stange, 1976

1. Voltor (insect) Navás, 1935
