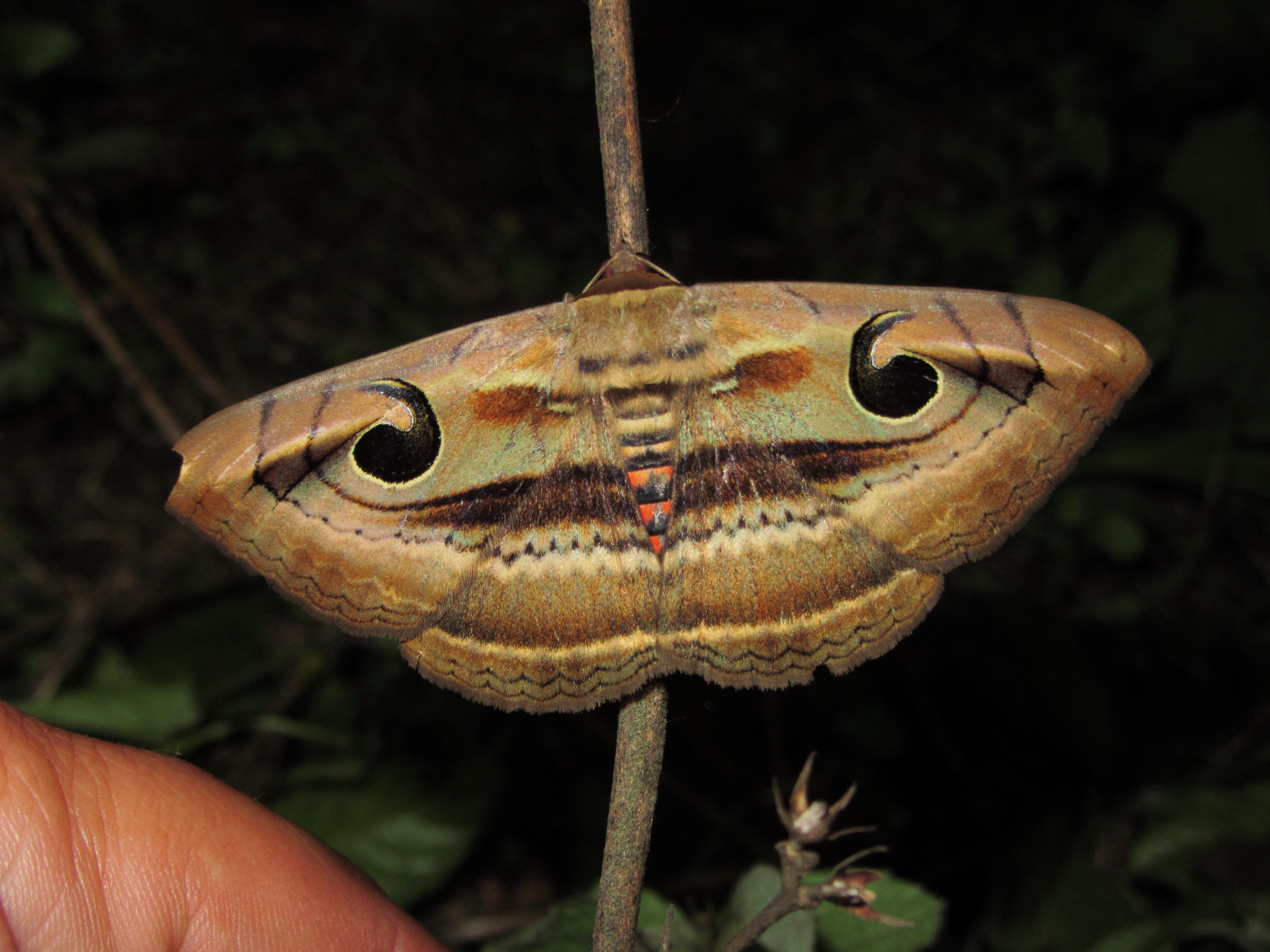

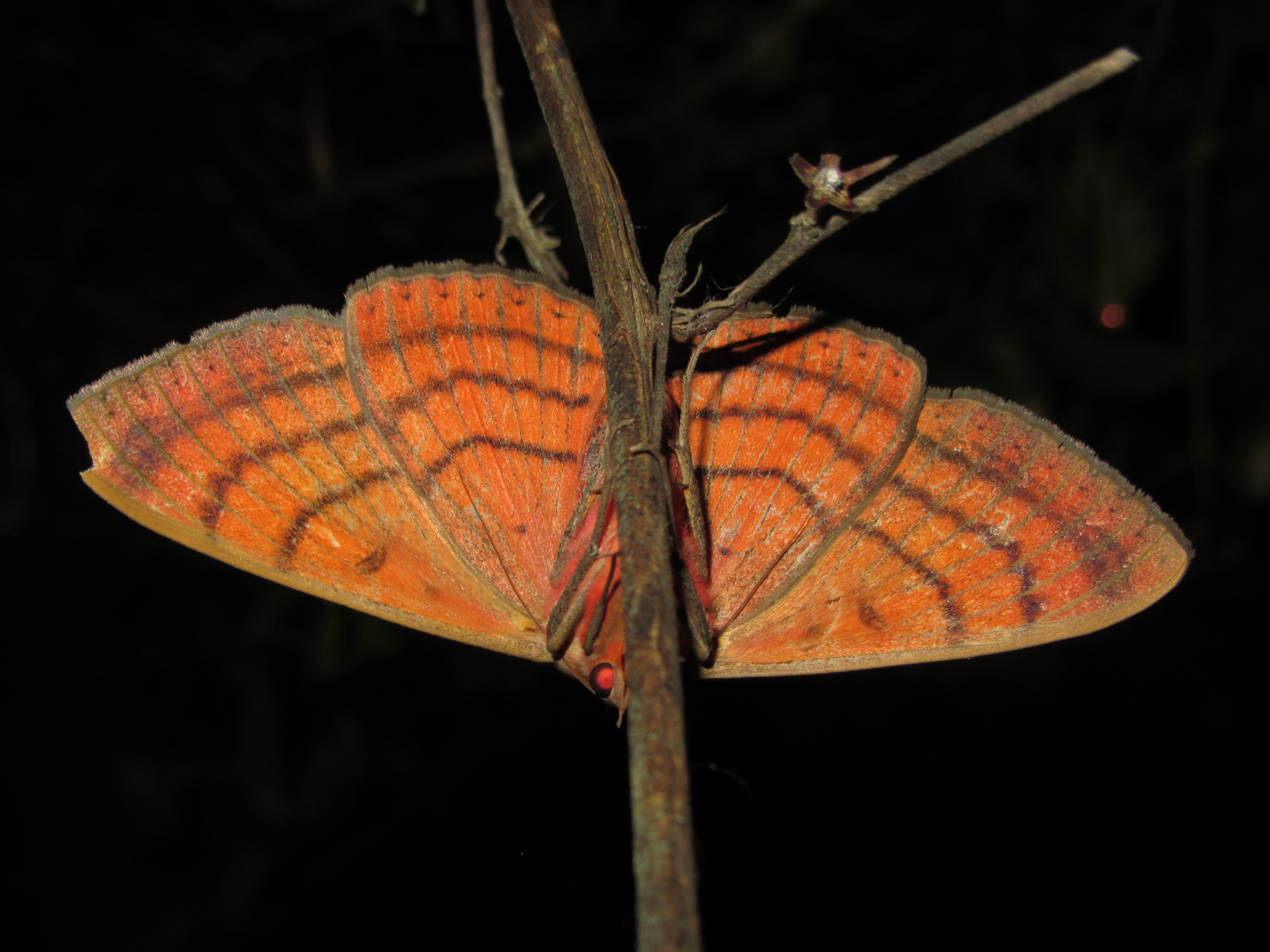

Scientific classification
- Kingdom: Animalia
- Phylum: Arthropoda
- Clade: Pancrustacea
- Class: Insecta
- Order: Lepidoptera
- Superfamily: Noctuoidea
- Family: Erebidae
- Genus: Spirama
- Species: S. retorta

Binomial name
- Spirama retorta (Clerck, 1764)

Synonyms
- Phalaena retorta Clerck, 1764; Noctua spiralis Fabricius, 1775; Erebus chimista Kollar, 1844; Spirama isabella Guenée, 1852; Spirama suffumosa Guenée, 1852; Spiramia cohaerens Walker, 1858; Hypopyra martha Butler, 1878; Spirama simplicior Butler, 1881; Spirama inaequalis Butler, 1883; Spirama jinchuena Butler, 1883

= Spirama retorta =

Indian owlet-moth

Species of moth

Spirama retorta, the Indian owlet-moth, is a moth of the family Erebidae. The species was first described by Carl Alexander Clerck in 1764. It is found in China (Tibet, Qinghai, Jiangsu, Fukien, Yunnan), Korea, Japan (Honshu), India (Sikkim, West Bengal), Nepal, Bangladesh, Thailand, Cambodia, Myanmar, Vietnam, Taiwan, Sri Lanka, Malaysia, the Philippines (Luzon), Indonesia (Java, Sulawesi), Japan (Ryukyu Islands).

== Description ==
The wingspan of the male is about 64–76 mm and 66-88 in female. The pattern on the wings often looks like the face of a snake with slightly opened mouth. Forewings with arched costa towards apex, which is nearly rectangular. Male with a fold on inner area of hindwing, containing an erectile ridge of very long hair. Antennae fasciculate. Male has dark chestnut-brown colored head and collar. Thorax paler with dark bands. Abdomen crimson with triangular black dorsal patches. Wings fuscous brown. Forewing with the costal and outer area more or less suffused with purplish and sometimes with an olive tinge. An antemedial line curved outwards below costa, and then oblique to inner margin. There is a large "inverted-comma" mark beyond end of cell, with ochreous and black edges and some white on inner edge of "tail", the center fuscous-black. A postmedial curved line passing round the stigma or interrupted by it. Another postmedial line excurved below costa and slightly sinuous. Two crenulate sub-marginal line and two more prominent lines can be found within the margin. Hindwings with indistinct antemedial, medial, and traces of two postmedial and a sub-marginal line. Ventral side is suffused with dull red and having two medial lines and single postmedial to each wing.

Female basically ochreous colored. Forewings with larger stigma than male. Hindwings with prominent markings. Two antemedial lines and an ochreous submarginal line can be seen along with two crenulate black lines inside the margin. Ventral side orange-scarlet colored, each wing with cell-spot, medial, postmedial and submarginal lines and series of lunules inside the margin.

The caterpillars are known to feed on Acacia mangium, which was investigated from Peninsular Malaysia. Predators like Sycanus leucomesus, Cantheconidea furcellata, Mallada basalis, and Vespa affinis are observed to feed on the caterpillars. Caterpillars also feed on Acacia auriculiformis, Acacia crassicarpa, and Falcataria moluccana.

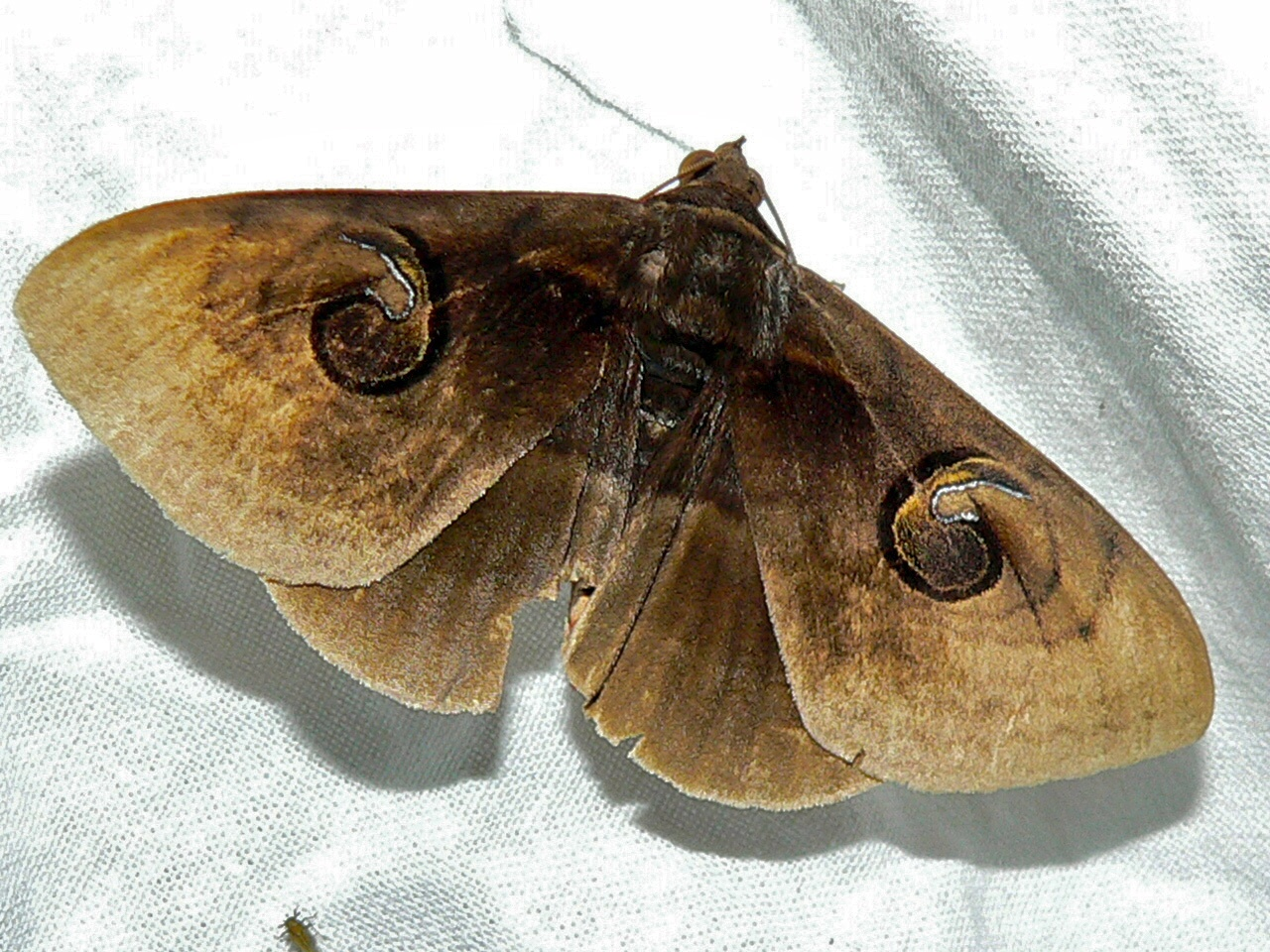
Dark form

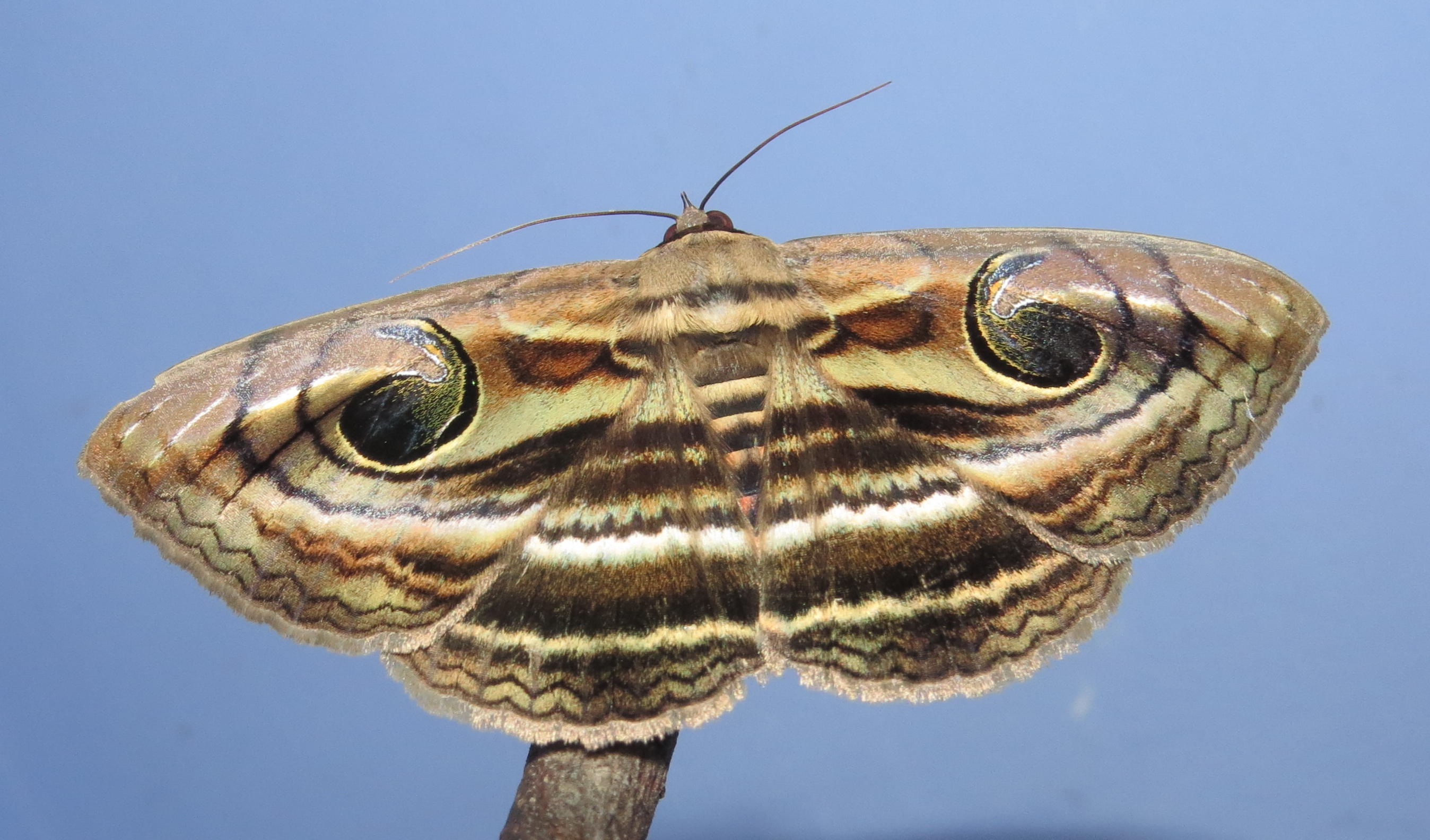
Common pale form

== See also ==
- Deception in animals§Deimatic displays
