= Longinos Navás =

Spanish priest and entomologist (1858–1938)

Longinos Navás Ferrer
- Born: 7 March 1858; Cabacés, Tarragona, Spain
- Died: 31 December 1938 (aged 80); Girona, Spain
- Scientific career
- Fields: Botany, entomology
- Author abbrev. (botany): Navás
- Author abbrev. (zoology): Navás

Longinos Navás (7 March 1858 Cabacés, Tarragona – 31 December 1938 Girona) was a Spanish entomologist who specialised in Plecoptera and Neuropteroidea.

Father Longinos Navás was a Jesuit priest. He published extensively on the Neuroptera fauna of Spain in Memorias de la Real. Academia Ciencias y Artes de Barcelona. His papers on worldwide fauna are published in this, other Spanish, German, Italian and American entomological journals. Navás described very many new species. His Neuroptera are in the Museu de Ciències Naturals, Museum of Natural Sciences, Barcelona. His Lepidoptera collections are in Museo Paleontologico de la Universidad de Zaragoza, Zaragoza.

== Later taxonomic work ==
Some taxa described by Navás, particularly within Psocoptera, were revised by later authors. Martin Meinander (1979) re-examined European Psocoptera attributed to Navás and synonymized several species that were found not to be taxonomically distinct. These revisions were later incorporated into global catalogues of Psocoptera, including the Psocoptera (Insecta): World Catalogue and Bibliography by Charles Lienhard and Edward L. Smithers (2002). What the revisionary literature shows Longinos Navás

When Navás established the genus Valenzuela in 1924, he introduced the genus name and placed several newly described species of his own within it. Subsequent taxonomic studies re-evaluated these classifications. Martin Meinander (1979) reviewed European Psocoptera attributed to Navás and demonstrated that several species placed in Valenzuela were not taxonomically distinct, were incorrectly assigned at the genus level, or represented earlier described species under different names. As a result, these taxa were treated as junior synonyms or transferred to other genera.

Later catalogues, including the global synthesis by Lienhard and Smithers (2002), adopted these revisions and reflected the resulting changes in the composition of the genus Valenzuela.

Several species currently retained in Valenzuela were originally described by earlier authors, such as Valenzuela flavidus (Stephens, 1836) and Valenzuela subflavus (Rambur, 1842), and their placement within the genus has been maintained following later revisionary work.
