= Peter Esben-Petersen =

Danish entomologist (1869–1942)

Peter Esben-Petersen (18 December 1869, in Sverup near Silkeborg – 2 April 1942, in Silkeborg) was a Danish entomologist who specialised in Neuroptera across the world. He was also interested in the Orthoptera, Ephemeroptera and other insects of Denmark.

Esben-Petersen was a teacher in Silkeborg. He was associated with the entomological series Danmarks Flora og Fauna. For his scientific work on world fauna he received an honorary degree from the University of Copenhagen. His insect collection is largely conserved in the Zoological Museum in Copenhagen, with a part in the Natural History Museum in Aarhus da:Naturhistorisk Museum).

== Works ==
Partial list

- — (1902), "Bidrag til en Fortegnelse over Arktisk Norges Neuropterfauna I". Tromsø Museums Aarshefter (25): 119 – 153
- — (1908–09), "Bidrag til en Fortegnelse over Arktisk Norges Neuropterfauna II." Tromsø Museums Aarshefter, (31/32): 75 – 89
- — (1915), "Australian Neuroptera. Part ii", Proceedings of the Linnean Society of New South Wales, 40: 56–74, doi:10.5962/bhl.part.18863, ISSN 0370-047X, Wikidata Q110158783
- — (1927), "New Species of Neuroptera Planipennia in British Collections", Proceedings of the Zoological Society of London, 97 (3): 549–551, doi:10.1111/j.1469-7998.1927.tb07427.x, ISSN 0370-2774, Wikidata Q103836209
- — (1933), Bidrag til en Fortegnelse over Bornholms Insektfauna: Orthoptera, Plecoptera, Ephemeroptera, Odonata, Copeognatha, Neuroptera, Mecoptera, Trichoptera.Entomologiske Meddelelser 18: 215–238
