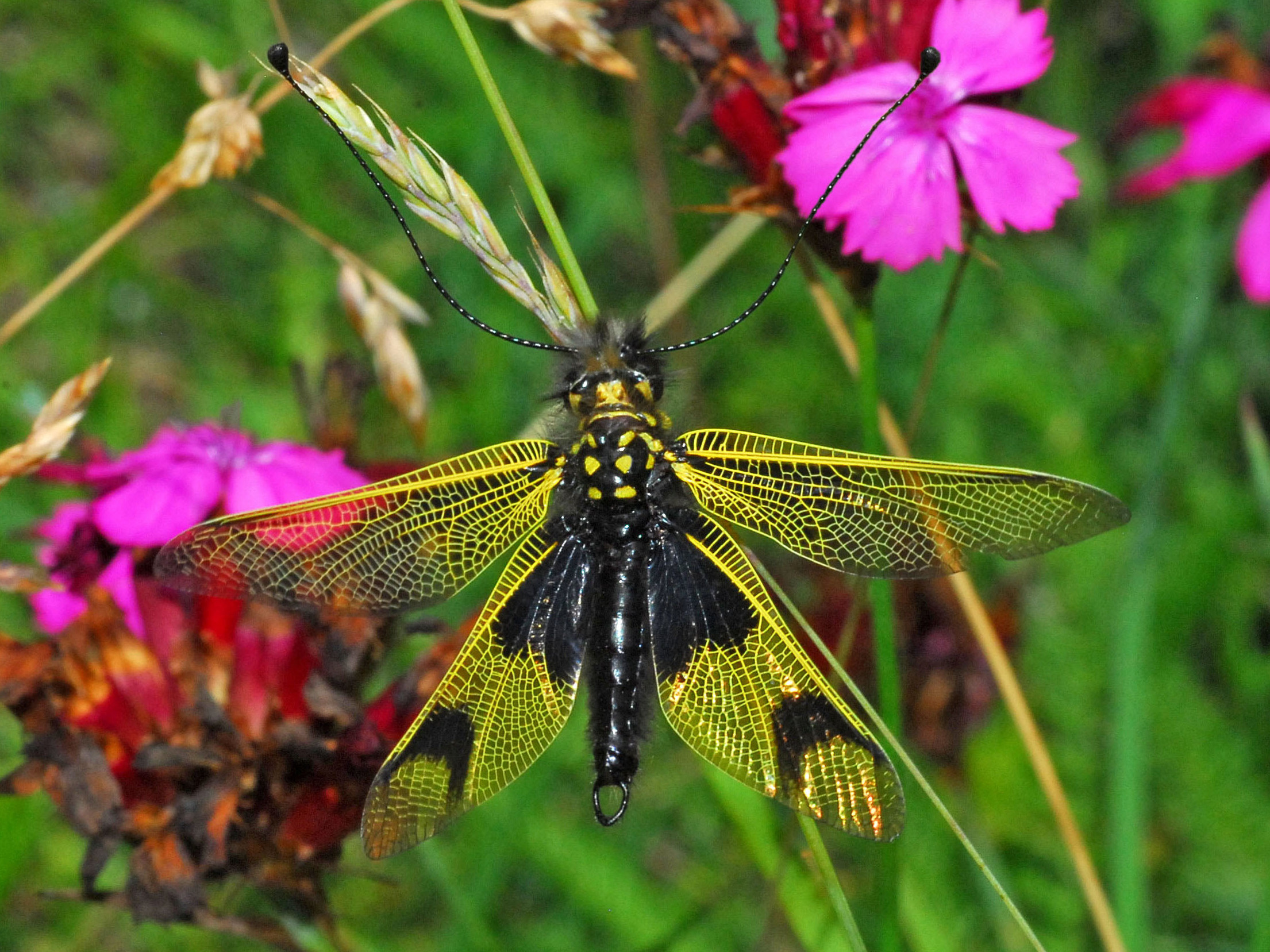
- Libelloides longicornis. Male

Scientific classification
- Domain: Eukaryota
- Kingdom: Animalia
- Phylum: Arthropoda
- Class: Insecta
- Order: Neuroptera
- Family: Ascalaphidae
- Genus: Libelloides
- Species: L. longicornis

Binomial name
- Libelloides longicornis (Scopoli, 1763)

Synonyms
- List: Hemerobius longicornis Scopoli, 1763; Ascalaphus bolivari van der Weele, 1909; Ascalaphus c-nigrum Latreille, 1807; Ascalaphus longicornis (Linnaeus, 1764); Ascalaphus longicornis c-disjunctu s Puisségur, 1967; Ascalaphus longicornis montanu s Monserrat, 1977; Hemerobius longicornis Linnaeus, 1764; Libelloides longicornis aspoeckiaspoeckaeque Aistleitner, 1980; Libelloides longicornis boixolsius Aistleitner, 1980; Libelloides longicornis bolivari Aistleitner, 1980; Libelloides longicornis longicornis (Linnaeus, 1764); Libelloides longicornis penibeticus Aistleitner, 1980; Libelloides longicornis ramiroi Aistleitner, 1980; Libelloides longicornis veronensis Aistleitner, 1981; Myrmeleon longicornis (Linnaeus, 1764)

= Libelloides longicornis =

Species of insect

Libelloides longicornis, common name black yellow owlfly, is an owlfly species belonging to the family Ascalaphidae, subfamily Ascalaphinae.

== Distribution and habitat ==
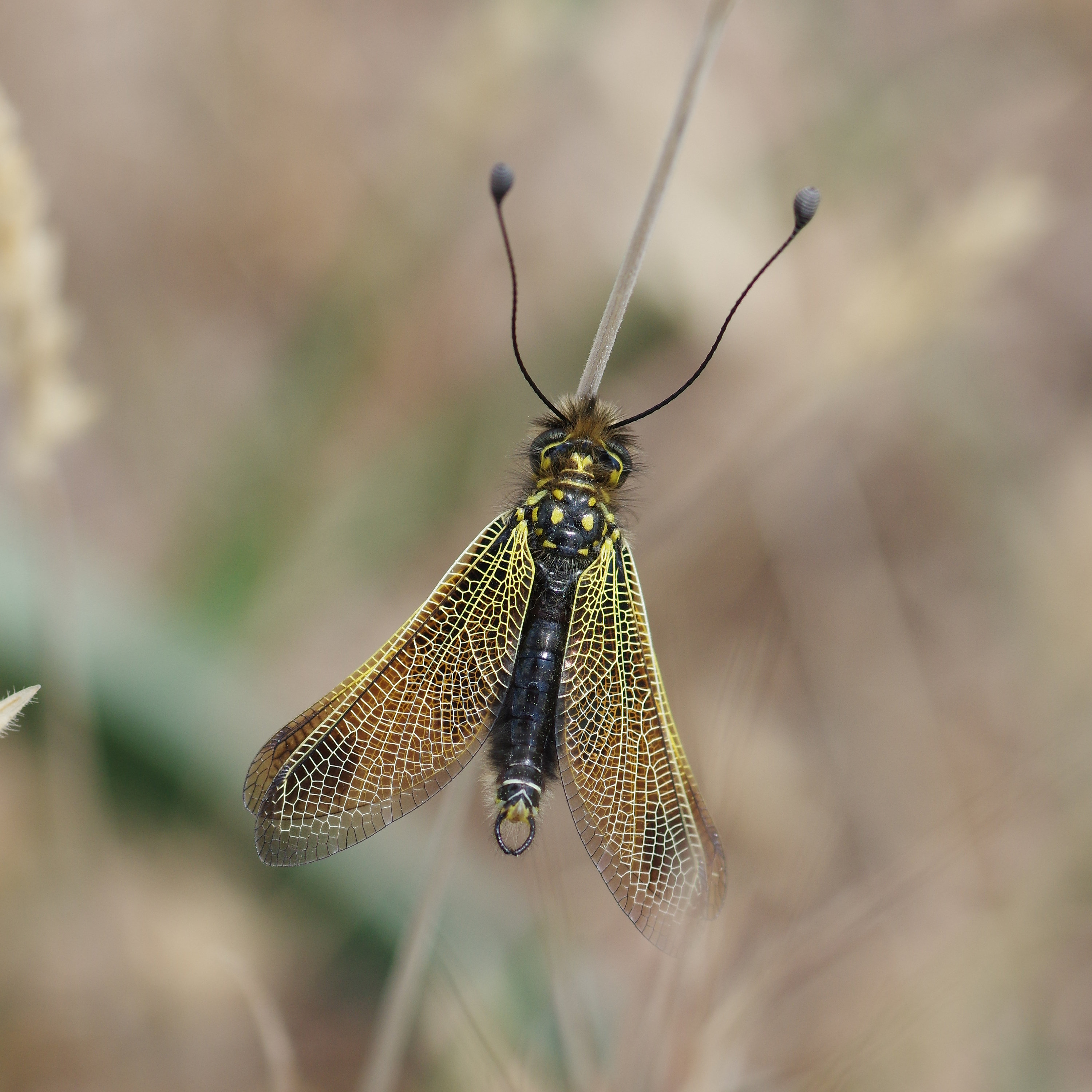

This species is present in South Western Europe (France, Germany, Italy, Portugal, Spain and Switzerland). These insects mainly occur in the sunny meadows at rather high elevation.

== Description ==
Libelloides longicornis can reach a length of 25–30 mm (0.98–1.18 in) and a wingspan of 38–58 mm (1.5–2.3 in). The body of these large owlflies is black, quite hairy, with some yellow markings. Also the head is black, with large compound eyes. The long sturdy black antennae are clubbed.

The wings do not have scales, are partly transparent and show a network of translucent lemon yellow ribs. In the fore wings appears a small basal dark spot reaching the base of the wings.

The hind wings have a characteristic squared dark area towards the apex and a dark triangular sickle-shaped spot pointing to the wing tip.

The wings are usually held spread in sunny areas, as in dragonflies, but when they are at rest they fold their roof-shaped wings over their abdomen.

This species is rather similar to Libelloides coccajus, but in Libelloides longicornis the basal black area of the hind wings does not reach the anal angle.

== Biology ==
Adults can be encountered from June through August. They are diurnal predators of other small flying insects. Usually they fly between 2 meters and 3 meters high to catch their prey, preferably hunted under bright light conditions.

The mating usually takes place in the late morning or at noon, when these insects are warmed by the sun. The male grabs after a short fight the female with the pincers located at the top of the abdomen. The females then lay their white eggs on stems of herbaceous plants in closely spaced double rows. Larvae resemble those of antlions, but they do not dig cavities in the ground.

== Bibliography ==
- Aistleitner, E. (1981) Eine neue Unterart von Libelloides longicornis (L.) aus den Südostalpen (Neuropteroidea, Planipennia, Ascalaphidae)., Entomofauna 2:191-202. (in German)
- Heiko Bellmann: Der Neue Kosmos Insektenführer, S. 134, Franckh-Kosmos Verlags-GmbH & Co, Stuttgart 1999, ISBN 3-440-07682-2
- Michael Chinery, Parey's book of insects. A field guide of European insects - Stuttgart 2004, ISBN 3-440-09969-5.
- Monserrat, V. J. (1977) Una nueva variedad de Ascalaphus longicornis L. en el sureste de España (Neuropt. Ascalaphidae)., Graellsia 31:187-192. (in Spanish)
- Oswald J.D., LDL Neuropterida Species of the World.
