= Split-eyed owlfly =

Split-eyed owlfly refers to one of two tribes of the neuropteran owlfly family:

- Ascalaphini
- Ululodini
