= Ululodes arizonensis =

Scientific classification
- Domain: Eukaryota
- Kingdom: Animalia
- Phylum: Arthropoda
- Class: Insecta
- Order: Neuroptera
- Family: Ascalaphidae
- Genus: Ululodes
- Species: U. arizonensis

Binomial name
- Ululodes arizonensis Banks, 1907

Species of insect

Ululodes arizonensis is a species of owlfly in the tribe Ululodini. It is found in Central America and North America.
