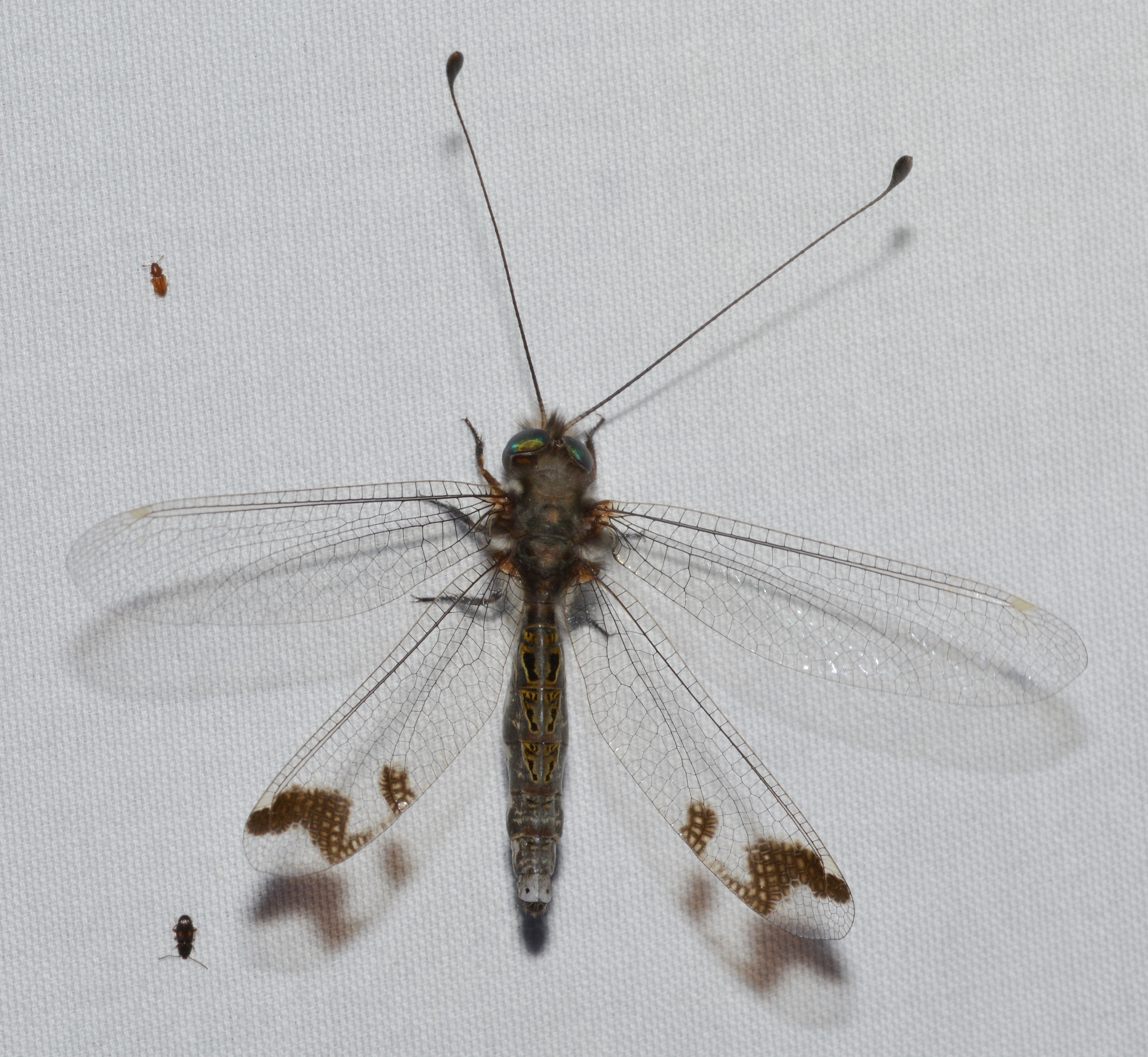
- U. quadripunctatus photographed in Missouri

Scientific classification
- Domain: Eukaryota
- Kingdom: Animalia
- Phylum: Arthropoda
- Class: Insecta
- Order: Neuroptera
- Family: Ascalaphidae
- Genus: Ululodes
- Species: U. quadripunctatus

Binomial name
- Ululodes quadripunctatus (Burmeister, 1839)

= Ululodes quadripunctatus =

Species of owlfly

Ululodes quadripunctatus, the four-spotted owlfly, is a species of owlfly in the tribe Ululodini. It is found in Central America and North America.
