= Ululodes floridanus =

Scientific classification
- Domain: Eukaryota
- Kingdom: Animalia
- Phylum: Arthropoda
- Class: Insecta
- Order: Neuroptera
- Family: Ascalaphidae
- Genus: Ululodes
- Species: U. floridanus

Binomial name
- Ululodes floridanus (Banks, 1906)

Species of owlfly

Ululodes floridanus is a species of owlfly in the tribe Ululodini. It is found in North America.
