= Ululodes bicolor =

Scientific classification
- Domain: Eukaryota
- Kingdom: Animalia
- Phylum: Arthropoda
- Class: Insecta
- Order: Neuroptera
- Family: Ascalaphidae
- Genus: Ululodes
- Species: U. bicolor

Binomial name
- Ululodes bicolor (Banks, 1895)

Species of owlfly

Ululodes bicolor is a species of owlfly in the tribe Ululodini. It is found in Central America and North America.
