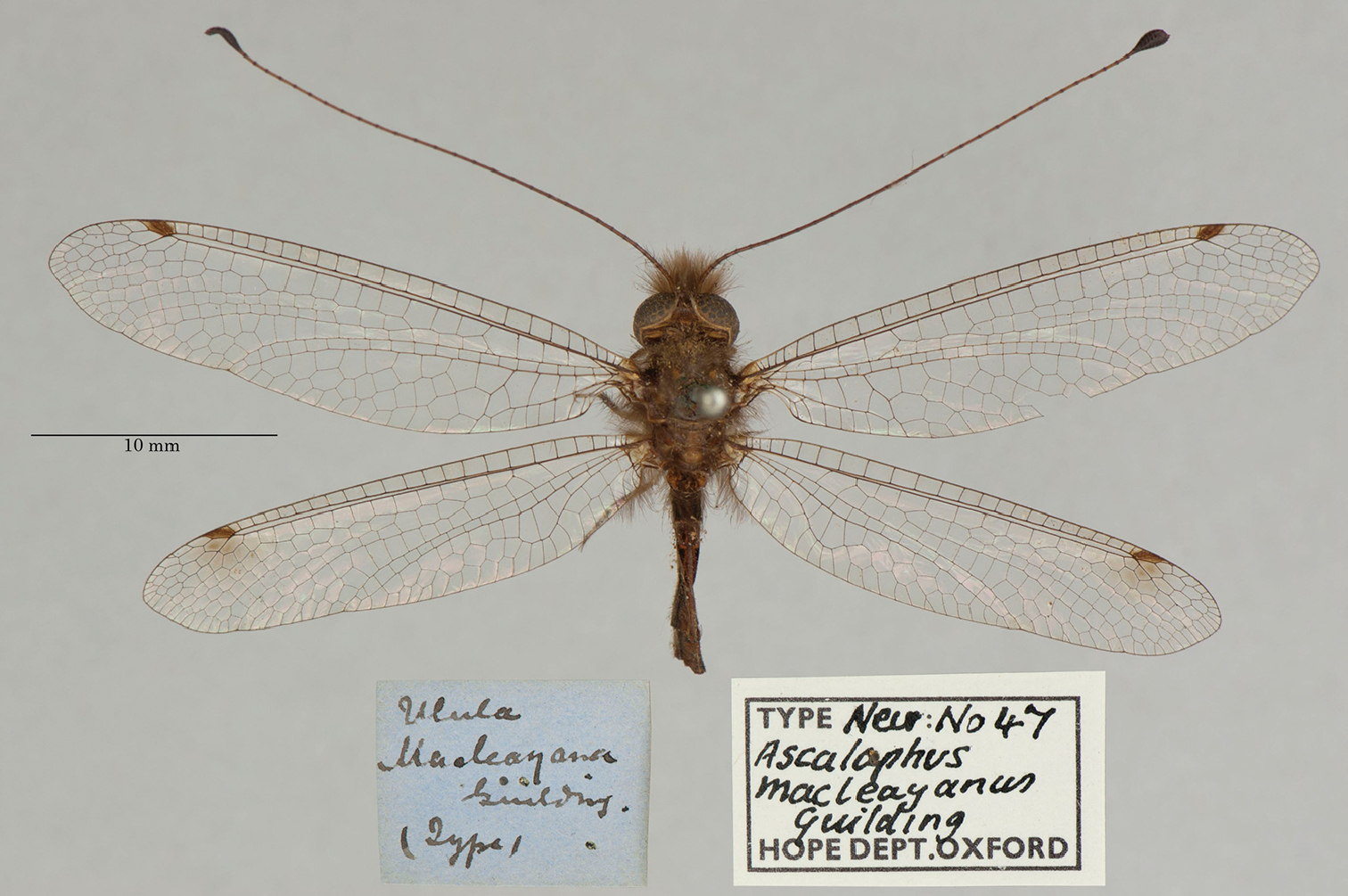
- U. macleayanus syntype

Scientific classification
- Domain: Eukaryota
- Kingdom: Animalia
- Phylum: Arthropoda
- Class: Insecta
- Order: Neuroptera
- Family: Ascalaphidae
- Genus: Ululodes
- Species: U. macleayanus

Binomial name
- Ululodes macleayanus (Guilding, 1823)

Synonyms
- Ululodes senex (Burmeister, 1839)

= Ululodes macleayanus =

Species of insect

Ululodes macleayanus is a species of owlfly in the tribe Ululodini. It is found in the Caribbean Sea, Central America, North America, and South America.

== Subspecies ==
These two subspecies belong to the species Ululodes macleayanus:

- Ululodes macleayanus macleayanus (Guilding, 1823)
- Ululodes macleayanus sanctaeluciae Van der Weele, 1909
