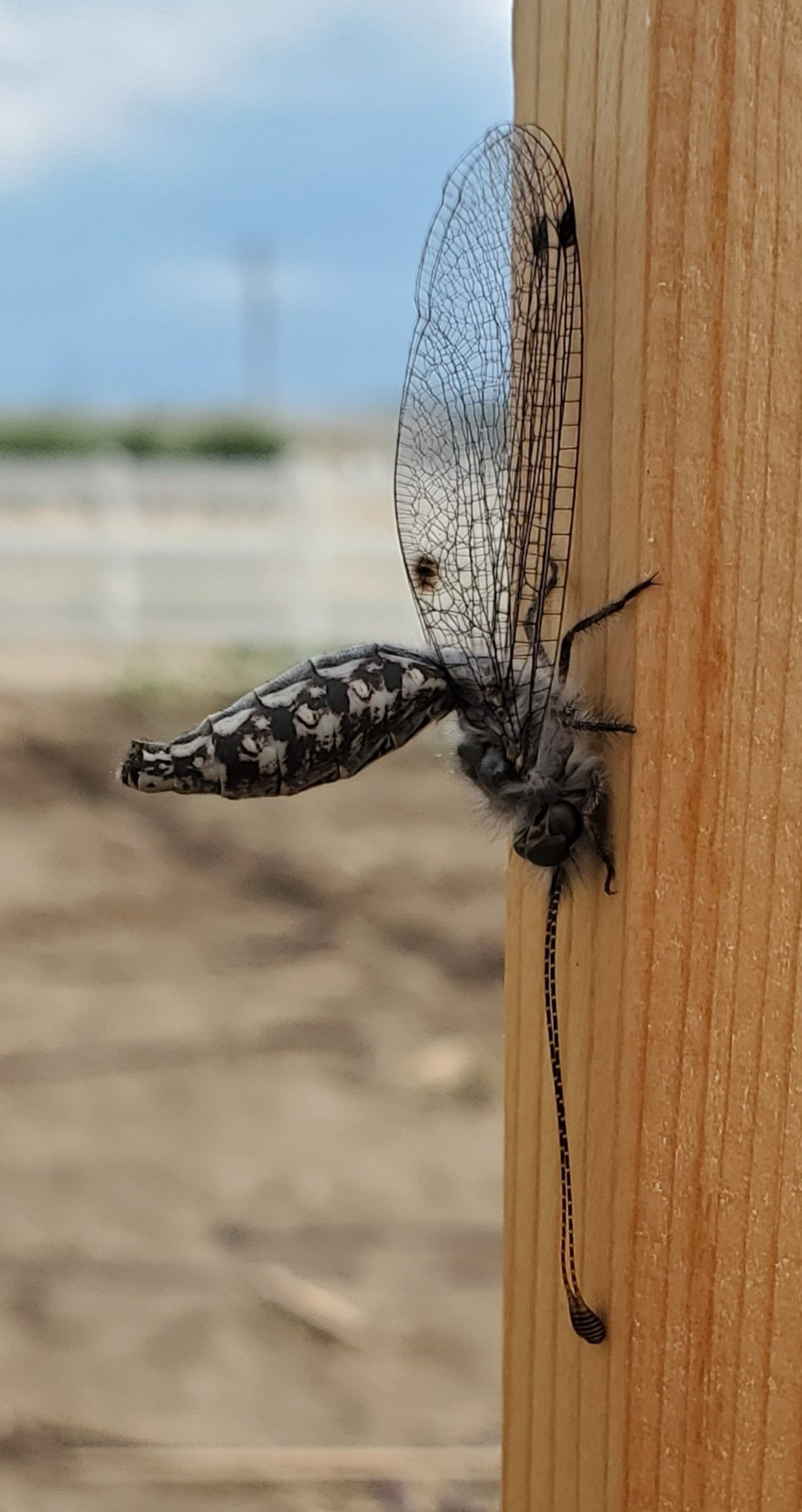
- Ululodes mexicanus in hunting posture

Scientific classification
- Domain: Eukaryota
- Kingdom: Animalia
- Phylum: Arthropoda
- Class: Insecta
- Order: Neuroptera
- Family: Ascalaphidae
- Genus: Ululodes
- Species: U. mexicanus

Binomial name
- Ululodes mexicanus (McLachlan, 1871)

= Ululodes mexicanus =

Species of owlfly

Ululodes mexicanus is a species of owlfly in the tribe Ululodini. It is found in Central America.
