= Cordulecerus =

Scientific classification
- Kingdom: Animalia
- Phylum: Arthropoda
- Clade: Pancrustacea
- Class: Insecta
- Order: Neuroptera
- Family: Ascalaphidae
- Subfamily: Ululodinae
- Genus: Cordulecerus; Rambur, 1842

Species
- 10 species (see text)

Genus of insects

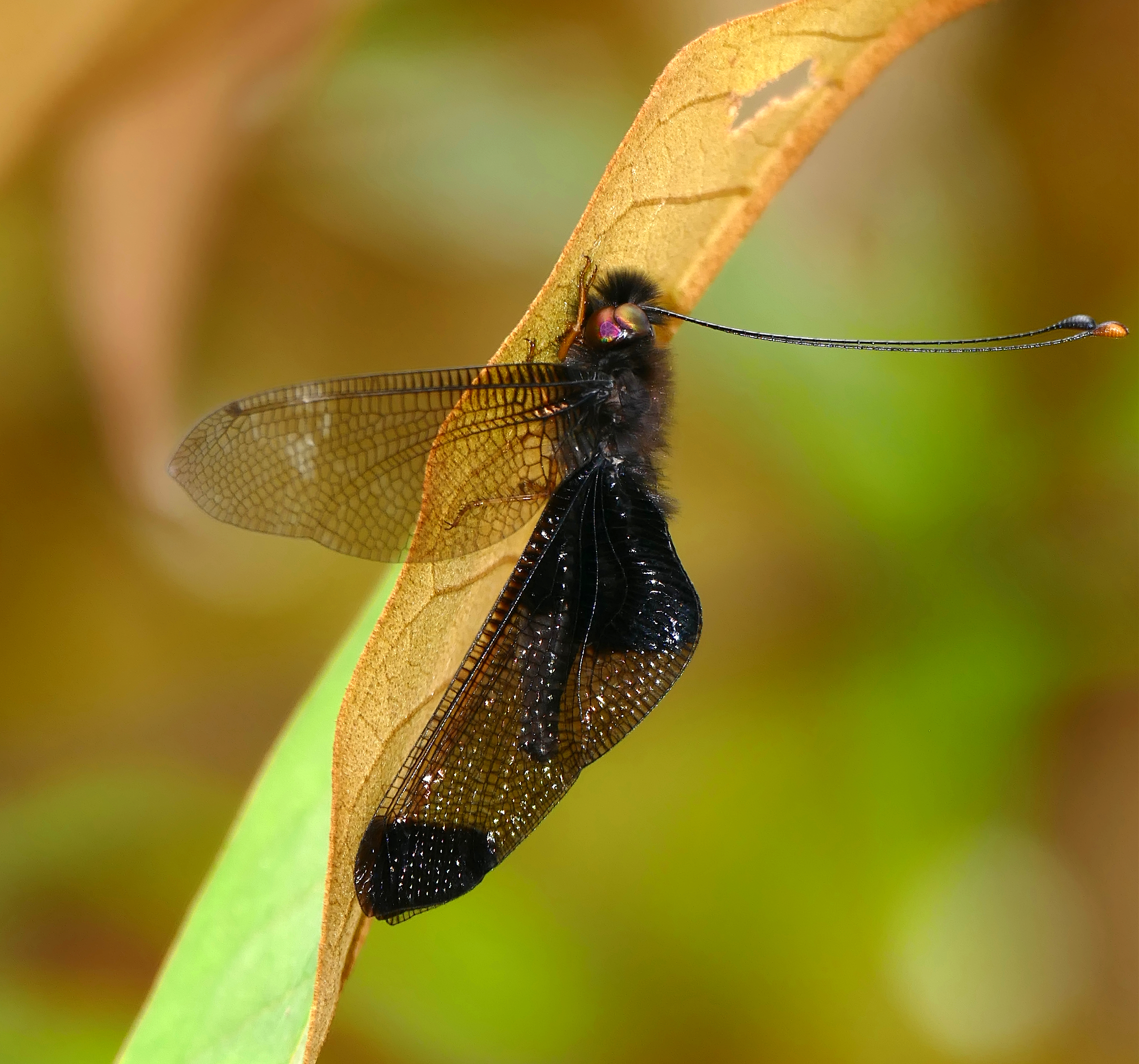
Cordulecerus maclachlani in Roura, French Guyana

Cordulecerus is a genus of owlflies, neuropteran insects in the subfamily Ascalaphinae. Species are found in Central and South America.

== Species ==
The ten species in this genus include:

- Cordulecerus alopecinus (Burmeister, 1839)
- Cordulecerus dohrni van der Weele, 1909
- Cordulecerus elegans van der Weele, 1909
- Cordulecerus inquinatus Gerstaecker, 1888
- Cordulecerus maclachlani Sélys-Lonchamps, 1871
- Cordulecerus mexicanus van der Weele, 1909
- Cordulecerus praecellens (Gerstaecker, 1885)
- Cordulecerus subiratus (Walker, 1853)
  - Cordulecerus subiratus meridionalis van der Weele, 1909
  - Cordulecerus subiratus subiratus (Walker, 1853)
- Cordulecerus surinamensis (Fabricius, 1798)
- Cordulecerus unicus (Walker, 1860)
