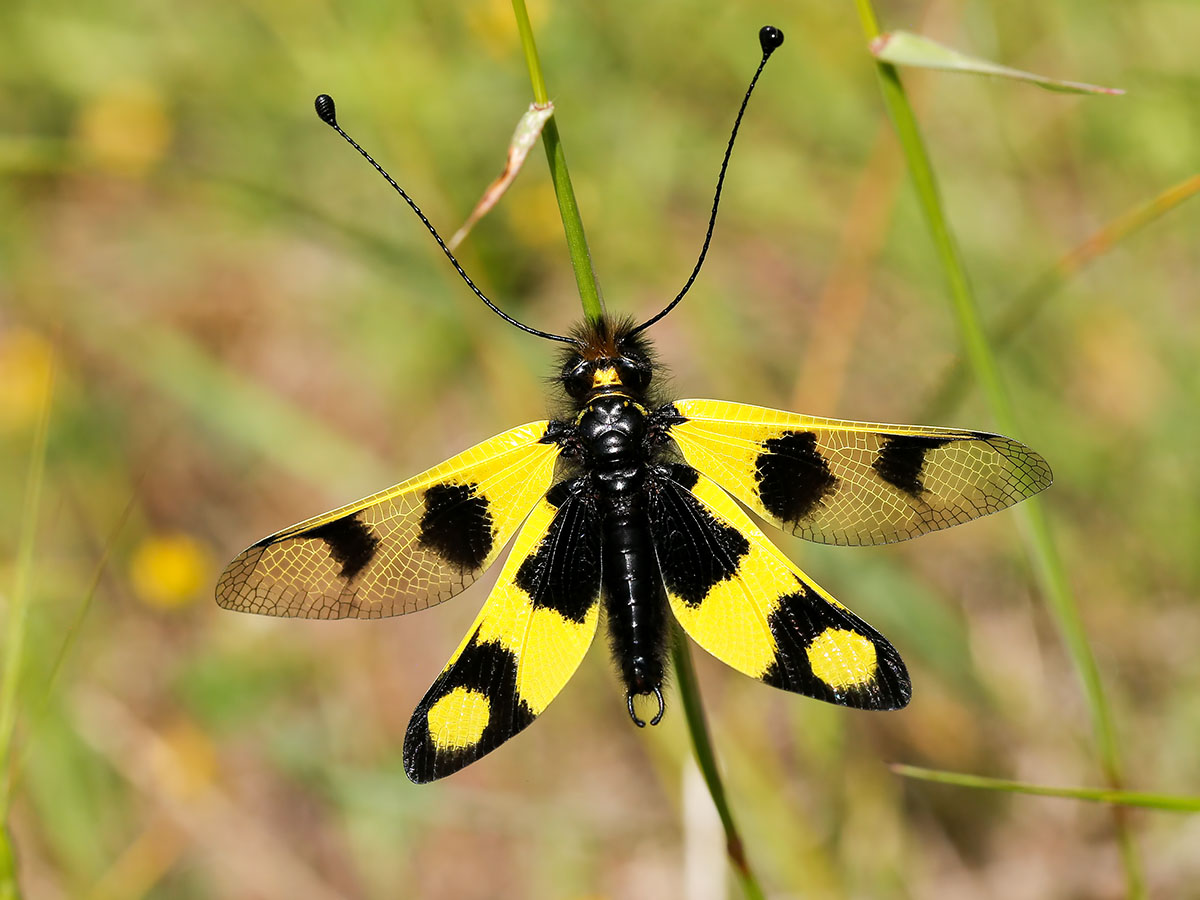
- Male
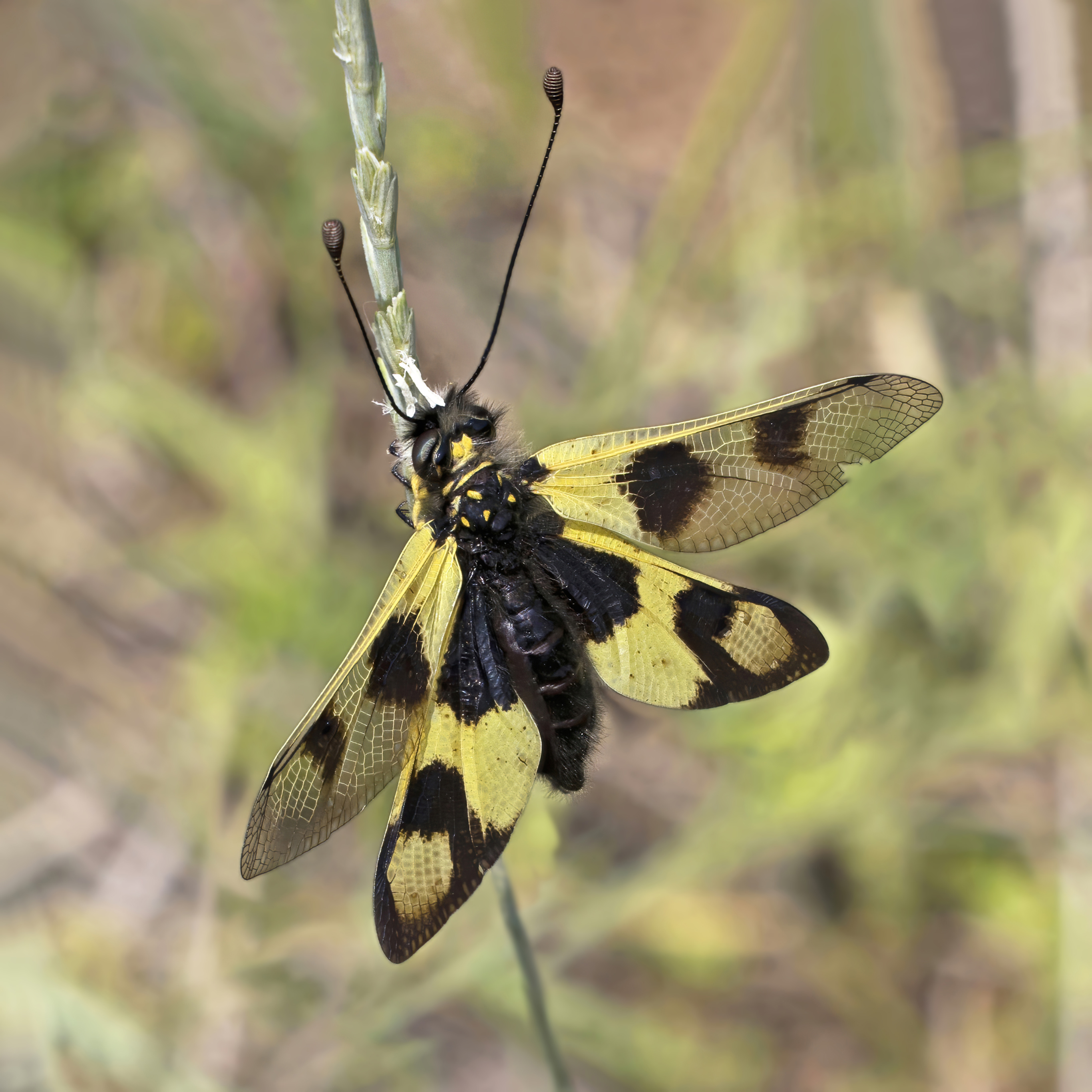
- Female

Scientific classification
- Kingdom: Animalia
- Phylum: Arthropoda
- Clade: Pancrustacea
- Class: Insecta
- Order: Neuroptera
- Family: Ascalaphidae
- Genus: Libelloides
- Species: L. macaronius

Binomial name
- Libelloides macaronius (Scopoli, 1763)

Synonyms
- Ascalaphus macaronius

= Libelloides macaronius =

Species of insect

Libelloides macaronius is a day-flying owlfly species of Europe and Asia. The genus belongs to the family Ascalaphidae, subfamily Ascalaphinae.

== Description ==
The adult is a large insect somewhat resembling a dragonfly. Its body, eyes, and long clubbed antennae are black; the wings are bright yellow, spotted with black, the forewings being partly transparent near the wingtips. The abdomen ends with a pair of hooked claspers in the male, a short ovipositor in the female. At rest, adults often perch like dragonflies with their wings outspread. They fly rapidly and rather straight over grass or bushes.

The species has the excellent eyesight of predatory day-flying insects, though the large eyes are of the superposition type normally found in nocturnal insects.

== Distribution and ecology ==
The species occurs in central, eastern, and southern Europe, and Palearctic Asia. They live in relatively open areas such as farm meadows and pasture, and wilder dry grassland and scrubland. Adults are fast-flying diurnal predators that use their legs to catch their prey in flight. They have robust mandibles, able to pierce the exoskeletons of heavily-sclerotised prey. They feed on a wide variety of other insects including aphids, beetles, hemipteran bugs, cockroaches, dipteran flies, and neuropterans. They are predated upon by insect-eating birds and spiders.

== Taxonomy ==
The species was named Libelloides macaronius by the Austrian naturalist Giovanni Antonio Scopoli in 1763. Among the many synonyms are Ascalaphus macaronius (Scopoli, 1763), Myrmeleon kolywanensis (Laxmann, 1770), and Ascalaphus oculatus (Brullé, 1832).

The species was depicted on postage stamps of Moldova and Ukraine.

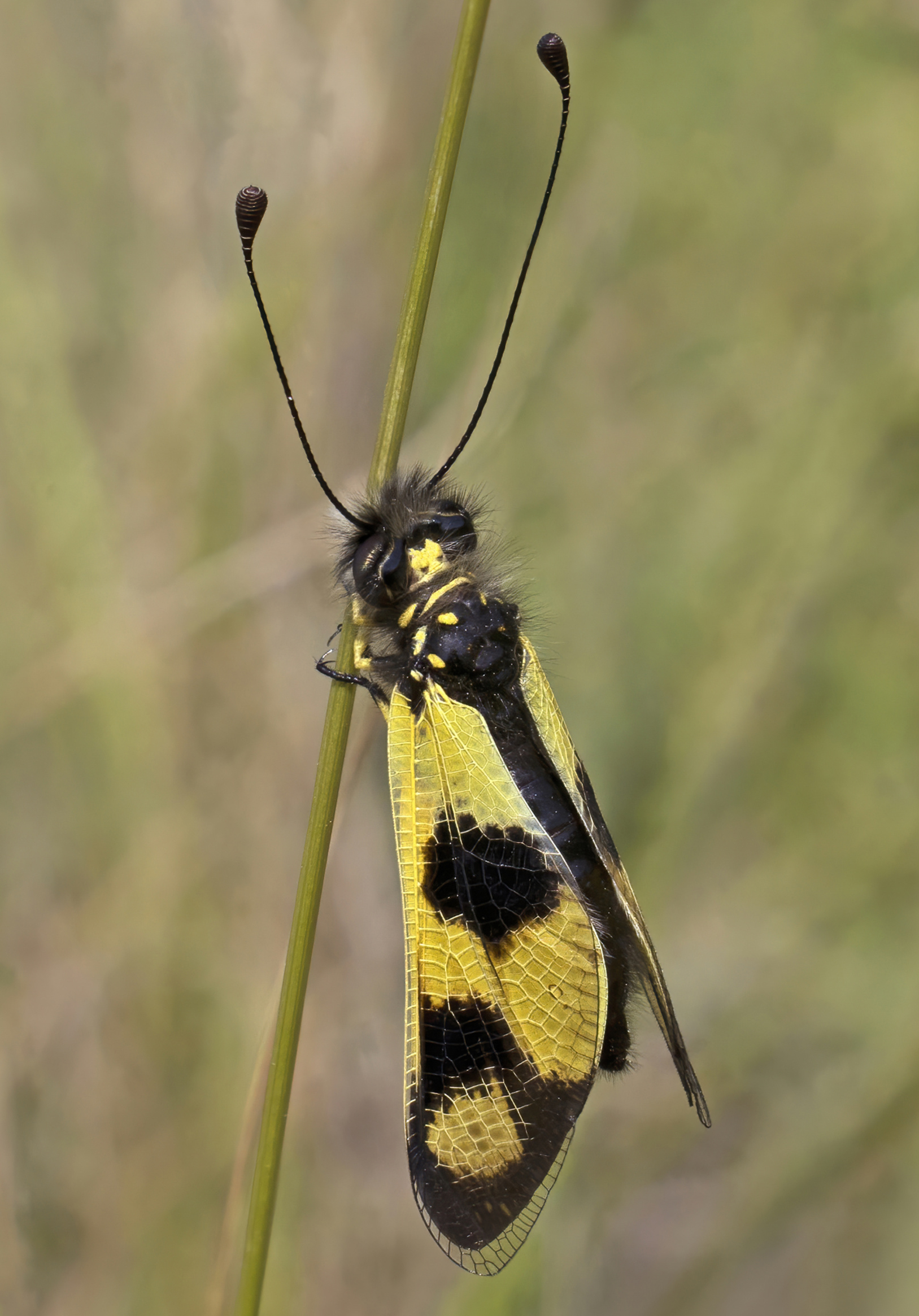
female with wings folded

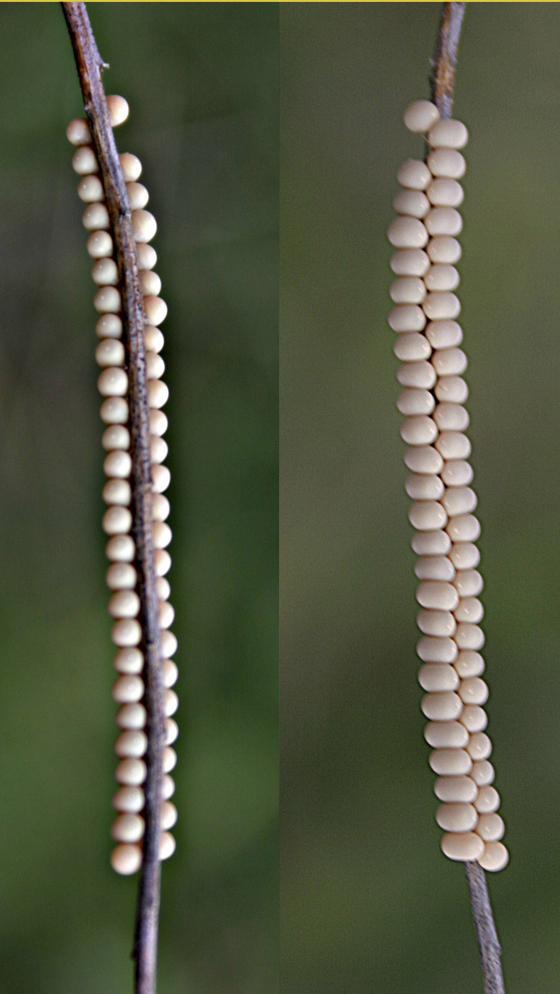
Eggs laid in rows on plant stalks

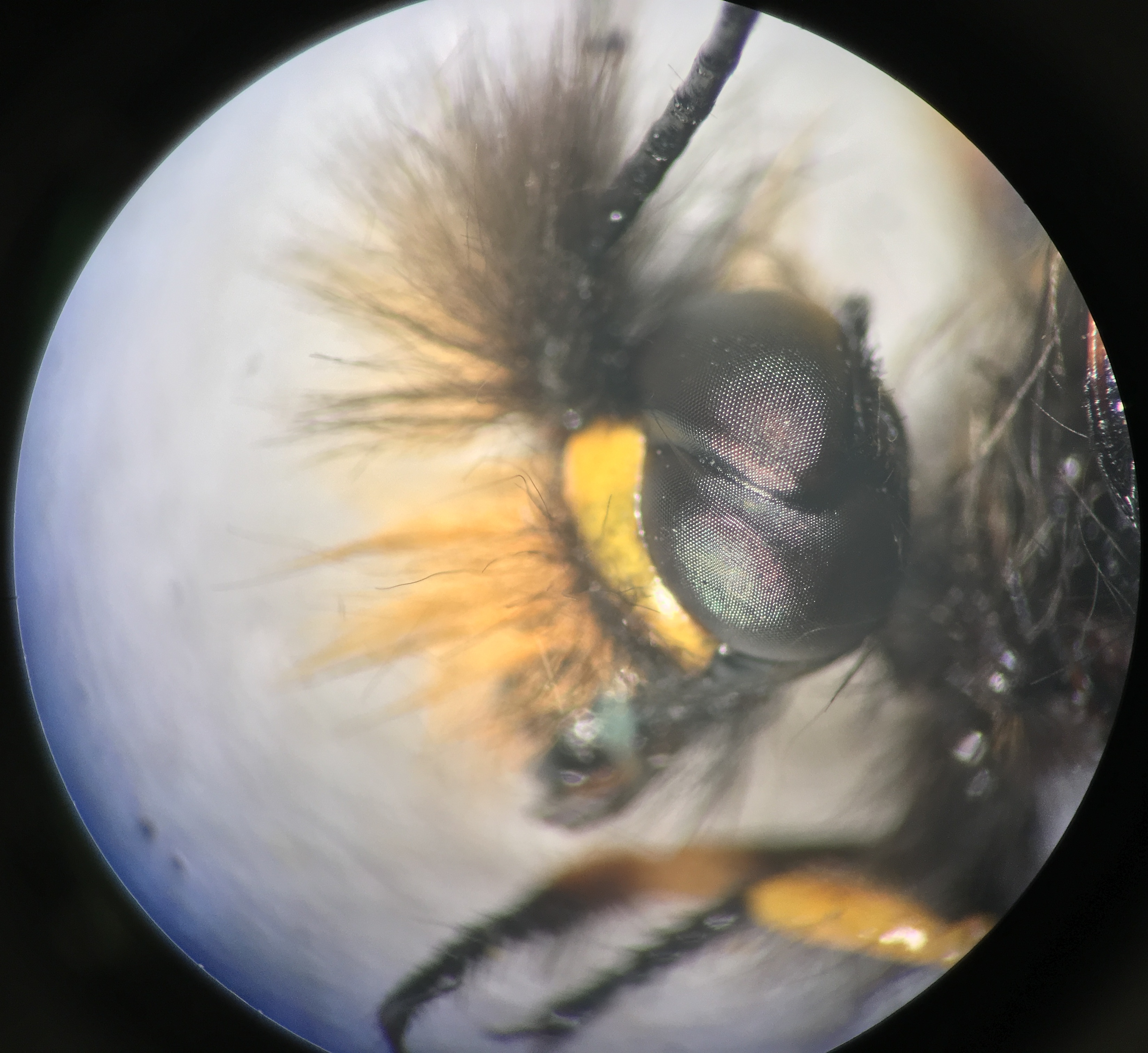
Head, showing large two-part compound eye

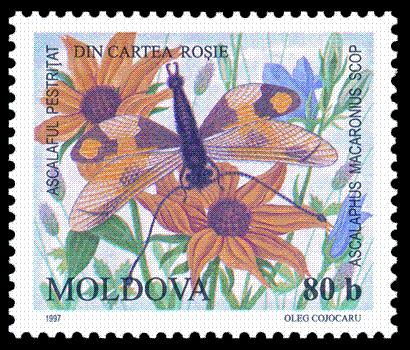
Adult on a 1997 Moldova postage stamp

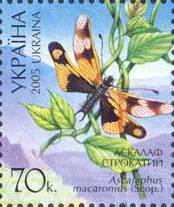
Adult on a 2005 Ukraine postage stamp
