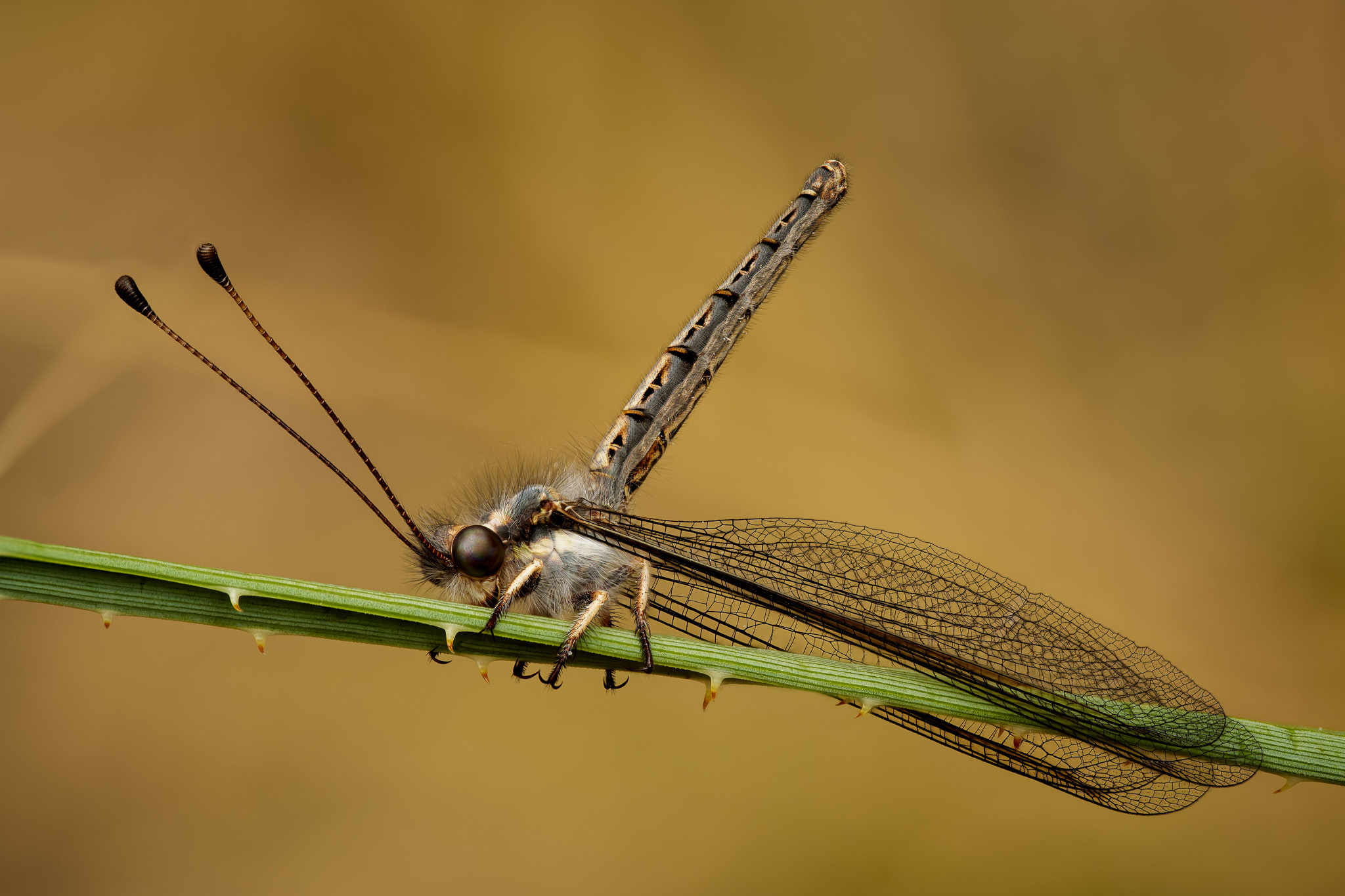

Scientific classification
- Kingdom: Animalia
- Phylum: Arthropoda
- Class: Insecta
- Order: Neuroptera
- Family: Ascalaphidae
- Genus: Ascaloptynx
- Species: A. appendiculata

Binomial name
- Ascaloptynx appendiculata (Fabricius, 1793)

= Ascaloptynx appendiculata =

Species of insect

Ascaloptynx appendiculata is a species of owlfly in the family Ascalaphidae. It is found in Central America and North America.
