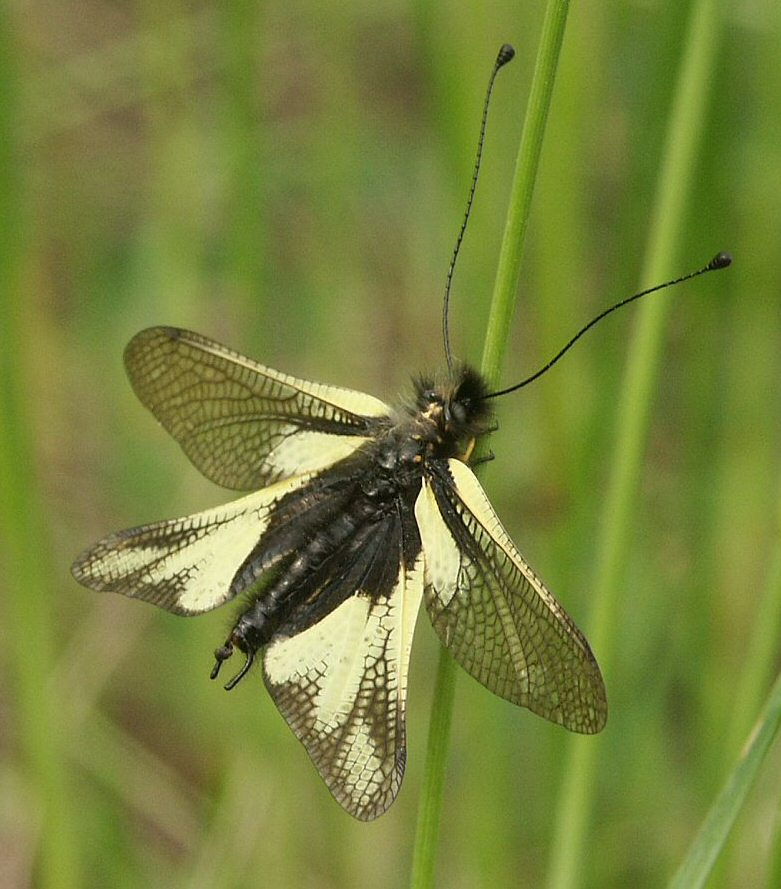
- Male

Scientific classification
- Kingdom: Animalia
- Phylum: Arthropoda
- Clade: Pancrustacea
- Class: Insecta
- Order: Neuroptera
- Family: Ascalaphidae
- Genus: Libelloides
- Species: L. coccajus

Binomial name
- Libelloides coccajus (Denis & Schiffermüller, 1775)

Synonyms
- Ascalaphus coccajus (Schiffermüller, 1776); Ascalaphus libelluloides (Schäffer, 1763); Libelloides italicus (Fabricius, 1781)

= Libelloides coccajus =

Species of insect

Libelloides coccajus, the "owly sulphur", is an owlfly species belonging to the family Ascalaphidae, subfamily Ascalaphinae.

== Distribution ==
This rare insect is present in France, Czech Republic, Germany, Italy, Spain and Switzerland.

== Habitat ==
These owlflies mainly inhabit areas with tall grass and sunny rocky slopes, at an elevation up to 1,500 metres (4,900 ft) above sea level. They have been sighted at elevations of up to 1,800 metres (5,900 ft) on the French/Italian border in the high Susa Valley.

== Description ==
The adults reach 25 millimetres (0.98 in) of length, with a wingspan of 45–55 millimetres (1.8–2.2 in). The body is black and quite hairy. The eyes are large and bulging; the antennae are long and clubbed. The wings do not have scales and are partly transparent, with bright yellow areas in the first third, dark brown on the external side. An elongated black area is present towards the end of the posterior edge of the wing. The venation is black. The wings are held spread at rest, as in dragonflies. This species is rather similar to Libelloides lacteus.

== Taxonomy ==
The Libelloides italicus type in the University of Copenhagen Zoological Museum does not correspond to any endemic species of Ascalaphidae living exclusively in the Italian Peninsula and it is now considered to be a junior synonym of Libelloides coccajus.

== Biology ==
Adults can be encountered from April through July. They are diurnal predators of other flying insects. Eggs are laid in groups on stems of herbaceous plants. Larvae are fearsome predators too. They lie on the soil surface waiting for prey. They live for about two years.

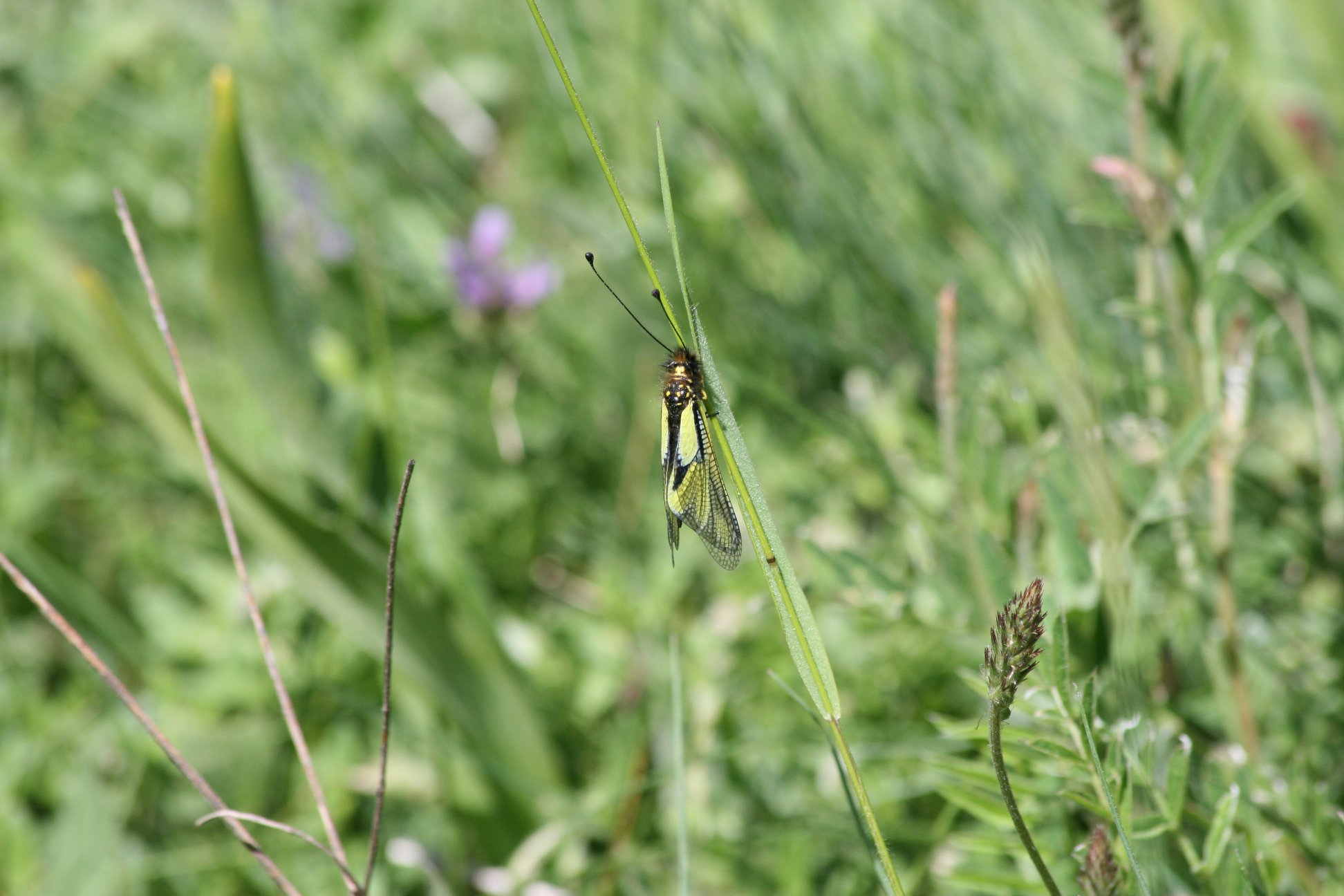
Owly Sulphur, Claviere, 1800amsl, Italy 2019

== Gallery ==
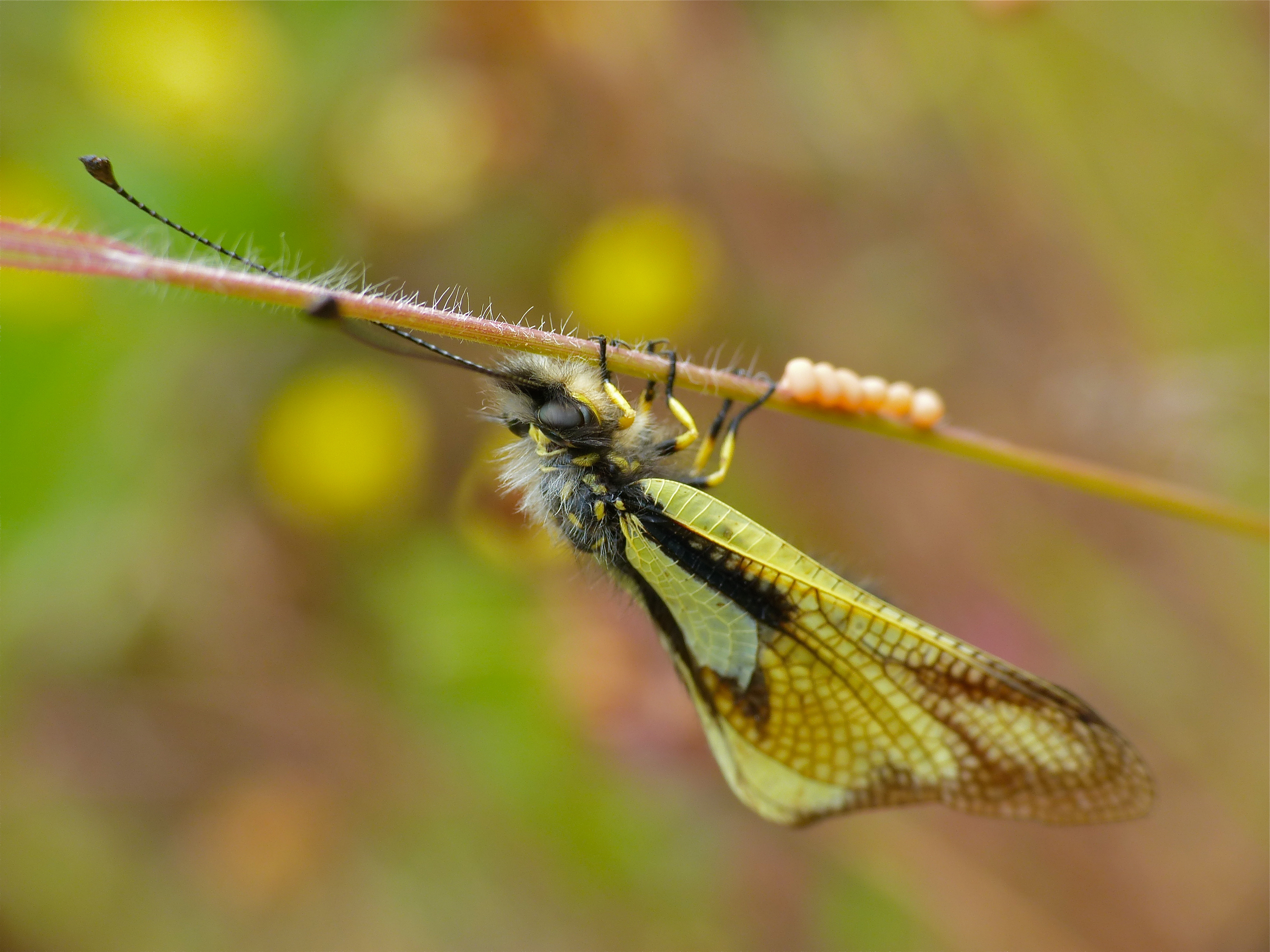
Female with eggs

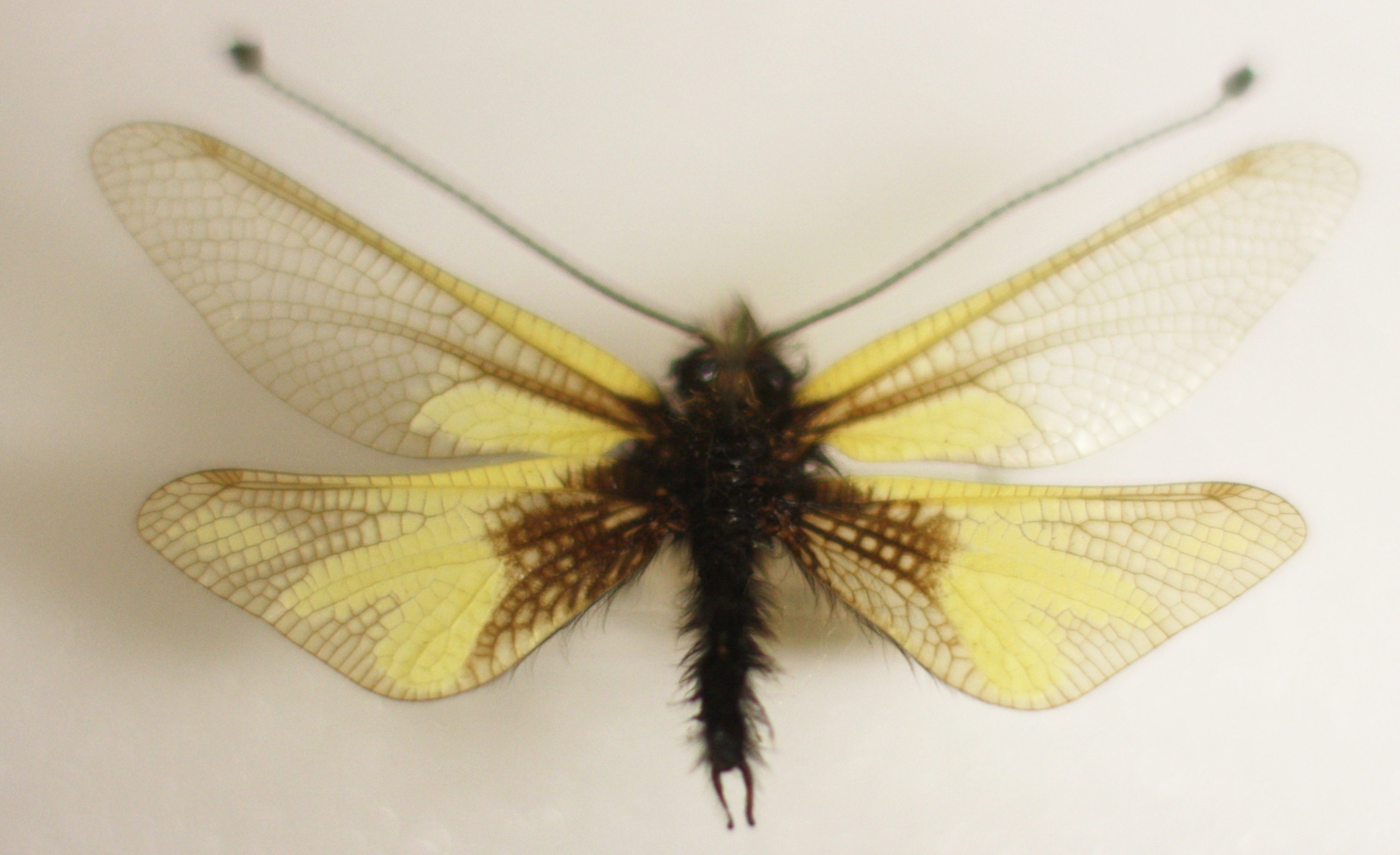
Museum specimen
