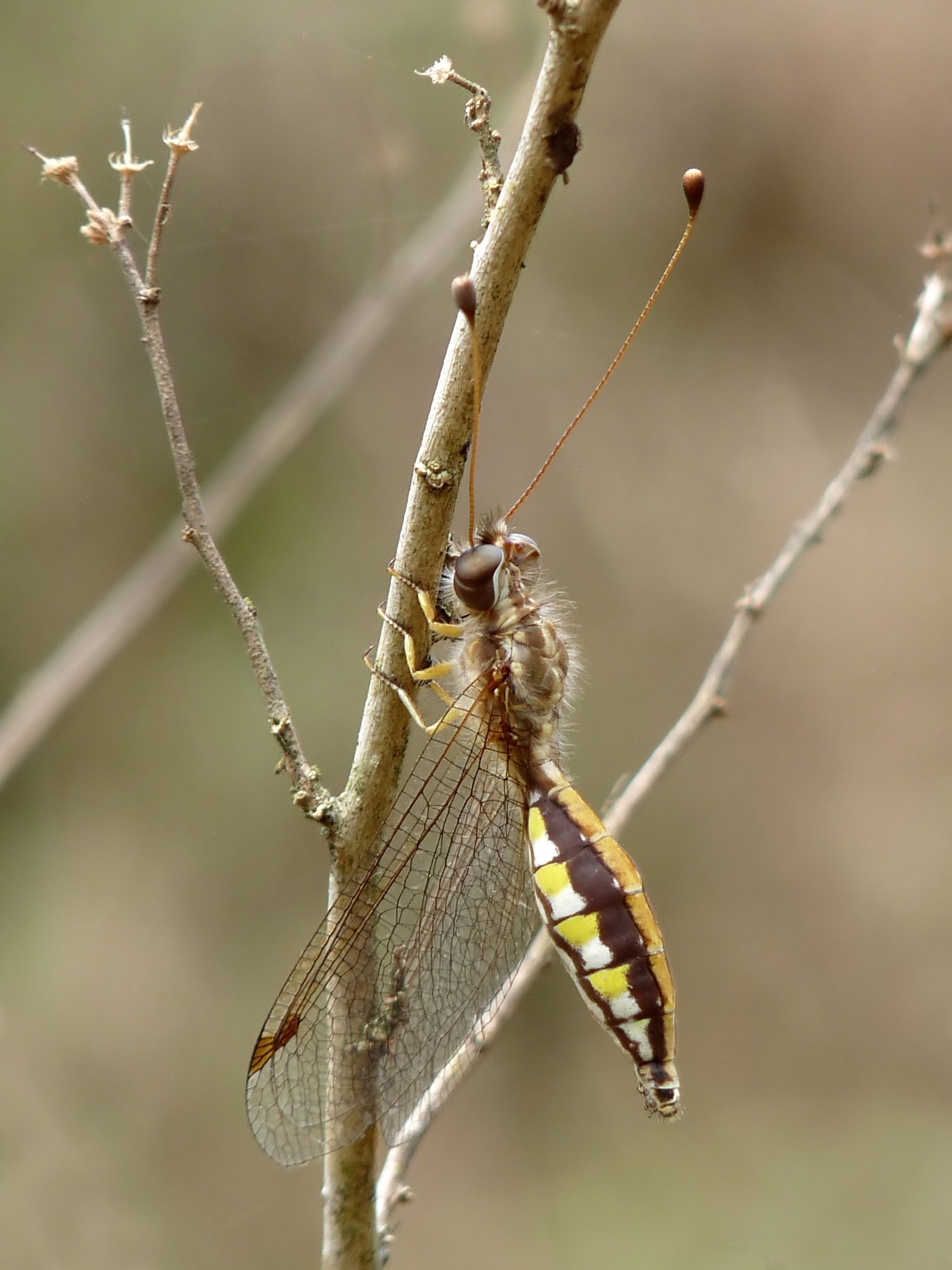
- Ascalaphus sinister photographed in Kadavoor

Scientific classification
- Domain: Eukaryota
- Kingdom: Animalia
- Phylum: Arthropoda
- Class: Insecta
- Order: Neuroptera
- Family: Ascalaphidae
- Subfamily: Ascalaphinae
- Genus: Ascalaphus; Fabricius, 1775

Species
- See text

= Ascalaphus (insect) =

Genus of owlfly

Ascalaphus is a genus of owlfly belonging to the tribe Ascalaphini. The species of this genus are found in Africa and Asia.

== Species ==
There are around 23 valid species in this genus:

- Ascalaphus abdominalis (Kimmins, 1949)
- Ascalaphus aethiopicus (Kimmins, 1949)
- Ascalaphus africanus (McLachlan, 1871)
- Ascalaphus barbarus (Linnaeus, 1767)
- Ascalaphus bilineatus (Kolbe, 1897)
- Ascalaphus clavicornis Lichtenstein, 1796
- Ascalaphus dicax Walker, 1853
- Ascalaphus festivus (Rambur, 1842)
- Ascalaphus libelluloides van der Weele, 1909
- Ascalaphus lloydi (Kimmins, 1949)
- Ascalaphus longistigma (McLachlan, 1871)
- Ascalaphus minutus Tjeder, 1986
- Ascalaphus pallidulus Prost, 2013
- Ascalaphus placidus (Gerstaecker, 1894)
- Ascalaphus procax Walker, 1853
- Ascalaphus prothoracicus (Kimmins, 1949)
- Ascalaphus quadrimaculatus Lichtenstein, 1796
- Ascalaphus rougoni Prost, 2013
- Ascalaphus rusticus Lichtenstein, 1796
- Ascalaphus sinister Walker, 1853
- Ascalaphus tessellatus Lichtenstein, 1796
- Ascalaphus vitreipennis Gistel, 1856
- Ascalaphus worthingtoni (Kimmins, 1949)
