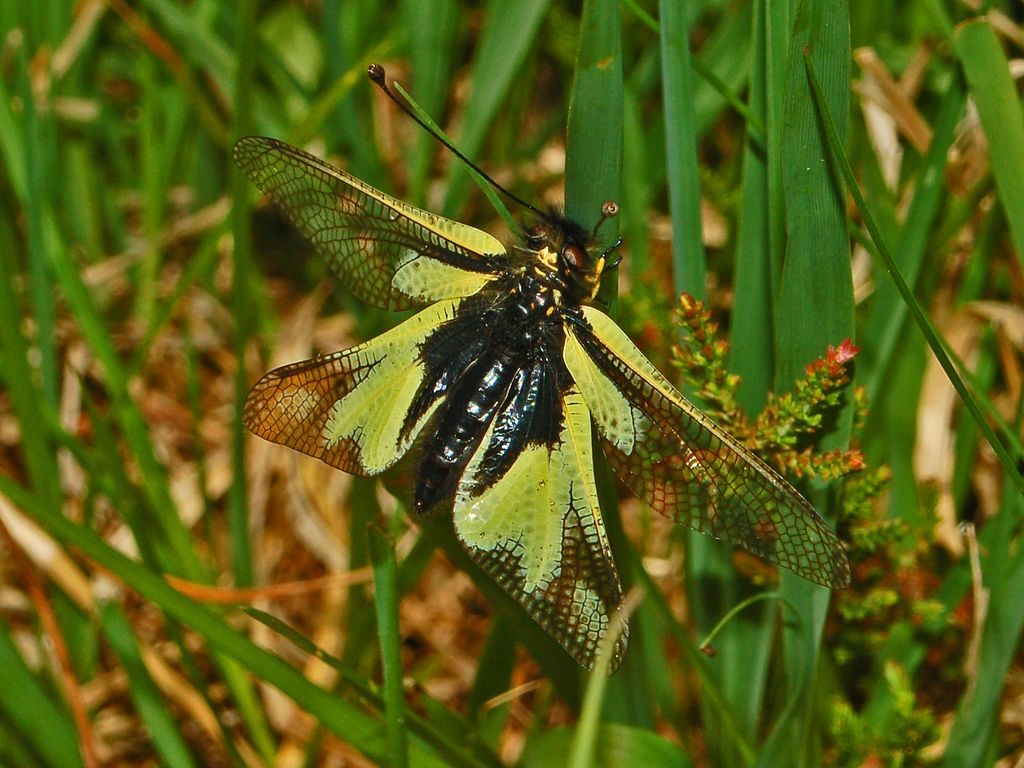
- Libelloides coccajus, female

Scientific classification
- Domain: Eukaryota
- Kingdom: Animalia
- Phylum: Arthropoda
- Class: Insecta
- Order: Neuroptera
- Family: Ascalaphidae
- Tribe: Ascalaphini
- Genus: Libelloides; Schaeffer, 1766

Species
- See text

= Libelloides =

Genus of lacewings

Libelloides is a genus of owlflies belonging to the subfamily Ascalaphinae. The species of this genus are present in most of Europe. They inhabit dry meadows or dry coniferous forests.

== Species ==
- Libelloides baeticus (Rambur, 1842)
- Libelloides coccajus (Denis & Schiffermüller, 1775)
- Libelloides cunii Selys-Longchamps, 1880
- Libelloides hispanicus (Rambur, 1842)
- Libelloides ictericus (Charpentier, 1825)
- Libelloides lacteus (Brullé, 1832)
- Libelloides longicornis (Linnaeus, 1764)
- Libelloides macaronius (Scopoli, 1763)
- Libelloides rhomboides (Schneider, 1845)
- Libelloides sibiricus (Eversmann, 1850)
