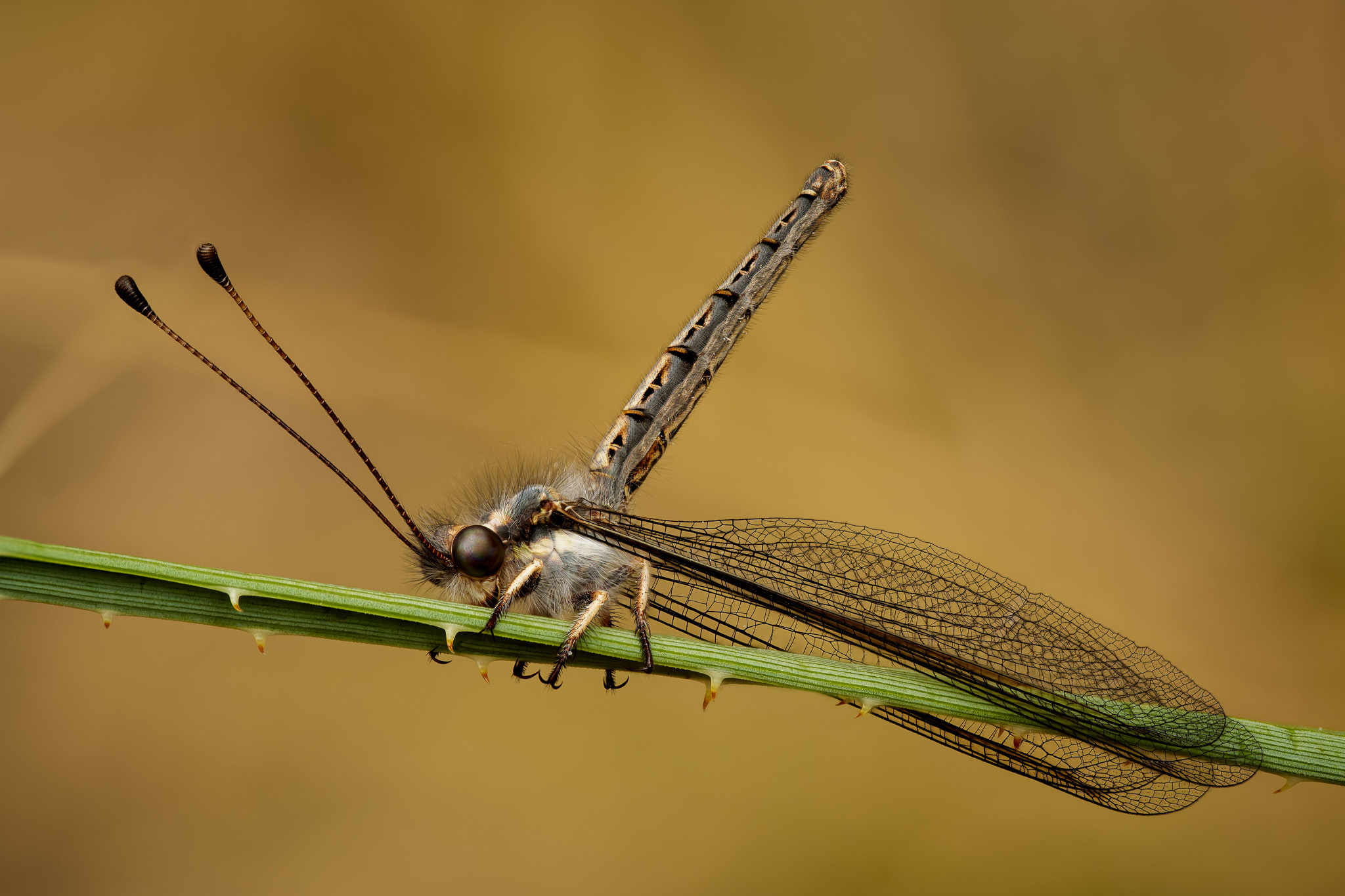
- Ascaloptynx appendiculata in the United States

Scientific classification
- Kingdom: Animalia
- Phylum: Arthropoda
- Class: Insecta
- Order: Neuroptera
- Family: Ascalaphidae
- Tribe: Haplogleniini
- Genus: Ascaloptynx; Banks, 1915

= Ascaloptynx =

Genus of insects

Ascaloptynx is a genus of owlflies in the family Ascalaphidae. There are at least two described species in Ascaloptynx.

== Species ==
These two species belong to the genus Ascaloptynx:

- Ascaloptynx appendiculata (Fabricius, 1793)
- Ascaloptynx oligocenica Nel, 1991
