= Cordulecerus elegans =

Scientific classification
- Domain: Eukaryota
- Kingdom: Animalia
- Phylum: Arthropoda
- Class: Insecta
- Order: Neuroptera
- Family: Ascalaphidae
- Genus: Cordulecerus
- Species: C. elegans

Binomial name
- Cordulecerus elegans van der Weele, 1909

Species of insect

Cordulecerus elegans is a species of owlflies, neuropteran insects in the family Ascalaphidae. It is found in South America.
