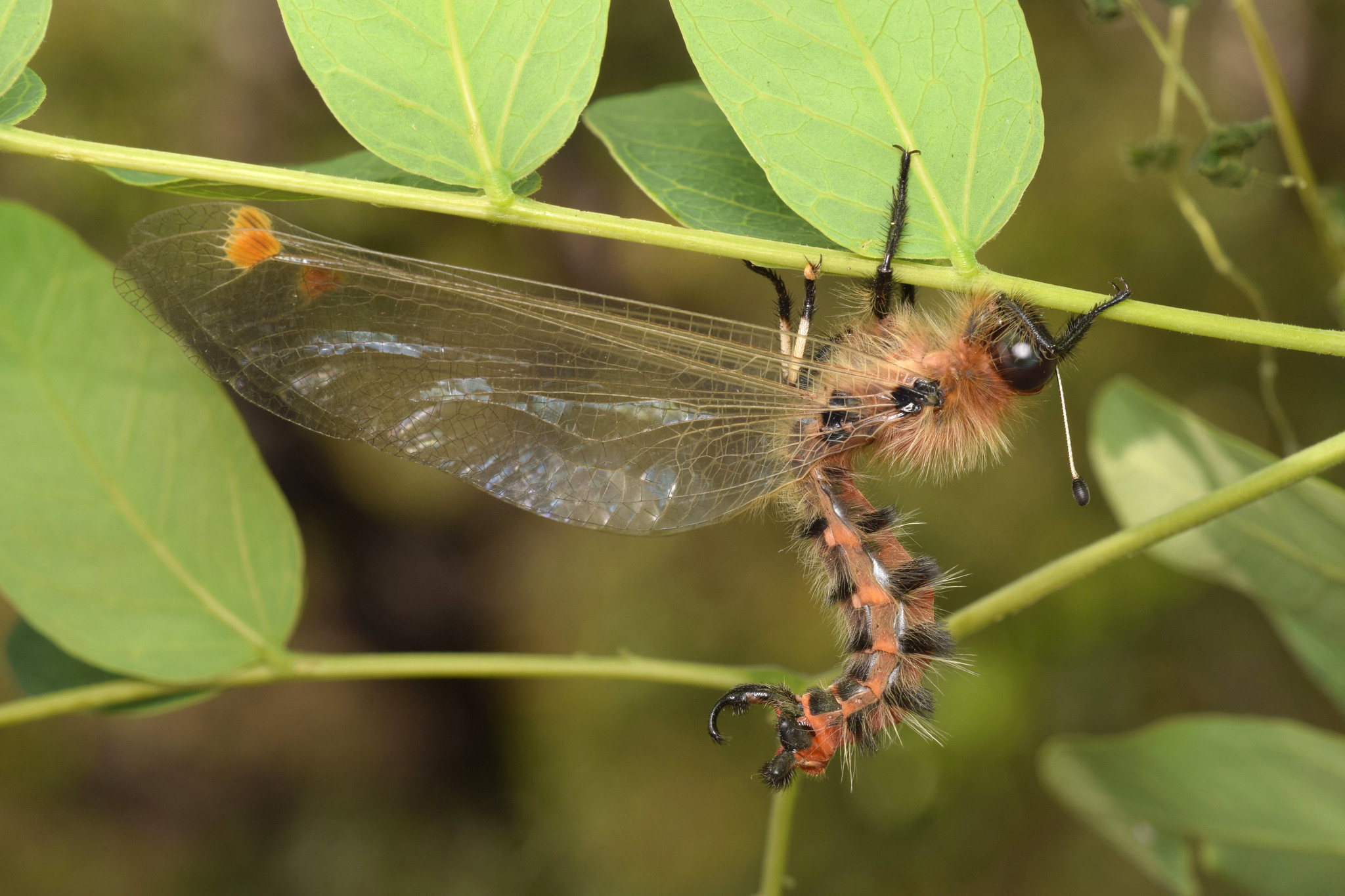
- Top-down photo of Albardia furcata

Scientific classification
- Kingdom: Animalia
- Phylum: Arthropoda
- Clade: Pancrustacea
- Class: Insecta
- Order: Neuroptera
- Family: Ascalaphidae
- Genus: Albardia
- Species: A. furcata

Binomial name
- Albardia furcata Weele, 1903

= Albardia furcata =

Species of insect

Albardia furcata is a species of owlfly from the genus Albardia. The adult presents with a rusty reddish-brown color and a wool-textured abdomen. It is endemic to the tropical biomes of Brazil.

== Phylogeny ==
When initially described, the genus was inserted in the family Ascalaphidae (Weele, 1903), and few years later, it was placed by the same author (Weele) in the monotypic tribe Albardiini. Some publications previously identified Albardia furcata as a member of the composite family Stilbopterygidae before settling on its placement in Ascalaphidae.

== Characteristics ==
Individuals of Albardia furcata are identified by short antennae that are thick at the base and long unangled wings. The head and thorax have a reddish-brown color, and the legs are covered in long bristle-like structures called setae. The bristles are dark yellow in color on the back side of the legs closer to the body, and are black on the front (anterior) side. The outmost layer of the abdomen in adults is composed of a woolly texture, noticeably different from other species in Ascalaphidae. It shares physical similarities with insects in the order Odonata, causing confusion in some identifications. The head is compressed from the back (dorsoventrally flattened) in recorded individuals, and it is wider than it is long.

== Distribution ==
Albardia furcata is endemic to Brazil, with species recorded from Cerrado, Caatinga, and Atlantic Forest biomes. These biomes were located within the eastern and northern regions of the country, and it is likely they have spread across other areas of Brazil.
