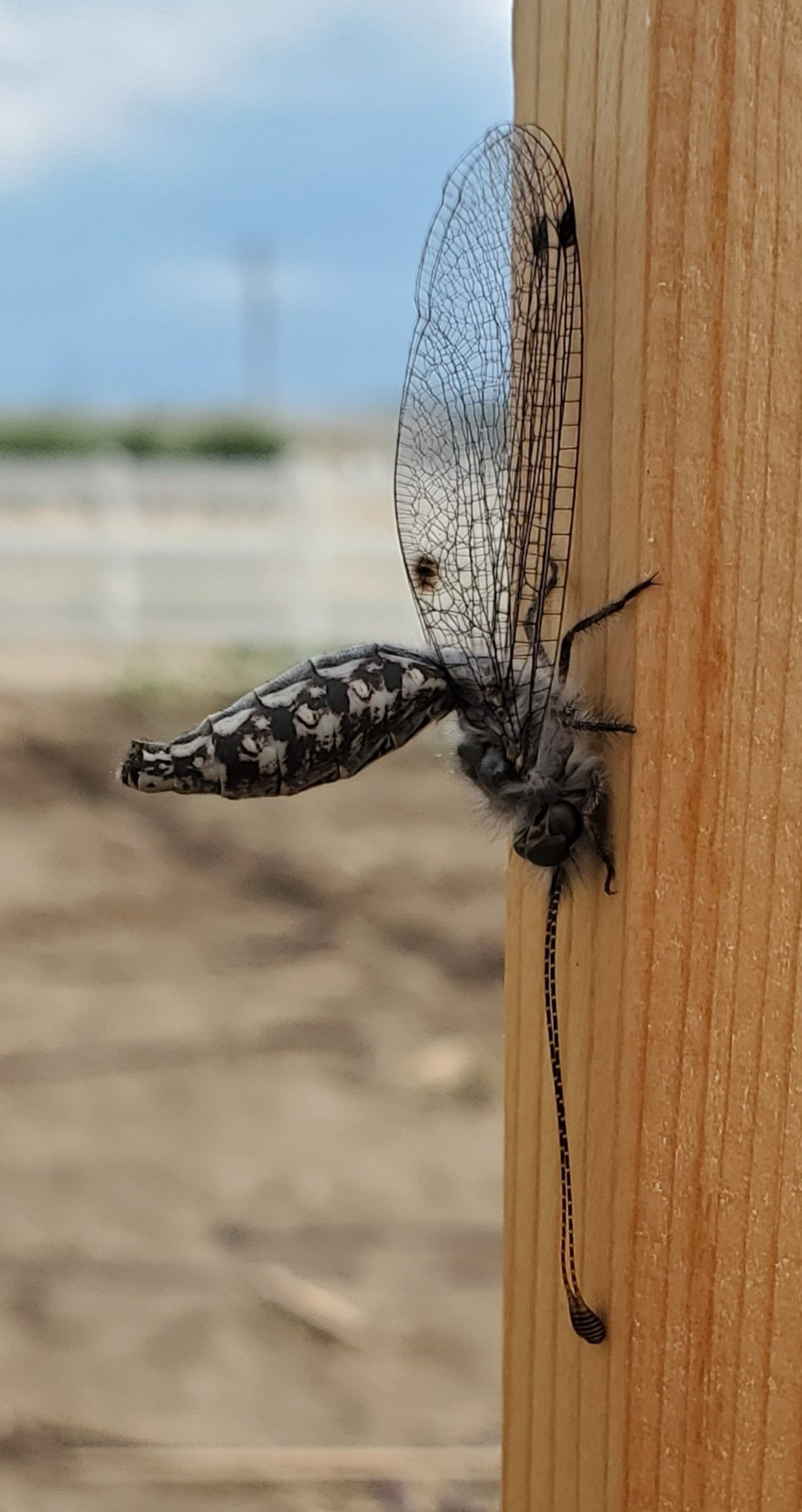
- Ululodes mexicanus in hunting posture

Scientific classification
- Kingdom: Animalia
- Phylum: Arthropoda
- Class: Insecta
- Order: Neuroptera
- Family: Ascalaphidae
- Subfamily: Ululodinae
- Genus: Ululodes; Currie, 1900

Species
- 26 species (see text)

= Ululodes =

Genus of insects

Ululodes is a genus of owlflies in the tribe Ululodini. There are at least 27 described species in Ululodes.

== Characteristics ==
Ululodes is characterized by wings that are yellow to red in color, and very dark and visible veins. They have two antennae that are around 21 millimetres (0.83 in) in length. The rest of the body is yellow in color as well, although some variations have observed a dark brown color.

== Species ==
As of 2024 the genus contains:

- Ululodes apollinaris Navás, 1927
- Ululodes arizonensis Banks, 1907
- Ululodes banksi van der Weele, 1909
- Ululodes bicolor (Banks, 1895)
- Ululodes brachycerus Navás, 1918
- Ululodes cajennensis (Fabricius, 1787)
  - U. c. cajennensis (Fabricius, 1787)
  - U. c. nanus Navás, 1911
- Ululodes chiricahuensis Jones and Jensen, 2024
- Ululodes costanus Navás, 1914
- Ululodes flavistigma Banks, 1908
- Ululodes floridanus (Banks, 1906)
- Ululodes heterocerus Navás, 1915
- Ululodes macleayanus (Guilding, 1823)
  - U. m. macleayanus (Guilding, 1823)
  - U. m. sanctaeluciae van der Weele, 1909
- Ululodes mexicanus (McLachlan, 1871)
- Ululodes nigripes Banks, 1943
- Ululodes oppositus Banks, 1938
- †Ululodes paleonesius Engel & Grimaldi, 2007 (extinct)
- Ululodes pilosus van der Weele, 1909
- Ululodes quadripunctatus (Burmeister, 1839)
- Ululodes roseni Navás, 1911
- Ululodes sanctidomingi van der Weele, 1909
- Ululodes sinuatus Banks, 1924
- Ululodes smithi Banks, 1938
- Ululodes subvertens (Walker, 1853)
- Ululodes tuberculatus (Banks, 1901)
- Ululodes vetulus (Rambur, 1842)
- Ululodes villosus (Palisot de Beauvois, 1807)
- Ululodes walkeri van der Weele, 1909
