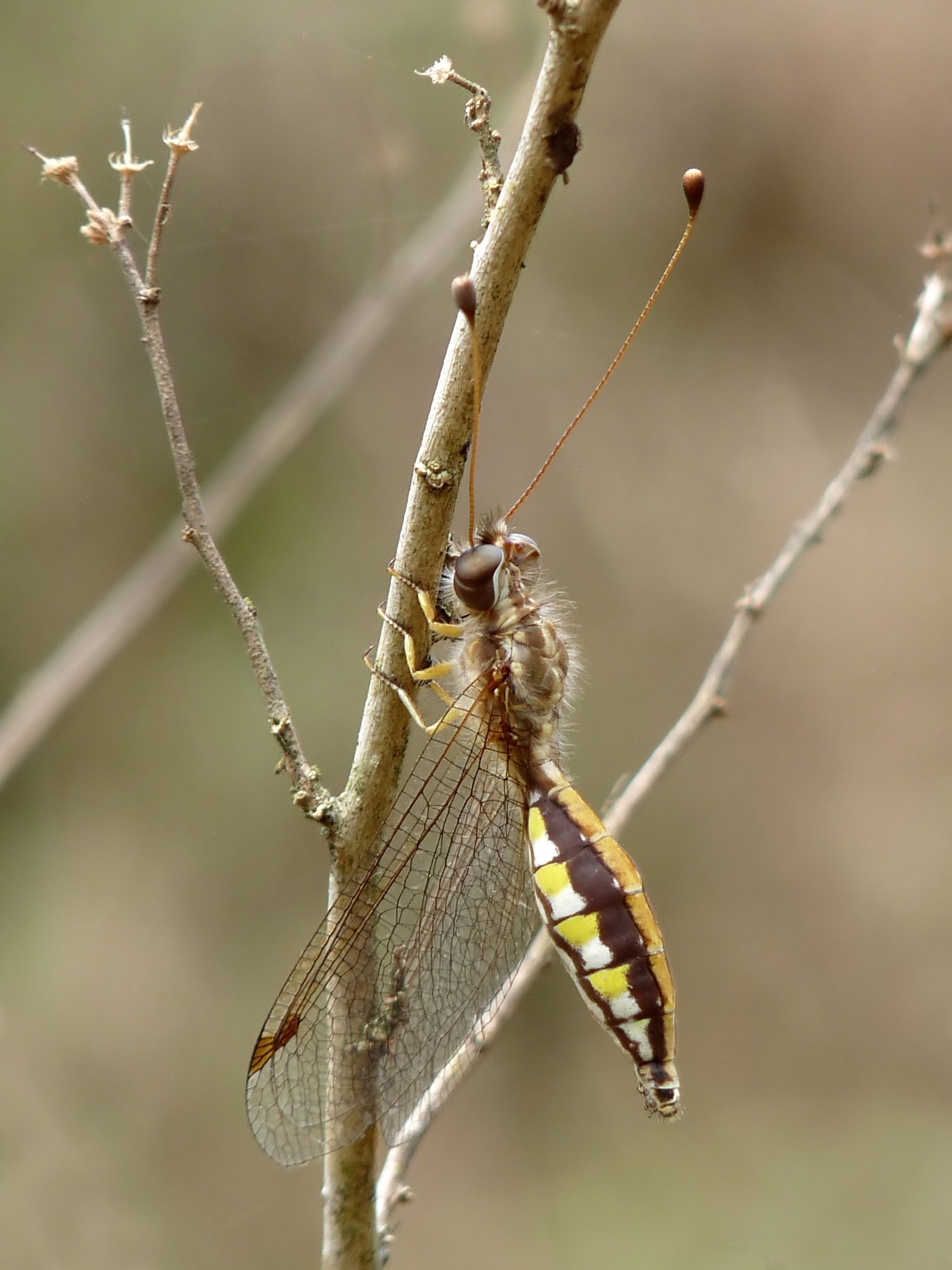
- A. sinister photographed in Kadavoor

Scientific classification
- Domain: Eukaryota
- Kingdom: Animalia
- Phylum: Arthropoda
- Class: Insecta
- Order: Neuroptera
- Family: Ascalaphidae
- Genus: Ascalaphus
- Species: A. sinister

Binomial name
- Ascalaphus sinister Walker, 1853

Synonyms
- Helicomitus sinister (Walker, 1853); Ogcogaster sinister (Walker, 1853)

= Ascalaphus sinister =

Species of owlfly

Ascalaphus sinister is a species of owlfly from northern India. The thorax is covered in brown hairs, with yellow markings on the sides and ventral surface and a yellow stripe running down the dorsum. The head is yellow and covered in white hairs, with some black hair on the vertex. The antennae are rust red and not as long as the wings. The elongate abdomen is saffron yellow with two black stripes down the back and a number of black streaks along the sides. Legs are yellow. The vagina in females is short and wide. The bursa copulatrix and receptaculum seminis are relatively proximate, with the latter being sclerotized and wrinkled.
