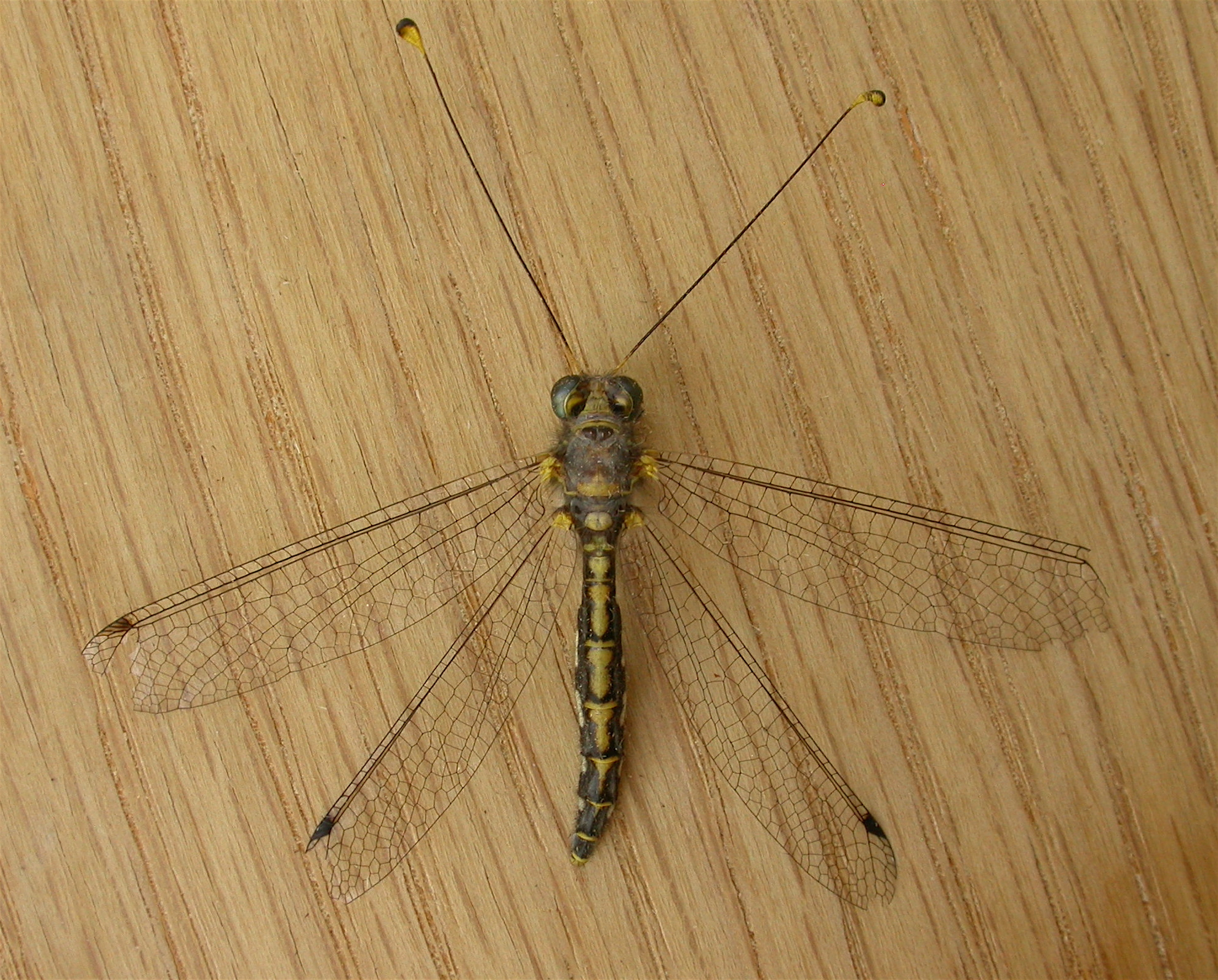
- Suhpalacsa subtrahens

Scientific classification
- Kingdom: Animalia
- Phylum: Arthropoda
- Clade: Pancrustacea
- Class: Insecta
- Order: Neuroptera
- Family: Ascalaphidae
- Subfamily: Ascalaphinae

Genera
- 70 species (see text)

= Ascalaphinae =

Tribe of insects

Ascalaphinae is the type subfamily of the neuropteran owlfly family. Most species are found in the tropics. Their characteristic apomorphy, shared with the Ululodinae, is the ridge which divides each of their large compound eyes; both groups are thus sometimes known as split-eyed owlflies.

Like the other owlflies, they are insectivores. Imagines are cumbersome fliers and lack the strong mouthparts of dragonflies (which owlflies resemble at first glance, despite being not at all closely related insects) or other decidedly predatory insects, they are restricted to small and defenseless prey. The larvae on the other hand resemble antlions in appearance and habits and are voracious ambush predators, able to tackle prey like ants that will not be eaten without a struggle.

The ascalaphine split-eyed owlflies form one of the two main lineages of living Ascalaphidae, the other being the Haplogleniinae which have unsplit eyes like their ancestors. The first fossil record of the Ascalaphinae dates to the Miocene, and the subfamily thus probably evolved in the latter half or towards the end of the Paleogene.

== Genera ==
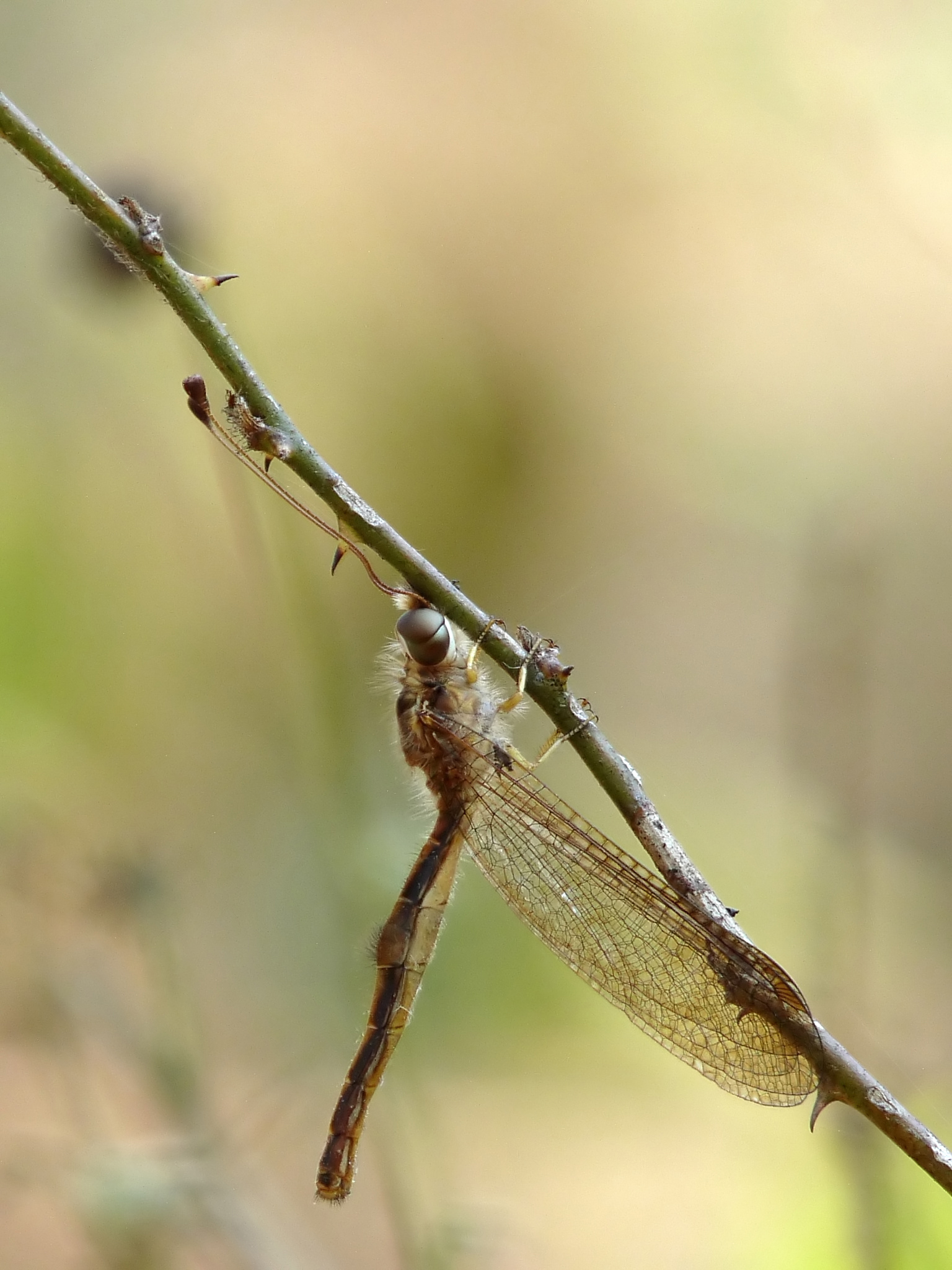
Ascalaphus sinister male

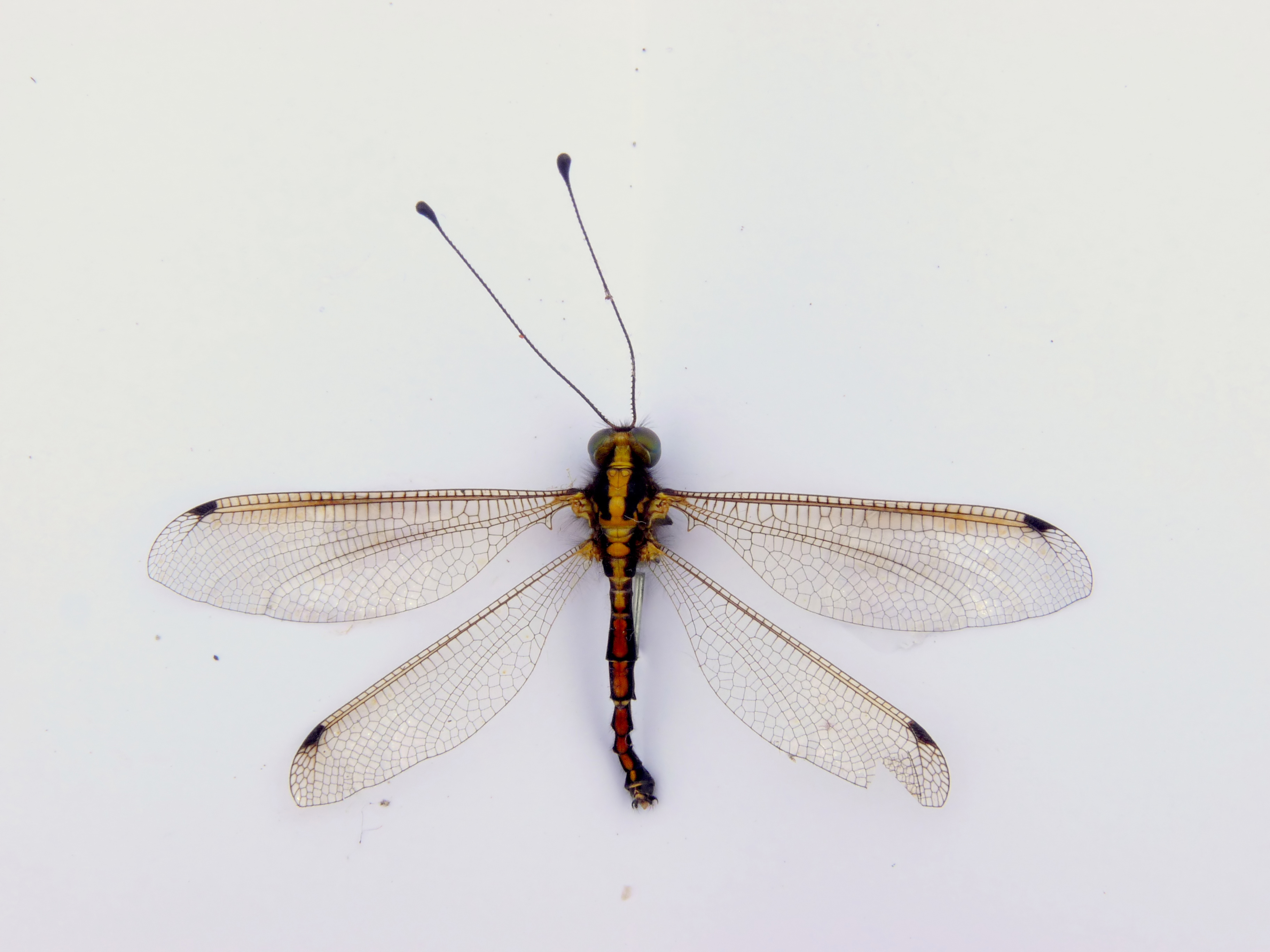
Glyptobasis sp. male

- Abascalaphus Tjeder & Hansson, 1992
- Acheron (insect) Lefèbvre 1842
- Acmonotus McLachlan, 1871
- Agadirius Badano & Pantaleoni, 2012
- Agrionosoma van der Weele, 1909
- Angolania Koçak & Kemal, 2008
- Angustacsa New, 1984
- Ascalaphodes McLachlan, 1871
- Ascalaphus Fabricius, 1775
- Ascalohybris Sziráki, 1998
- Ascapseudoptynx Abrahám & Mészáros, 2006
- Aspoeckiella Hölzel 2004
- Botjederinus Abrahám, 2011
- Brevibarbis Tjeder & Hansson, 1992
- Bubomyiella Tjeder & Hansson, 1992
- Bubopsis McLachlan 1898
- Cirrops Tjeder 1980
- Deleproctophylla Lefèbvrem 1842
- Dentalacsa New, 1984
- Dicolpus Gerstaecker, 1885
- Disparomitus van der Weele, 1909
- Dixonotus Kimmins, 1950
- Dorsomitus Michel & Tjeder, 2018
- Encyoposis McLachlan 1871
- Encyopsidius Navás 1912
- Eremoides Tjeder 1992
- Farakosius Michel 1998
- Fillus Navás 1919
- Forcepacsa New 1984
- Glyptobasis McLachlan 1871
- Helcopteryx McLachlan 1871
- Horischema Mészáros & Abrahám, 2003
- Kimulodes Tjeder & Hansson 1992
- Libelloides Schäffer 1763
- Lobalacsa New 1984
- Mabiza Tjeder & Hansson 1992
- Maezous Ábrahám 2008
- Mansellacsa Hölzel 2004
- Megacmonotus New 1984
- Nagacta Navás 1914
- Nanomitus Navás 1912
- Nephelasca Navás 1914
- Nephoneura McLachlan 1871
- Nousera Navás 1923
- Ogcogaster Westwood 1847
- Parascalaphus Martynova 1926
- Parasuphalomitus New 1984
- Perissoschema Mészáros & Abrahám 2003
- Phalascusa Kolbe 1897
- Pictacsa New 1984
- Pilacmonotus New 1984
- Proctarrelabis Lefèbvre 1842
- Protacheron Weele 1909
- Protidricerus Weele 1909
- Protobubopsis van der Weele 1909
- Pseudencyoposis van der Weele, 1909
- Pseudodisparomitus New 1984
- Pseudohybris van der Weele 1909
- Pseudoproctarrelabris van der Weele 1909
- Puer (insect) Lefèbvre 1842
- Siphlocerus McLachlan 1871
- Stephanolasca van der Weele 1909
- Strixomyia Tjeder 1989
- Stylascalaphus Sziráki 1998
- Suhpalacsa Lefèbvre, 1842
- Suphalomitus van der Weele 1909
- Tytomyia Tjeder & Hansson 1992
- Ululomyia Tjeder 1992
- Umbracsa New 1984
- Venacsa New 1984
