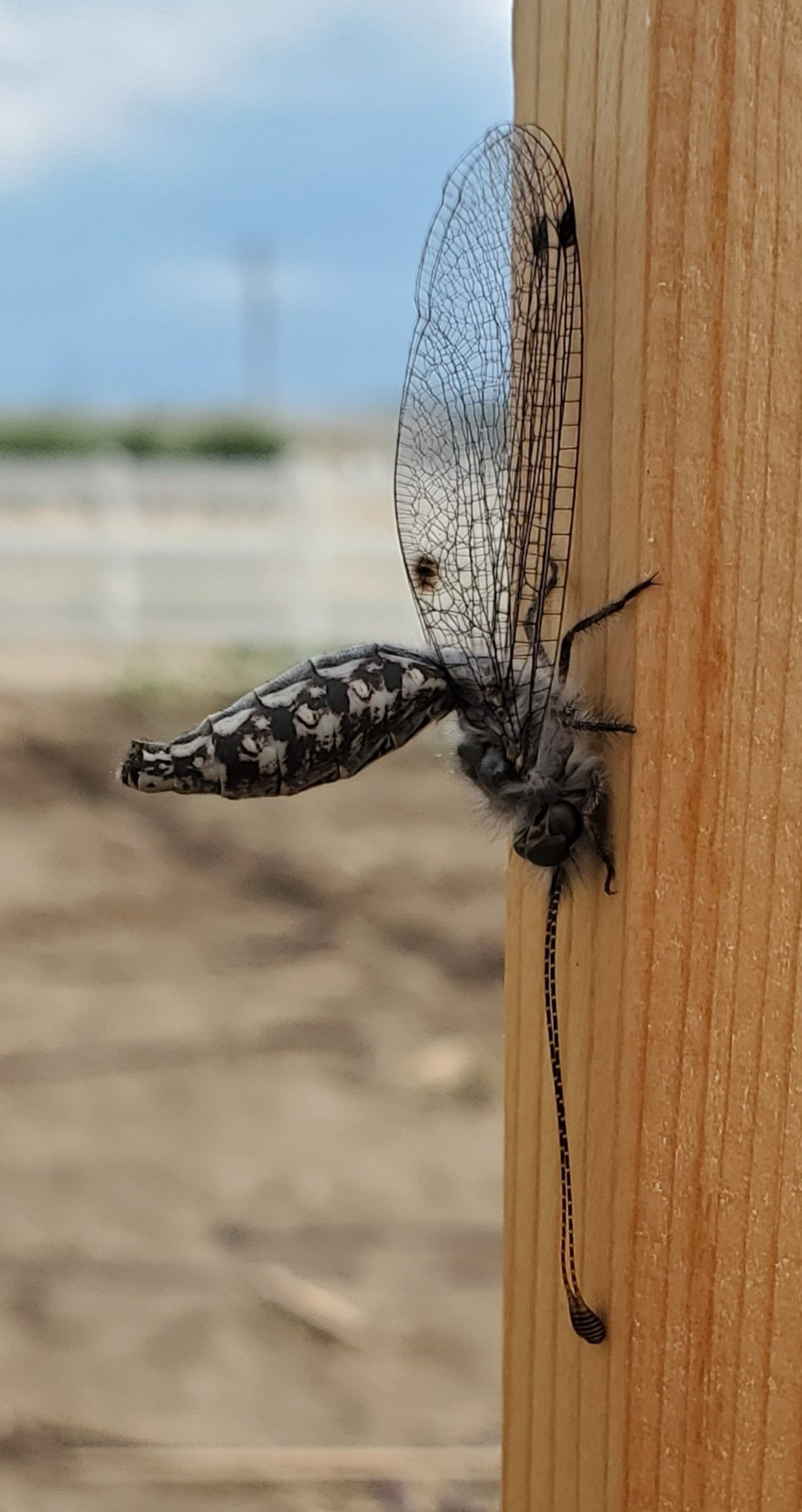
- Ululodes mexicanus in hunting posture

Scientific classification
- Domain: Eukaryota
- Kingdom: Animalia
- Phylum: Arthropoda
- Class: Insecta
- Order: Neuroptera
- Family: Ascalaphidae
- Subfamily: Ululodinae van der Weele, 1908

Genera
- Ameropterus; Ascalorphne; Cordulecerus; Ululodes

= Ululodinae =

Subfamily of insects

Ululodinae is a subfamily or tribe (as Ululodini) of owlflies. Both they and the Ascalaphinae are sometimes known as split-eyed owlflies due to the characteristic ridge that bisects their compound eyes.
