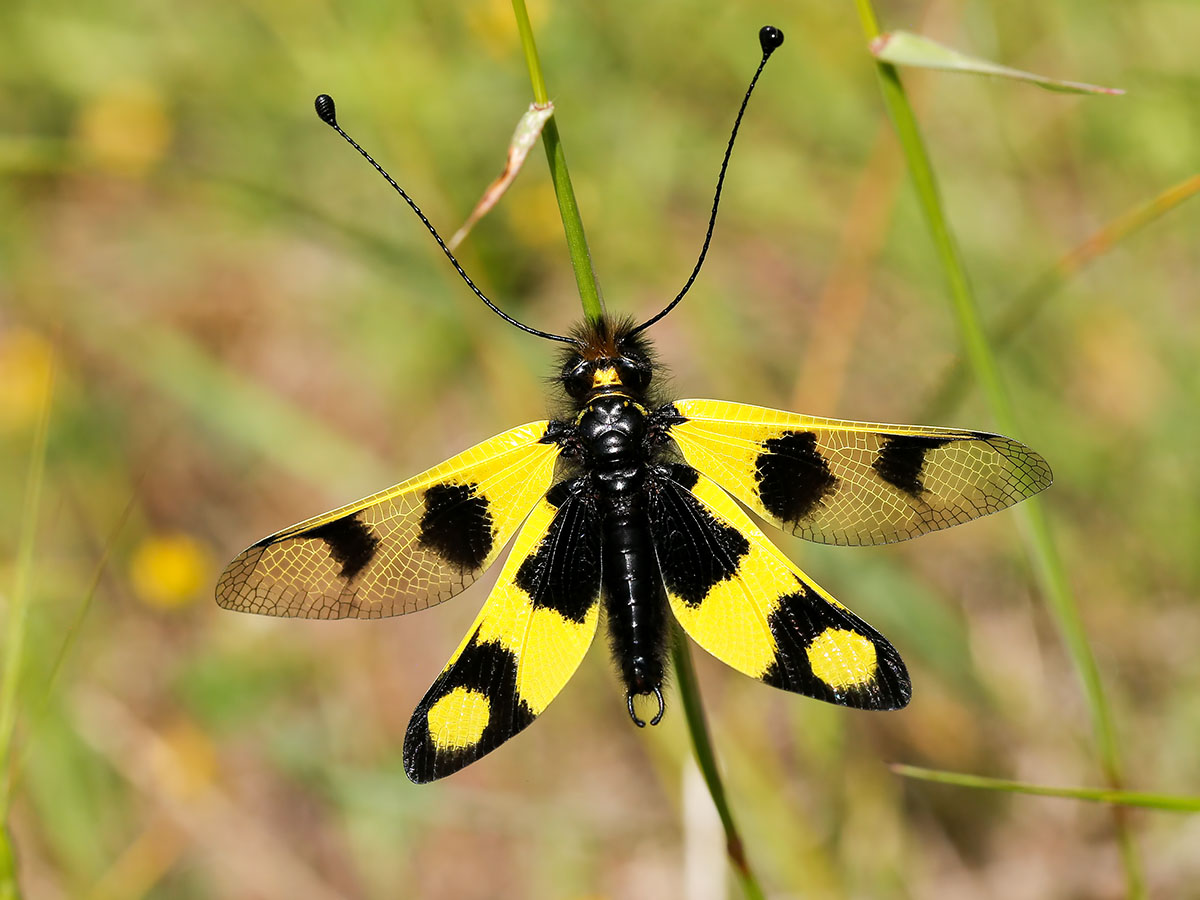
- Libelloides macaronius
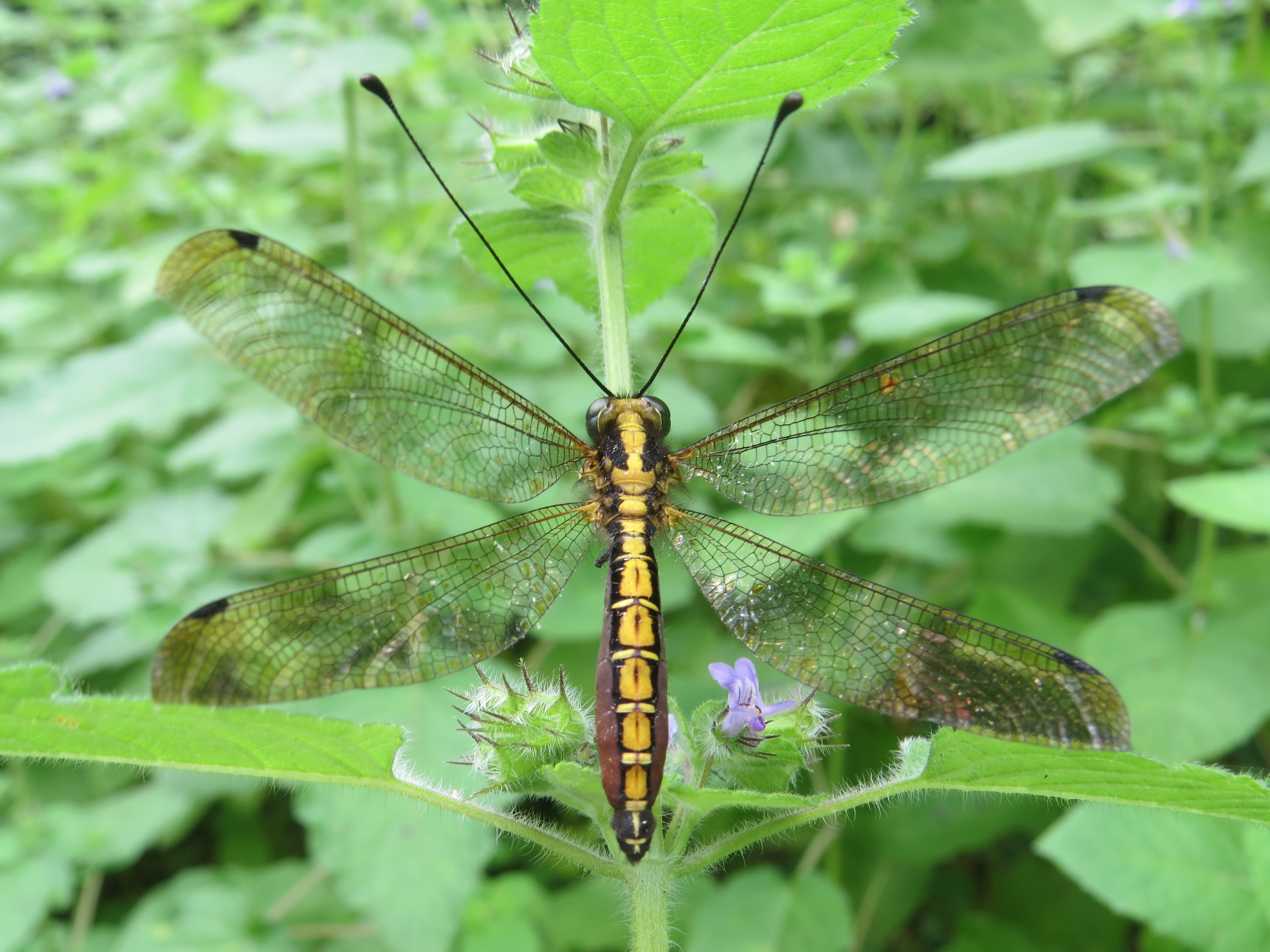
- Ascalohybris subjacens

Scientific classification
- Kingdom: Animalia
- Phylum: Arthropoda
- Clade: Pancrustacea
- Class: Insecta
- Order: Neuroptera
- Clade: Myrmeleontiformia
- Family: Ascalaphidae; Rambur, 1842

Subfamilies
- Albardiinae; Ascalaphinae; Haplogleniinae; Melambrotinae; Ululodinae; and see text

= Owlfly =

Owlfly Temporal range: Eocene–Recent

Family of insects

Ascalaphidae is a family of insects in the order Neuroptera, commonly called owlflies; there are some 450 extant species. They are fast-flying crepuscular or diurnal predators of other flying insects, and have large bulging eyes and strongly knobbed antennae. The larvae are ambush predators; some of them make use of self-decoration camouflage.

== Description ==
Owlflies are readily distinguished from the superficially similar dragonflies by their long, clubbed antennae; dragonflies have short, bristle-like antennae. The closely related antlions (family Myrmeleontidae) have short, weakly clubbed antennae, smaller eyes, and reticulate wing venation. All but one species of Ascalaphidae have long antennae, easily distinguishing them. The sole exception is the Brazilian Albardia furcata, the only living member of the subfamily Albardiinae, which has short antennae, but these are strongly clubbed (compared to myrmeleontids), and its wing venation is reticulate, typical of ascalaphids. Most owlflies are about 1.5 inches (3.8 cm) in length, not including antennae. Adult owlflies of the family Ululodinae such as Ululodes have large divided eyes and crepuscular habits, which is where the common name "owlfly" came from. Owlflies are worldwide in distribution, occurring in warm temperate and tropical habitats; there are some 450 extant species.

== Ecology ==
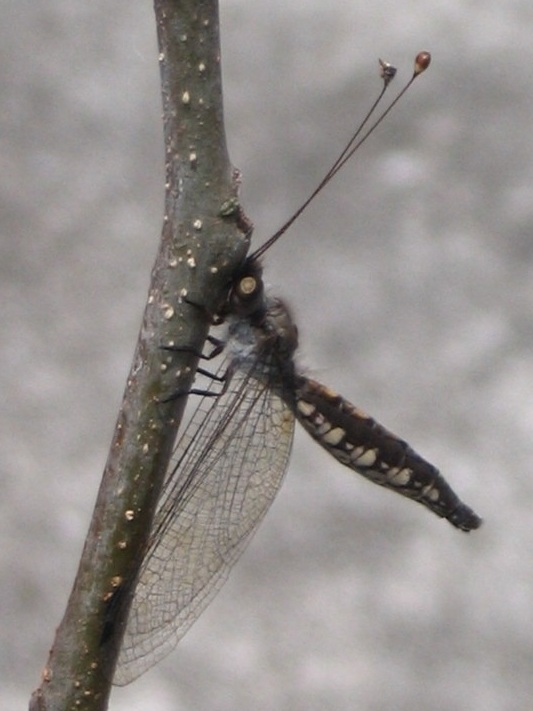
Some owlflies raise the abdomen at rest, mimicking a broken twig.

Adult owlflies are fast-flying, aerial predators, capturing and feeding on other insects in flight. The larvae too are predatory, making owlflies important in maintaining a natural ecological balance and helping to control pest insects.

Adults of many New World species are most active at sunset, and can often be collected near lights. During the day, adults rest on stems and twigs with the body, legs, and antennae typically pressed to the stem. Some Old World species, such as Libelloides macaronius, are active during the day.

=== Anti-predator defences ===
When disturbed, some owlflies release a strong, musk-like chemical to deter enemies. The abdomen in Ululodes quadrimaculatus is raised at rest, mimicking a broken twig.

Some New World species such as Haploglenius luteus are able to suddenly reflex a flap on the pronotum, exposing a strongly-contrasting patch of pale colour (white or cream), either as a deimatic display to startle predators, or as heliographic signalling, reflecting sunlight, to attract females.

== Life cycle ==
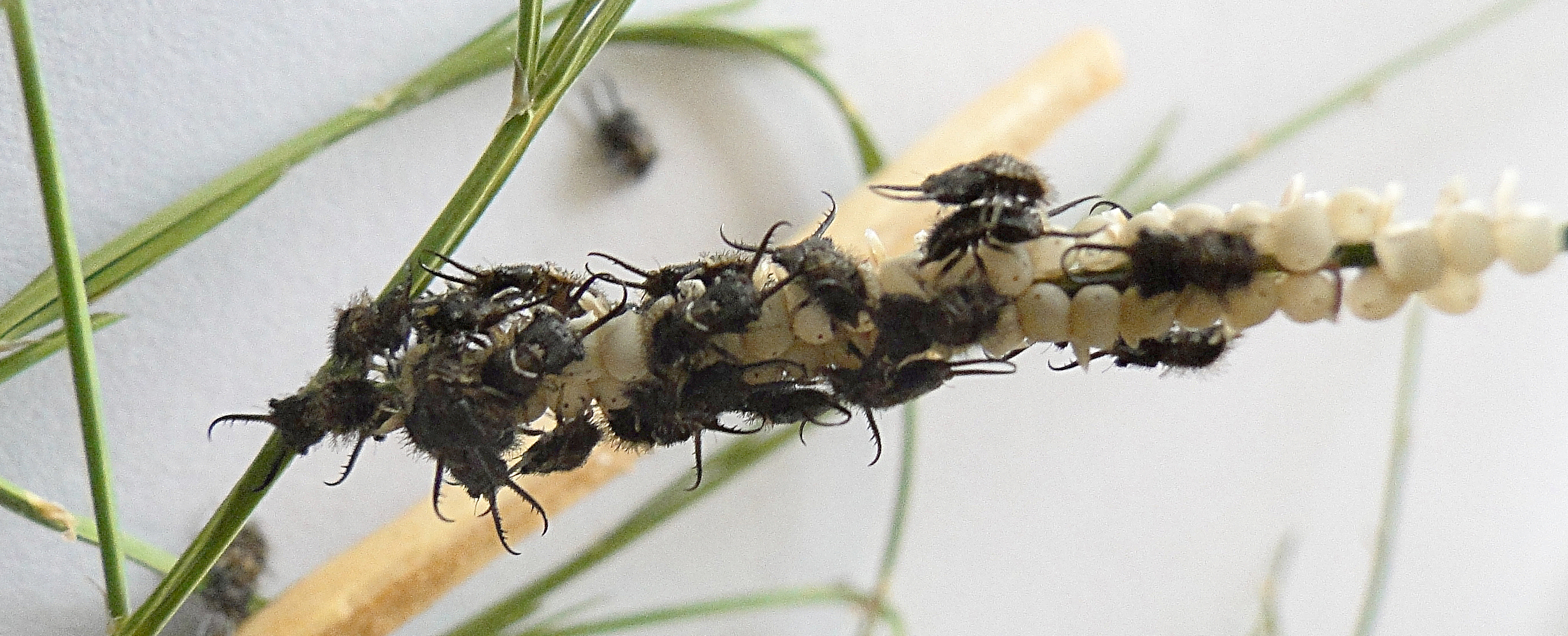
Brood of first instar larvae on their egg-cases before dispersing

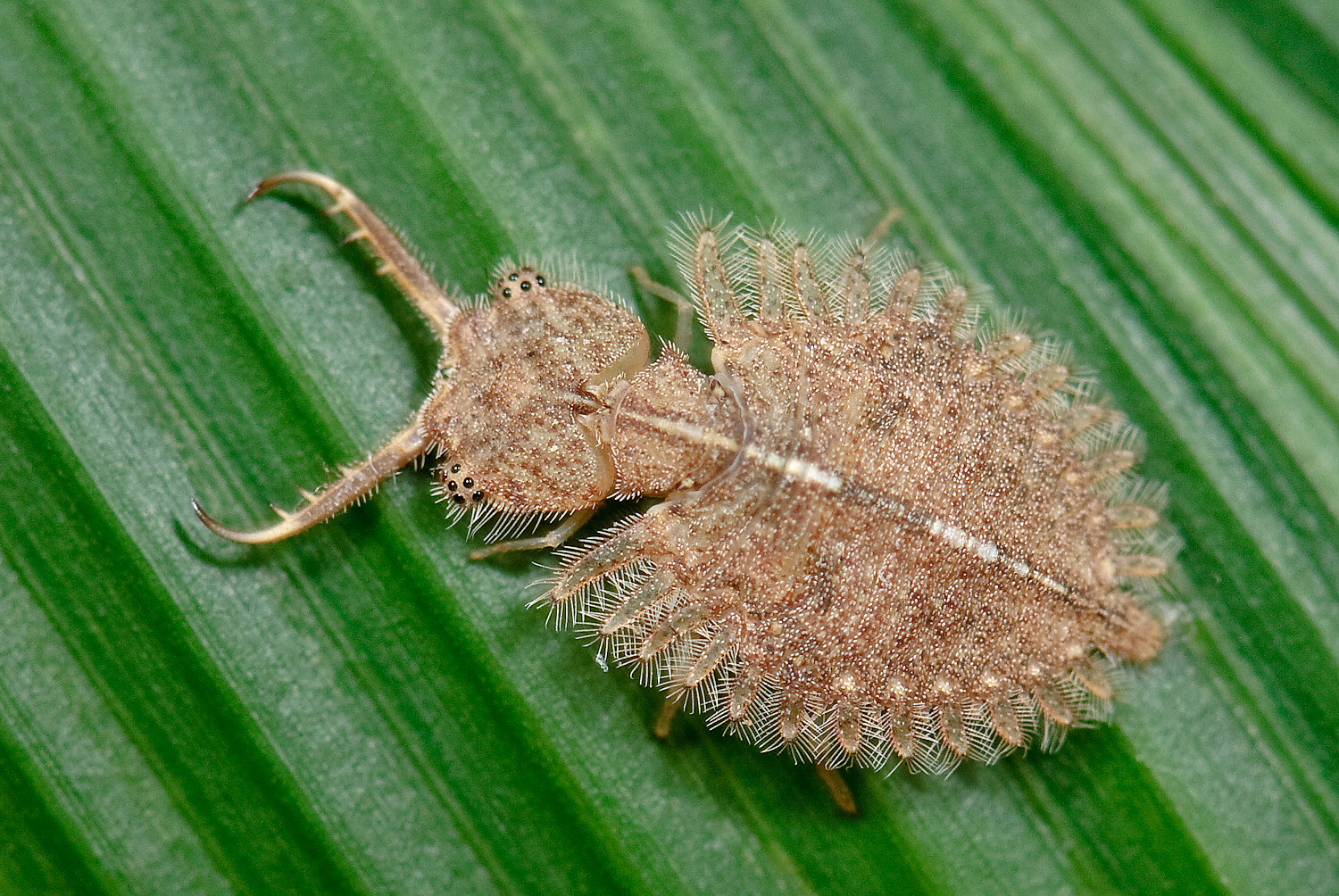
Larva

Eggs are laid on twigs or plant stems. Owlfly larvae are ambush predators, and sequester themselves at the soil surface, in ground litter, or on vegetation, sometimes covered with debris, and wait for prey, which they seize with their large, toothed mandibles. They resemble antlion larvae, but have an elongate, sometimes finger-like appendage on the side of each segment called a scolus-like process. In some genera, larvae actively place sand and debris onto their dorsum as self-decoration camouflage. Pupation occurs in a spheroidal silk cocoon in leaf litter or soil.

== Evolution ==
Owlflies appear to have evolved from a common ancestor with Stilbopterygidae. These, in turn, evolved from a common ancestor with Palparidae, which evolved from a common ancestor with the true antlions, or Myrmeleontidae.

=== Taxonomy and etymology ===
The family Ascalaphidae was first described by the French entomologist Jules Pierre Rambur in 1842. The name is from Greek askalaphos, a kind of owl. In Greek mythology, Ascalaphos was the custodian of the orchard of Hades, god of the underworld; the goddess Demeter transformed him into an owl.

=== Fossil history ===
The owlflies are known from fossils of adults and larvae, often encased in Baltic amber. Most of these cannot be placed in a particular subfamily. Most are known from the Oligocene. The Late Jurassic Mesascalaphus was thought to be a more basal member of the family, but it is now believed to be a member of Mesochrysopidae.

=== Phylogeny ===
Total evidence analysis (several genes + morphology) in 2019 recovered Ascalaphidae as monophyletic and found evidence for five subfamilies: Albardiinae van der Weele, 1909; Ululodinae van der Weele, 1909; Haplogleniinae Newman, 1853; Melambrotinae Tjeder, 1992; and Ascalaphinae Lefèbvre, 1842. This refuted nuclear phylogenomic analysis in 2018, which recovered Ascalaphidae as a paraphyletic lineage within Myrmeleontidae. Molecular analysis in 2018 using mitochondrial rRNA and mitogenomic data also placed the Ascalaphidae as sister to the Myrmeleontidae as the most advanced groups within the Neuroptera. The fossil record has contributed to an understanding of the group's phylogeny. The phylogeny of the owlflies has remained uncertain, with many of the higher taxa apparently not natural groups (clades).

==== External ====
Neuropteran subfamilies are described in Winterton and colleagues 2017 and Jones 2019.

- Neuropterida
  - Raphidioptera
  - - Megaloptera
    - Neuroptera lacewings
      - 6 subfamilies
      - - Ithonidae giant lacewings, moth lacewings
        - Myrmeleontiformia
          - Psychopsidae silky lacewings
          - - Nymphidae split‑footed lacewings
            - - Nemopteridae spoonwings, threadwings
              - Myrmeleontoidea

==== Internal ====
Machado et al 2018 proposes a classification below family level, into tribes (names ending with –ini): Groups formerly considered part of "Myrmeleontidae" are underscored and marked "Myrm."

- Myrmeleontoidea
  - Ascalaphinae
    - Dimarini
    - - Palparini "Myrm."
      - - Ululodini
        - - Stilbopterygini "Myrm."
          - - Haplogleniini
            - Ascalaphini
  - "Myrmeleontidae" (part)
    - Myrmeleontinae
    - - Dendroleontinae
      - Nemoleontinae

Jones 2019 presents a total-evidence phylogeny, preferring to classify only to family level:

- Myrmeleontoidea
  - Myrmeleontidae
  - - Palparidae "Myrm."
    - - Stilbopterygini "Myrm."
      - - Ascalaphidae owlflies
          - Albardiinae
          - - Ululodinae
            - - Melambrotinae
              - - Haplogleniinae
                - Ascalaphinae
