= Greek name =

Personal names of modern Greeks

Greek names are personal names among people of Greek language and culture, generally consisting of a given name and a family name.

== History ==
Ancient Greeks generally had a single name, often qualified with a patronymic, a clan or tribe, or a place of origin. Married women were identified by the name of their husbands, not their fathers.

Hereditary family names or surnames began to be used by elites in the Byzantine period. Well into the 9th century, they were rare. But by the 11th and 12th centuries, elite families often used family names. Family names came from placenames, nicknames, or occupations.

During the Ottoman period, surnames with Turkish prefixes such as "Hatzi-" ("Hacı"), "Kara-" ("brave") and suffixes such as "-(i)lis" ("li/lı" meaning "of"), "-tzis" ("ci/cı/çi/çı" meaning "-maker, -smith"), and "-oglou" ("oğlu" meaning "son of") became common. It is not clear when stable family surnames became widely used. Though elite families often had stable family names, many of the "last names" used by Greeks into the 19th century were either patronymics or nicknames. It is also possible that family names were simply not recorded because Ottoman administrative practice preferred patronymics and did not require surnames.

In the 19th century, patronymic surnames became common.

For personal names, from the first century CE until the nineteenth century CE, pagan names from antiquity were mostly replaced by names from Christian scriptures and tradition. With the Modern Greek Enlightenment and the development of Greek nationalism, names from antiquity became popular again.

Family names may be patronymic in origin or based on occupation, location, or personal characteristic. These origins are often indicated by prefixes or suffixes. Traditionally, a woman used a feminine version of her father's family name, replacing it with a feminine version of her husband's family name on marriage. In modern Greece, a woman keeps her father's family name for life but may use a husband's name.

== Given names ==
Until the late 18th century, almost all Christian Greeks were named for Orthodox saints from the Old and New Testaments and early Christian tradition. Since then, names of both deities and mortals from antiquity have been popular as well.

Male names usually end in -ας, -ης, ούς, and -ος, but sometimes ancient forms are also used. Female names almost always end in -α and -η, though a few end in -ώ with -ου being possible.

=== Demotic forms ===
Most Greek first names in Katharévousa (which can be considered the "official" form of the first name) generally correspond to a demotic form, as well as customary shortened and/or diminutive variations. The Katharévousa form, itself equivalent to the name's form in Ancient Greek, is used in official papers, while the demotic form or the shortened/diminutive forms are the forms used in everyday life.

Katharevousa	Demotic
Ιησούς (Iisoús)	
Ιωάννης (Ioannis)	Γιάννης (Yiannis)
Γεώργιος (Georgios)	Γιώργος (Yiorgos)
Μιχαήλ (Michail)	Μιχάλης (Michalis)
Γαβριήλ (Gavriil)	Γαβρίλος (Gavrilos)
Αντώνιος (Andonios)	Αντώνης (Andonis)
Ιάσων (Iason)	Ιάσονας (Iasonas)
Εμμανουήλ (Emmanouil)	Μανώλης (Manolis)

==== Changes in endings ====
Demotic forms tend to demonstrate endings that have undergone regularization. (For instance, in men's names, the oblique stem in the Katharévousa form is sometimes suffixed with -ας (gen. -α) to create the Demotic form of the name.)

Examples (format: nominative/genitive)
Ancient & Katharévousa	Demotic
-ωρ/-ορος	-ορας/-ορα
-ων/-ωνος	-ωνας/-ωνα
-ων/-ονος	-ονας/-ονα
-αξ/-ακος	-ακας/-ακα
-εύς/-έως	-έας/-εά
-ις*	-η/-ης -ιδα/-ιδας

*The oblique stems of the ancient names in -ις, whose descendants appear with -η/-ης and -ιδα/-ιδας, varied. At the very least, the initial origins of Demotic's -ιδα/-ιδας was almost certainly Ancient Greek's -ις/-ιδος (with the oblique stem being suffixed with -α/-ας).

=== Variations ===
==== Reason for variations ====
Since antiquity, there has been a strong tradition of naming the first and second sons after the paternal and maternal grandfathers and the first and second daughters after the paternal and maternal grandmothers. Although this tradition is partially challenged in modern urban Greece, it is still practiced in much of the country.

This results in a continuation of names in the family line, but cousins with the same official name are almost always called by different shortened forms or diminutives. These variants make it possible to differentiate between cousins despite these traditionally having the same official names because they are traditionally named after their grandparents.

==== Shortened forms ====
The use of shortened forms is widespread in Greek. Most Greek first names correspond to a customary shortened form. These are constructed by breaking one or more syllables, at the beginning or at the end of the first name, resulting in a form generally in two or even three syllables. The formation of these can be done according to different methods, either alone or combined with each other:

- Apheresis (loss of syllables at the beginning of the name); for example: Παναγιώτα (Panagióta) → Γιώτα (Gióta)
- Apocope (loss of syllables at the end of the name); for example: Νικόλαος (Nikólaos) → Νίκος (Níkos)
- Syncope (loss of syllables inside the name); for example: Θεόδωρος (Theódoros) → Θόδωρος (Thódoros)
- Assimilation (propagation of a sound on the neighboring sound); for example: Πηνελόπη (Pinelópi) → Πόπη (Pópi)
- Repetition; for example: Παρασκευή (Paraskeví) → Βιβή (Viví)
- Borrowing from another language, notably English; for example: Βασίλειος (Vasíleios) → Μπίλης (Bílis, Billy); Αθανασία (Athanasia) → Νάνσυ (Nánsy, Nancy)
- Using another shorter Greek name of similar sound; for example: Παρασκευάς (Paraskevas) → Πάρις (Paris)

==== Diminutives ====
Another method of variation is the use of diminutives. Diminutive forms are constructed by adding a suffix, either to the first name, or to the shortened version of the first name. The suffixes are generally:

- -άκης (-akis) or -ούλης (-oulis) for masculine nouns
- -ίτσα (-itsa), -ούλα (-oula), or -ιώ (-io) for feminine nouns

Examples of diminutives
First name	Shortened Form	Diminutive(s)
Ελένη (Eleni)		Ελενίτσα (Elenitsa)
Πέτρος (Petros)		Πετράκης, Πετρούλης (Petrakis, Petroulis)
Κωνσταντίνος (Konstantinos)	Κώστας (Kostas)	Κωστάκης (Kostakis)
Ειρήνη (Eirini)	Ρήνα (Rina)	Ρηνούλα, Ρηνιώ (Rinoula, Rinio)

==== Shortened versions of diminutives ====
Furthermore, diminutives themselves have shortened forms. For example, Takis may be short for Kostakis or Panagiotakis, themselves derived from Konstantinos and Panagiotis.

Examples of shortened diminutives
First name	Shortened Form	Diminutive	Shortened Diminutive
Παναγιώτης (Panagiotis)		Παναγιωτάκης (Panagiotakis)	Τάκης (Takis)
Δήμητρα (Dimitra)		Δημητρούλα (Dimitroula)	Ρούλα (Roula)
Κωνσταντίνος (Konstantinos)	Κώστας (Kostas)	Κωστάκης (Kostakis)	Τάκης (Takis)

=== Other trends ===
There is a strong clustering of first names by locality according to patron saints, famous churches, or monasteries. Examples:

- Spyridon or Spyridoula in Corfu
- Gerasimos or Gerasimoula in Kefalonia
- Dionysios and Dionysia in Zakynthos,
- Andreas or Andrea or Androulla in Patras and the rest of Achaea province, as well as Cyprus and Andreanos (Ανδρεάνος) or Andreana (Ανδρεάνα) Cyprus
- Markellos (Markos), or Markella in Chios
- Savvas, Charalambis for those descended from Asia Minor
- Emmanuel or Emmanuelos /Manolios / Manolis / Manios /Manusos Emmanuela or Emmanuelia / Manolía / Manólia / Mania (Manio), Iosif (Joseph) / Sifis or Iosifina (Josephine), Manousos, Minas or Mina, Myron in Crete
- Tsambikos or Tsampika /Mika, Katholikos or Katholiki, Archangelos or Archangela, Skiadenis or Skiadeni in Rhodes.
- Stratis or Stratoula and Taxiarchis or Taxiarchoula, Rafail or Rafailia, Myrsini in Lesbos.
- Myrtidiotissa, Myrto, Myrta, Myrtia in Kythira.
- Petros or Petroula (the patron saint of the city, Saint Peter the Wonderworker), Danaos, Danae, Iphigenia, Orestes, and Agamemnon in Argos Argolis

Regional variants and dialectal hypocoristics

In various Modern Greek dialects and idioms, given names (Christian names) frequently undergo phonetic and morphological modifications, taking distinct suffixes depending on the region. These variants are utilized either as hypocoristics (pet names) or as a means of adapting standard names into the phonology of the local dialect.

* Crete and the Aegean Islands: A highly characteristic feature is the formation of female hypocoristics ending in ''-io'' (''-ιώ''), such as ''Annio'' (from Anna), ''Mario'' (from Maria), '''Vasilio''' ( Vasileia), '''Manio''' (from Emmanouela or Mania, Manio), '''Lenio''' (from Eleni), and '''Stelio''' (from Styliani), while the form '''Manolia''' is also attested. Correspondingly, male names often take the suffix ''-ios'' or ''-akis'', such as ''Kostios'' or '''Yannios''' (from Ioannes) and '''Thomakis''' (from Thomas). For the name Emmanouil in particular, the dialectal variants '''Manios''', '''Manolios''', and '''Manousos''' are exceptionally widespread in Crete. Other prominent island variants include '''Giorgis''' or '''Giorgaros''' (from Georgios) and '''Stelis''' (from Stylianos). Due to historical Western (Venetian) influences, types like '''Tomazos''' (from Thomas) also appear.

* Mani and the Southern Peloponnese: There is a distinct regional tendency to shift female names into the neuter gender with the suffix ''-o'', primarily used as a term of endearment or familiarity. Characteristic examples include '''to Vasiliko''' (from Vasiliki),'''to Vasilio''' (from Vasilia) ''Annio'' or ''to Annio'' (from Anna), '''to Eleniko''' (from Eleni), and '''to Mitriko''' (a neuter pet form from Demetrios). Additionally, unique local variations and suffixes occur, such as '''Giorgounis''' (from Georgios), '''Petrounis''' (from Petros), '''Mitros''' (from Demetrios), '''Pota''' or '''Potoula''' (from Panagiota), and '''Tsandoula''' (from Alexandra).

* Northern Dialects (Epirus, Macedonia, Thessaly): Due to the vowel raising and unstressed vowel deletion typical of northern idioms, names differentiate significantly in their declension and form. For instance, the name Thomas is frequently found as '''Thomas''' (pronounced ''Θώμος'' in Epirus) or '''Matsios''' / '''Matsioras''' (in Macedonia). Similarly, the female names Vasiliki and Vasileia transform into the traditional dialectal types '''Vasilo''' or '''Vasiliko''', as well as the hypocoristics '''Katinko''' (from Aikaterini) and '''Tsia'''. In Epirus and Macedonia, male names often take unique local forms such as '''Kotsios''' or '''Kotsis''' (from Konstantinos), '''Metsios''' (from Demetrios or Thomas), '''Siomos''' / '''Tsiomos''' (from Thomas), and phonetic adaptations like '''Giorgous''' or '''Giogos''' (from Georgios). Particularly in the Epirotic idiom, male and female hypocoristics ending in ''-elis'' or ''-eli'' (''-έλης'' / ''-έλη'') are exceptionally common for widely used names, such as '''Yannelis''' (from Giannis), '''Giorgelis''' (from Giorgos), '''Kotsarelis''' (from Kostas), '''Fotelis''' (from Fotis), '''Marineli''' (from Marina), and '''Marieli''' (from Maria).

* Dodecanese and Cyprus: It is customary to use hypocoristic suffixes such as ''-oui'' (neuter) or ''-ouda'', for example ''Annoui'' or ''Mariouda''.

* Ionian Islands (Eptanisa): Due to heavy historical influences from the Italian language, names frequently adopt suffixes such as ''-etos'' / ''-eta'' or ''-inos'' / ''-ina'', such as ''Spyretos'' (from Spyridon) and ''Tzanetos'' (from Ioannes).

When Greek names are used in other languages, they are sometimes rendered phonetically, such as Eleni for Ἑλένη, and sometimes by their equivalents, like Helen in English or Hélène in French. Elisavet (Ελισάβετ) is Elizabeth in English or Élisabeth in French. In the United States, there are also conventional anglicizations based on phonetic similarity rather than etymology, for example James or Jimmy for Δημήτρης/Dimitris (nickname Ντίμης/Dimis, Ντέμης/Demis hence Jimmy), despite the English name James and its diminutive Jimmy actually coming from Greek Ἰάκωβος Iakobos, English Jacob (through Vulgar Latin Iacomus from Latin Iacobus, which is the Latinized form of Ἰάκωβος Iakobos in the Vulgate and originally the Greek New Testament).

== Family names ==
Greek family names are most commonly patronymics but may also be based on occupation, personal characteristics or location. The feminine version is usually the genitive of the family name of the woman's father or husband; so, for example, Mr. Yannatos and Mrs. Yannatou.

As a result of their codification in the Modern Greek state, surnames have Katharevousa forms even though Katharevousa is no longer the official standard. Thus, the Ancient Greek name Eleutherios forms the Modern Greek proper name Lefteris. In the past, people in speaking used the family name followed by the given name, so John Eleutherios was called Leftero-giannis. In modern practice he is called Giannis Eleftheriou, where Giannis is the popular form of the formal Ioannis but Eleftheriou is an archaic genitive. For women, the surname is usually a Katharevousa genitive of a male name, whereas back in Byzantine times there were separate feminine forms of male surnames, such as Palaiologína for Palaiológos which nowadays would be Palaiológou.

In the past, women would change their surname on first marrying to that of their husband in the genitive case, so marking the change of dependence to husband from father. In early Modern Greek society, women were named with -aina as a feminine suffix on the husband's given name, for example "Giorgaina" signifying "wife of George". Nowadays, a woman's surname does not change upon marriage but she can use the husband's surname socially. Children usually receive the paternal surname, though some children receive the maternal surname in addition or exclusively.

== Patronymic and matronymic ==
The use of the patronymic as part of a personal name in everyday language is scarce and virtually non-existent, unlike languages with Eastern Slavic naming customs. It is used in lieu of the father's full name and it is inserted between a person's given name and surname. The use of the matronymic is even more rare.

In a dated, self-styling practice, if Ioánnis Papadopoulos has a daughter whose first name is María and a son whose first name is Andreas, their full names will be María Ioánnou Papadopoúlou and Andréas Ioánnou Papadópoulos. If María then marries George Demetriádes, she may retain her maiden name or choose to be styled María Geōrgíou Demetriádou. If she is widowed, she will revert to her father's patronymic but retain her husband's surname to become María Ioánnou Demetriádou. This largely obsolete styling practice is not reflected in official documents or the spoken language, but could be utilized by, e.g., authors or anyone who uses his/her name for business purposes.

== Official documents ==
The foremost-and compulsory-identification document in Greece, the Greek identity card, includes name information as follows:

1. Surname (Επώνυμο)
2. Given name(s) (Όνομα)
3. Father's name (Όνομα Πατέρα)
4. Father's surname (Επώνυμο Πατέρα)
5. Mother's name (Όνομα Μητέρας)
6. Mother's surname (Επώνυμο Μητέρας)

Out of the six fields, only the first three are transliterated in Latin script per ELOT 743/ISO 843. The first two comprise the personal name and the rest is just identity information. The Cypriot identity card also includes father's and mother's name and surname in Greek and Latin script; however, all fields are transliterated.

In other significant identity documents, like the Greek passport and Greek driving license, compliant to European standards, the mother's and father's names are completely omitted. Corresponding documents in Cyprus omit them as well.

In other official documents in Greece, such as a marriage certificate, names are included accordingly (Surname/Given Names/Father's Name/Father's Surname/Mother's Name/Mother's Surname).

=== In education ===
In report cards and the Apolytirion, the students' names are displayed as "(student's full name) of (father's full name) and (mother's full name)".

However, in universities and specifically university degrees, the practice varies. For example, university degrees of the Aegean University displays graduates' names as "(student's surname and name) of (father's given name)", whilst degrees from the University of West Attica display both the patronymic and the matronymic.

== Examples of given names ==
=== Ancient names ===
1. Acamas (Ἀκάμας)
2. Aheos (Ἀχαιός)
3. Aiakides (Αιακίδης)
4. Achilles (Ἀχιλλεύς)
5. Adonis (Ἄδωνις)
6. Aeneas (Αἰνείας)
7. Agamemnon (Αγαμέμνων)
8. Agatha (Αγαθή)
9. Ayathocles (Ἀγαθοκλῆς)
10. Ayenor (Ἀγήνωρ)
11. Alcaeus (Ἀλκαῖος)
12. Alcestis (Άλκηστις)
13. Alcibiades (Ἀλκιβιάδης)
14. Alcman (Ἀλκμάν)
15. Alcyone (Ἀλκυόνη)
16. Alcyon (Αλκύοννος)
17. Alexandros (Ἀλέξανδρος)
18. Alexios (Αλέξιος)
19. Amalia (Αμαλία)
20. Ambrosius (Αμβρόσιος)
21. Amydas (Ἀμύντας)
22. Amymone (Αμυμώνη)
23. Anacreon (Ἀνακρέων)
24. Anargyros (Ανάργυρος)
25. Anatoli (Ανατολή)
26. Anaximandros (Ἀναξίμανδρος)
27. Antenor (Ἀντήνωρ)
28. Antiochus (Ἀντίoχoς)
29. Antiope (Αντιόπη)
30. Anthelia (Ανθήλεια)
31. Androcles (Ἀνδροκλῆς)
32. Andromache (Ἀνδρομάχη)
33. Andronicus (Ἀνδρόνικος)
34. Andromeda (Ἀνδρομέδα)
35. Antigone (Ἀντιγόνη)
36. Aphrodite (Ἀφροδίτη)
37. Amphitryon (Αμφιτρύων)
38. Amphitrite (Αμφιτρίτη)
39. Apollo (Απόλλων)
40. Apolleon (Απολλεών)
41. Apollonius (Απολλώνιος)
42. Apollonia (Απολλωνία)
43. Arcesilaus (Ἀρκεσίλαος)
44. Archelaus (Ἀρχέλαος)
45. Archelochus (Ἀρχέλοχος)
46. Archimedes (Ἀρχιμήδης)
47. Arete (Ἀρήτη)
48. Areti (Aρετή)
49. Argus (Ἀργός)
50. Ariadne (Ἀριάδνη)
51. Aristarchus (Ἀρίσταρχος)
52. Aristides (Ἀριστείδης)
53. Aristea (Αριστέα)
54. Aristippus (Ἀρίστιππος)
55. Aristo (Ἀρίστων)
56. Aristocles (Ἀριστοκλῆς)
57. Aristomenis (Αριστομένης)
58. Aristophanes (Ἀριστοφάνης)
59. Aristotle (Ἀριστοτέλης)
60. Αrtemios (Αρτέμιος)
61. Artemis (Ἄρτεμις)
62. Artemisia (disambiguation) (Αρτεμισία)
63. Arion (Ἀρίων)
64. Aspasia (Ἀσπασία)
65. Athena (Ἀθηνᾶ)
66. Athenodoros (Ἀθηνόδωρος)
67. Atreus (Ἀτρεύς)
68. Berenice (Βερενίκη)
69. Briseis (Βρισηίδα)
70. Calchas (Κάλχας)
71. Calliope (Καλλιόπη)
72. Callirrhoe (Καλλιρρόη)
73. Cassandra (Κασσάνδρα)
74. Cassiopeia (Κασσιόπεια)
75. Circe (Κίρκη)
76. Cybele (Κυβέλη)
77. Chryses (Χρύσης)
78. Cimon (Κίμων)
79. Cleanthes (Κλεάνθης)
80. Clearchus (Κλέαρχος)
81. Clelia (Κλέλια)
82. Cleopatra (Κλεοπάτρα)
83. Clio (Κλειώ)
84. Clymenus (Κλύμενος)
85. Clymene (Κλυμένη)
86. Clytaemnestra (Κλυταιμνήστρα)
87. Coön (Κόων)
88. Creon (Κρέων)
89. Crino (Κρινώ)
90. Daedalus (Δαίδαλος)
91. Danaë (Δανάη)
92. Danaos (Δαναός)
93. Daphne (Δάφνη)
94. Demeter (Δημήτηρ)
95. Democritus (Δημόκριτος)
96. Demoleon (Δημολέων)
97. Demosthenes (Δημοσθένης)
98. Despina (Δέσποινα)
99. Diagoras (Διαγόρας)
100. Diocles (Διοκλῆς)
101. Diodorus (Διόδωρος)
102. Diogenes (Διογένης)
103. Diomedes (Διομήδης)
104. Dionysios (Διονύσιος)
105. Dionysia (Διονυσία)
106. Dionysus (Διόνυσος)
107. Dione (Διώνη)
108. Electra (Ἡλέκτρα)
109. Ellie (Έλλη)
110. Empedocles (Ἐμπεδοκλῆς)
111. Epictetus (Ἐπίκτητος)
112. Epicurus (Ἐπίκουρος)
113. Eratosthenes (Ἐρατοσθένης)
114. Eteocles (Ἐτεοκλῆς)
115. Euclid (Εὐκλείδης)
116. Eucratides (Εὐκρατίδης)
117. Euripides (Εὐριπίδης)
118. Europa (Εὐρώπη)
119. Eurydice (Εὐρυδίκη)
120. Eurymachus (Εὐρύμαχος)
121. Eurystheus (Ευρυσθέας)
122. Euterpe (Ευτέρπη)
123. Euthydemus (Εὐθύδημος)
124. Euthymia (Εὐθυμία)
125. Gaea (Γαῖα)
126. Glaucus (Γλαῦκος)
127. Gorgias (Γοργίας)
128. Harmonia (Ἁρμονία)
129. Hector (Ἕκτωρ)
130. Helen (Ἑλένη)
131. Helianthe (Ἡλιάνθη)
132. Helicaon (Ἑλικάων)
133. Heliodorus (Ἡλιόδωρος)
134. Hera (Ἥρα)
135. Heracles (Ἡρακλῆς)
136. Heraclea (Ηράκλεια)
137. Hermes (Ἑρμῆς)
138. Hermione (Ἑρμιόνη)
139. Herodotus (Ἡρόδοτος)
140. Heron (Ερωδιός)
141. Hesiod (Ἡσίοδος)
142. Hippocrates (Ἱπποκράτης)
143. Hippolyte (Ἱππολύτη)
144. Hippolytus (Ἱππόλυτος)
145. Homer (Ὅμηρος)
146. Hyacinth (Ὑάκινθος)
147. Hypatia (Ὑπατία)
148. Ia (Ία)
149. Ianthe (Ἰάνθη)
150. Icarus (Ἴκαρος)
151. Idomeneus (Ἰδομενεύς)
152. Ilaira (Ιλάειρα)
153. Iliad (Ιλιάδα)
154. Ino (Ἰνώ)
155. Ion (Ἴων)
156. Iphidamas (Ἰφιδάμας)
157. Iphigenia (Ἰφιγένεια)
158. Irene/Irini (Εἰρήνη)
159. Isioni (Ησιόνη)
160. Ismene (Ἰσμήνη)
161. Iole (Ιόλη)
162. Jason (Ἰάσων)
163. Jocasta (Ἰοκάστη)
164. Kallisti (Καλλίστη)
165. Kallisto (Καλλιστώ)
166. Kallipateira (Καλλιπάτειρα)
167. Laodamas (Λαοδάμας)
168. Laodice (Λαοδίκη)
169. Leonidas (Λεωνίδας)
170. Leto (Λητώ)
171. Lycurgus (Λυκοῦργος)
172. Medea (Μήδεια)
173. Melpomene (Μελπομένη)
174. Menander (Μένανδρος)
175. Menelaus (Μενέλαος)
176. Menia (Μένια)
177. Merope (Μερόπη)
178. Metrodorus (Μητρόδωρος)
179. Miltiades (Μιλτιάδης)
180. Minos (Μίνωας)
181. Mirka (Μίρκα)
182. Myron (Μύρων)
183. Myrto (Μυρτώ)
184. Myrtali (Μυρτάλη)
185. Nauplius (Ναύπλιος)
186. Nausimedon (Ναυσιμέδων)
187. Narcissus (Νάρκισσος)
188. Neoptolemus (Νεοπτόλεμος)
189. Nestor (Νέστωρ)
190. Nefeli (Νεφέλη)
191. Nicander (Νίκανδρος)
192. Nicanor (Nικάνωρ)
193. Nicodemus (Νικόδημος)
194. Nike (Νίκη)
195. Nikolaos (Νικόλαος)
196. Oceanus (Ὠκεανός)
197. Odysseus (Ὀδυσσεύς)
198. Oedipus (Οἰδίπους)
199. Olympia (Ολυμπία)
200. Olympias (Ὀλυμπιάς)
201. Orestis (Ὀρέστης)
202. Oiax (Οίακας)
203. Orpheus (Ὀρφεύς)
204. Pandora (Πανδώρα)
205. Penthesilea (Πανθεσίλεια)
206. Pantaleon (Πανταλέων)
207. Paris (Πάρις)
208. Patroclus (Πάτροκλος)
209. Pausanias (Παυσανίας)
210. Pegasus (Πήγασος)
211. Peleus (Πηλεύς)
212. Penelope (Πηνελόπη)
213. Pericles (Περικλῆς)
214. Perseus (Περσέας)
215. Persephone (Περσεφόνη)
216. Phaedon (Φαίδων)
217. Phaedra (Φαίδρα)
218. Pheidias or Phidias (Φειδίας)
219. Phenia (Φένια)
220. Philippos (Φίλιππος)
221. Philoctetes (Φιλοκτήτης)
222. Philon (Φίλων)
223. Phoebus (Φοίβος)
224. Phoebe (Φοίβη)
225. Phyllis (Φυλλίς)
226. Pindar (Πίνδαρος)
227. Plato (Πλάτων)
228. Platena (Πλάτενα)
229. Polemon (Πολέμωνος)
230. Polybus (Πόλυβος)
231. Polynices (Πολυνείκης)
232. Polybios (Πολύβιος)
233. Polyxenios (Πολυξένιος)
234. Polyxenia (Πολυξένια)
235. Polyxenos (Πολυξένος)
236. Polyxeni (Πολυξένη)
237. Pretos (Προίτος)
238. Priam (Πρίαμος)
239. Prometheus (Προμηθέας)
240. Ptolemy (Πτολεμαῖος)
241. Pythagoras (Πυθαγόρας)
242. Pyrrhus (Πύρρος)
243. Rhea (Ῥέα)
244. Selene (Σελήνη)
245. Seleucus (Σέλευκος)
246. Semeli (Σεμέλη)
247. Simonides (Σιμωνίδης)
248. Socrates (Σωκράτης)
249. Solon (Σόλων)
250. Sophocles (Σοφοκλῆς)
251. Strato (Στράτων)
252. Talthybius (Ταλθύβιος)
253. Telemachus (Τηλέμαχος)
254. Tethys (Τηθύς)
255. Teukros (Τεύκρος)
256. Thaleia (Θάλεια)
257. Thenia (Θένια)
258. Theano (Θεανώ)
259. Thekla (Θέκλα)
260. Theophanes (Θεοφάνης)
261. Theofania (Θεοφανία)
262. Themistocles (Θεμιστοκλῆς)
263. Theodoros (Θεόδωρος)
264. Theodora (Θεοδώρα)
265. Theophrastus (Θεόφραστος)
266. Theseus (Θησεύς)
267. Thestor (Θέστωρ)
268. Thetis (Θέτις)
269. Thraso (Θράσων)
270. Thrasybulus (Θρασύβουλος)
271. Thrasymachus (Θρασύμαχος)
272. Thucydides (Θουκυδίδης)
273. Urania (Οὐρανία)
274. Uranus (Οὐρανός)
275. Xanthi (Ξανθή)
276. Xanthippe (Ξανθίππη)
277. Xenocrates (Ξενοκράτης)
278. Xenophon (Ξενοφῶν)
279. Zeno (Ζήνων)
280. Zeus (Δίας)

=== Biblical and Christian names ===
1. Aikaterine (Αἰκατερίνη)
2. Alexios (Ἀλέξιος)
3. Alice (Αλίκη)
4. Amaryllis (Αμαρυλλίς)
5. Ananias (Ἀνανίας)
6. Anastasios (Ἀναστάσιος)
7. Archangelos (Αρχάγγελος)
8. Archangelia (Αρχαγγελία)
9. Αrgie (Αργυρώ)
10. Arleta (Αρλέτα)
11. Andreas (Ἀνδρέας)
12. Andrea (Άνδρεα / Ανδρέα)
13. Andreanos (Ανδρεάνος / νός)
14. Andreana (Ανδρεάνα)
15. Angelos (Άγγελος)
16. Angie (Αγγελική)
17. Anna (Ἄννα)
18. Anthi (Ανθή)
19. Anthimos (Ἄνθιμος)
20. Antonios (Ἀντώνιος)
21. Athanasios (Ἀθανάσιος)
22. Athenais (Αθηναΐς)
23. Agnes (Αγνή)
24. Adam (Αδάμ)
25. Adrian (Αδριανός)
26. Adriana (Αδριάνα)
27. Barbara (Βαρβάρα)
28. Bartholomaios (Βαρθολομαῖος)
29. Valentine (Βαλεντίνος)
30. Valentina (Βαλεντίνα)
31. Valerius (Βαλέριος)
32. Valeria (Βαλέρια)
33. Valia (Βάλια)
34. Vanessa (Βανέσσα)
35. Vasileios / Vasilios (Βασίλειος)
36. Vasileia (Βασιλεία)
37. Vasilikos (Βασιλικός)
38. Vasiliki (Βασιλική)
39. Vasilisa (Βασίλισσα)
40. Venetios (Βενέτιος)
41. Venetia (Βενετία)
42. Violanda (Βιολάντα)
43. Violeta (Βιολέτα)
44. Victor (Βίκτωρας)
45. Victoria (Βικτώρια / Βικτωρία)
46. Virginia (Βιργινία)
47. Vitalis (Βιτάλης)
48. Vagia (Βάϊα / Βάγια)
49. Calliope (Καλλιόπη)
50. Cassian (Κασσιανή)
51. Corina (Κορίνα)
52. Charalambos (Χαράλαμπος)
53. Charilaos (Χαρίλαος)
54. Chariclea (Χαρίκλεια)
55. Charytin (Χαριτίνη)
56. Christianos (Χριστιανός)
57. Christiana (Χριστιάνα)
58. Christos (Χρίστος / Χρήστος)
59. Christina (Χριστίνα)
60. Christoforos (Χριστόφορος)
61. Chloe (Χλόη)
62. Damianos (Δαμιανός)
63. Daniel (Δανιήλ)
64. Daniela (Δανιέλα)
65. David (Δαβίδ)
66. Devora (Δεββώρα)
67. Dimitrios (Δημήτριος)
68. Despina (Δέσποινα)
69. Dioscoros (Διόσκουρος)
70. Dorotheos (Δωροθέος)
71. Dorothea (Δωροθέα)
72. Eleutherius (Ελευθέριος)
73. Eleni (Ἑλένη)
74. Eleonora (Ελεονώρα)
75. Elias (Ἠλίας)
76. Elia (Ήλια)
77. Eliana (Ηλιάνα)
78. Elizabeth (Ἐλισάβετ)
79. Emmanouil (Εμμανουήλ)
80. Emmanuella (Εμμανουέλα)
81. Emmelia (Εμμέλια)
82. Emina (Εμίνα)
83. Epiphanius (Επιφάνιος)
84. Erastus (Ἔραστος)
85. Erato (Ερατώ)
86. Erotokritos (Ερωτόκριτος)
87. Erophile (Ερωφίλη)
88. Errico (Ερρίκος)
89. Erietta (Εριέττα)
90. Eudocia (Εὐδοκία)
91. Evgenia (Εὐγενία)
92. Eusebius (Εὐσέβιος)
93. Eustratios (Ευστράτιος)
94. Eva (Εύα)
95. Evangelos (Εὐάγγελος)
96. Evangelie (Ευαγγελία)
97. Evelina (Εβελίνα)
98. Eve (Εύη)
99. Fanourios (Φανούριος)
100. Fanouria (Φανουρία)
101. Filio (Φιλιώ)
102. Fotios (Φώτιος)
103. Fotia (Φωτία)
104. Fotinos (Φωτεινός)
105. Fotini (Φωτεινή)
106. Gabriel (Γαβριήλ)
107. Gabriela (Γαβριέλα)
108. Georgios (Γεώργιος)
109. Gerasimos (Γεράσιμος)
110. Glykeria (Γλυκερία)
111. Grigorios (Γρηγόριος)
112. Hebe (Ήβη)
113. Iakovos (Ἰάκωβος)
114. Ieremias (Ἱερεμίας)
115. Icarus (Ίκαρος)
116. Ieronymos (Ιερώνυμος)
117. Ignatios (Ιγνάτιος)
118. Irene (Εἰρήνη)
119. Isidore (Ισίδωρος)
120. Isidora (Ισιδώρα)
121. Isaakios (Ισαάκιος)
122. Isaac (Ισαάκ)
123. Isaias (Ἠσαΐας)
124. Joachim (Ἰωακείμ)
125. Joannis (Ἰωάννης)
126. Joanna (Ιωάννα)
127. Jonah (Ἰωνᾶς)
128. Joseph (Ἰωσήφ)
129. Josephine (Ιωσηφίνα)
130. Joulia (Ιουλία)
131. Kallinikos (Καλλίνικος)
132. Kalomira (Καλομοίρα)
133. Konstantinos (Κωνσταντῖνος)
134. Kyrillos (Κύριλλος)
135. Lazaros (Λάζαρος)
136. Lambros (Λάμπρος)
137. Lavrentios (Λαυρέντιος)
138. Leo (Λέων)
139. Leonidas (Λεωνίδας)
140. Liza (Λίζα)
141. Loukas (Λουκᾶς)
142. Loukia (Λουκία)
143. Lucian (Λουκιανός)
144. Lydia (Λυδία)
145. Luisa (Λουίζα)
146. Ludovico (Λουδοβίκος)
147. Magdalene (Μαγδαληνή)
148. Magnolia (Μανώλια)
149. Makarios (Μακάριος)
150. Mánia (Μάνια)
151. Margaret (Μαργαρίτα)
152. Marios (Μάριος)
153. Maria (Μαρία)
154. Mariannos (Μαριάννος)
155. Marianna (Μαριάννα)
156. Marinella (Μαρινέλλα)
157. Marinos (Μαρίνος)
158. Marina (Μαρίνα)
159. Markos (Μάρκος)
160. Marcellus (Μάρκελος / Μάρκελλος)
161. Marcellα (Μαρκέλλα)
162. Martha (Μάρθα)
163. Marianthi (Μαριάνθη)
164. Matthaios (Ματθαῖος)
165. Maximos (Μάξιμος)
166. Maximilian (Μαξιμιλιανός)
167. Melina (Μελίνα)
168. Melitine (Μελιτίνη)
169. Michael (Μιχαήλ/Μιχάλης)
170. Miranda (Μιράντα)
171. Moses (Μωϋσῆς)
172. Myrtia (Μυρτιά)
173. Napoleon (Ναπολέων)
174. Napoleon (Ναπολεών)
175. Nectarius (Νεκτάριος)
176. Nicanor (Nικάνωρ)
177. Nicodemus (Νικόδημος)
178. Nicolaos (Νικόλαος)
179. Nicole (Νικολέτα)
180. Niketas (Νικήτας)
181. Nikephoros (Νικηφόρος)
182. Ninos (Νίνος)
183. Nina (Νίνα)
184. Ortansia (Ορτανσία)
185. Oreozili (Ωραιοζήλη)
186. Pagona (Παγώνα)
187. Panayiotis (Παναγιώτης)
188. Panteleimon/Pantelis (Παντελεήμων)
189. Paraskeve (Παρασκευή)
190. Pansemni (Πανσέμνη)
191. Pavlos (Παῦλος)
192. Pavlina (Παυλίνα)
193. Peonia (Παιώνια)
194. Polina (Πωλίνα)
195. Pigi (Πηγή)
196. Petros (Πέτρος)
197. Poseidon (Ποσειδών)
198. Philemon (Φιλήμων)
199. Procopios (Προκόπιος)
200. Raphael (Ραφαήλ)
201. Raphaelia (Ραφαηλία)
202. Rebecca (Ρεβέκκα)
203. Rigas (Ρήγας)
204. Rovértos (Ροβέρτος)
205. Rosa (Ρόζα)
206. Roubini (Ρουμπίνη)
207. Savvas (Σάββας)
208. Sakellarios (Σακελλαριος)
209. Sarah (Σάρα)
210. Seraphim (Σεραφείμ)
211. Sergios (Σέργιος)
212. Silas (Σίλας)
213. Simeon (Συμεών)
214. Simos (Σίμος, Σύμος)
215. Simoni (Σιμώνη)
216. Smaragda (Σμαράγδα)
217. Solomon (Σολομών)
218. Somos (Σόμος)
219. Sofia (Σοφία)
220. Sultana (Σουλτάνα)
221. Spyridon (Σπυρίδων)
222. Stamatina (Σταματίνα)
223. Staurakios (Σταυράκιος)
224. Staikos (Στάϊκος)
225. Stavros (Σταῦρος)
226. Stacy (Αναστασία)
227. Stefanos (Στέφανος)
228. Stylianos (Στυλιανός / Στέλιος)
229. Styliani (Στυλιανή / Στέλλα)
230. Styliana (Στυλιάνα / Στέλλα)
231. Tatiana (Τατιάνα)
232. Thaddeus (Θαδδαῖος)
233. Theofilos (Θεόφιλος)
234. Theοlοgos (Θεολόγος)
235. Thomas (Θωμάς)
236. Thomai (Θωμαή)
237. Thomais (Θωμαΐς)
238. Thomaida (Θωμαΐδα)
239. Timotheos (Τιμόθεος)
240. Yvonne (Υβόννη)
241. Zacharias (Ζαχαρίας)
242. Zoe (Ζωή)

=== Mixed names ===
1. Amelia / Elina (Αμελίνα)
2. Angeliki / Elina (Αγγελίνα)
3. Aimilios / Ioannis (Αιμιλιάννος / Αιμιλιαννός)
4. Aimilia / Anna (Αιμιλιάννα / Εμιλιάννα)
5. Aimilia / Lenia (Αιμιλένια)
6. Anna / Maria (Ανναμαρία)
7. Andreas / Ioannis (Ανδρεάννος or Ανδρεαννός)
8. Andonia / Elina (Αντελίνα)
9. Andrea / Anna (Ανδρεάννα)
10. Aria / Anna (Αριάννα)
11. Argyro / Nikoleta (Αρλέτα)
12. Anthi / Apostolia (Ανθήλια)
13. Anthi / Elia (Ανθέλια)
14. Christina / Anna (Χριστιάννα)
15. Christiana / Elina (Χριστελίνα)
16. Christina / Elina (Χριστελίνα)
17. Chrysa / Elina (Χρυσελίνα)
18. Chrysa / Anthi (Χρυσάνθη)
19. Eirini / Anna (Ειρηάννα)
20. Eleni / Anna (Ελεάννα)
21. Ellie / Georgia (Ελληζέτ)
22. Elina / Anthi (Ελιάνθη)
23. Emmelia / Elina (Εμμελίνα)
24. Evangelia / Angeliki (Ευαγγελική)
25. Georgia / Elena (Γιωλένα)
26. Evangelia / Elina (Ευαγγελίνα)
27. Georgia / Anna (Γεωργιάννα)
28. Georgia / Eva (Γεύα)
29. Georgia / Paraskeve (Γεύη)
30. Georgia / Vanessa (Γιοβάνα)
31. Georgia / Nikoleta / tta (Ζωρζέτα /ττα)
32. Ilia / Anna (Ηλιάννα)
33. Ilia / Anthi (Ηλιάνθη)
34. Ioanna / Vanessa (Ιωβάνα)
35. Ioannis / Markos (Γιαννμάρκος)
36. Kalomira / Anthi (Καλομοιράνθη)
37. Kleio / Nikoleta (Κλεονίκη)
38. Kleio / Patra (Κλεοπάτρα)
39. Luiza / Anna (Λουιζάννα)
40. Luiza / Ioanna (Λουιζιάννα)
41. Magdalene / Lenia (Μαγδαλένια)
42. Maria / Adamadia (Μαριάντα)
43. Maria / Anna (Μαριάννα)
44. Maria / Anthi (Μαριάνθη)
45. Maria / Apostolia (Μαρίλια)
46. Maria / Vasileia (Μαρισίλεια /Μαριβάσια /σεια)
47. Maria / Vasiliki (Μαριβάσια / Μαριβίκυ /κη)
48. Maria / Vili (Μαριβήλη / Ίλη)
49. Maria / Georgia (Μαριτζίνα / Μάγια)
50. Maria / Margarita (Μαρίτα)
51. Maria / Elena (Μαριέλενα / Μαριλένα / Μαριαλένα)
52. Maria / Eleni (Μαριλένη / Μαριαλένη)
53. Maria / Eleutheria (Μαριθέα / Μαρίλθεια)
54. Maria / Eva (Μαριεύα / Μαρεύα)
55. Marina / Ellie (Μαρινέλλη)
56. Maria / Ellie (Μαριέλλη)
57. Maria / Elina (Μαριλίνα)
58. Maria / Erietta (Μαριέττα)
59. Maria / Evrydíki (Μαριεύη)
60. Maria / Ilia (Μαριήλια)
61. Maria / liana (Μαριλιάνα)
62. Maria / Iliana (Μαριηλιάνα)
63. Maria / Lenia (Μαριλένια)
64. Maria / Liza (Μαριλίζα)
65. Maria / Nektaria (Μάνια)
66. Maria / Nikoleta / tta (Μαριέτα / ττα)
67. Maria / Paraskeve (Μαριεύη)
68. Maria / Renia (Μαριρένια)
69. Maria / Christina (Μαριτίνα)
70. Maria / Fotini (Μαριφαίη)
71. Marina / Georgia (Μαριντζίνα)
72. Maria / Zenia (Μαριζένια)
73. Marina / Nektaria (Μάρνια)
74. Marios / Ioannis (Μαριάννος)
75. Melina / Anthi (Μελίανθη)
76. Miltiada / Elena (Μιλένα)
77. Nikoleta / Elina (Νικολίνα)
78. Orestia / Elia (Ορέλια / Ορεστιέλια)
79. Orestia / Eliana (Ορελιάνα)
80. Orestiada / Elia (Ορέλια / Ορεστιέλια)
81. Paraskeve / Anna (Βιβιάννα)
82. Raphaela / Ilia (Ραφαήλια)
83. Raphael / Ilias (Ραφαήλιος)
84. Raphaelia / Anna (Ραφαηλιάννα)
85. Stavroula / Paraskeve (Σταύη)
86. Styliani / Anna (Στυλιάννα)
87. Styliani / Elina (Στελίνα)
88. Vivi / Anna (Βιβιάννα)
89. Viviani / Anna (Βιβιανιάννα)
90. Vasileia / Anna (Βασιλειάννα)
91. Vasiliki / Anna (Βασιλιάννα)
92. Vasileia / Elina (Βασιλείνα)
93. Vasiliki / Elina (Βασιλίνα)
94. Vasileia / Elena (Βασιλένα)
95. Vasiliki / Elena (Βασιλένα)
96. Vasileia / Eleni (Βασιλένη)
97. Vasiliki / Eleni (Βασιλένη)
98. Violeta / Nikoletta (Βιολέττα)
99. Violeta / Erietta (Βιολέττα)

=== Diminutive names ===
- Adamantia (Ντία)
- Alkiviadis (Άλκης)
- Anastasios (Αναστάσης, Τάσος, Τάσης, Τασούλης, Σούλης)
- Anastasia (Αναστασούλα, Νατάσσα, Τασούλα, Σούλα, Τασσώ, Τασία, Σία, Σίσσυ)
- Angelikos (Άγγελος, Αγγελής, Άντζελος)
- Angeliki (Αγγελικώ, Αγγελικούλα, Αγγέλλω, Αγγέλα, Άντζελα, Άντζυ, Γκέλη, Γκέλυ)
- Anthelia (Άνθεια)
- Antonis (Τόνης)
- Antonia (Τόνια)
- Apostolis (Τόλης)
- Apostolia (Τόλια, Λία)
- Andreana (Ανδρέα, Άνδρεα,)
- Andriana (Άνδρια)
- Archangelos (Άγγελος, Άτζελος)
- Archangelia (Αρχαγγέλα, Αγγέλα, Άντζελα, Άντζυ, Γκέλυ)
- Argyro (Αργυρούλα, Υρώ, Ρούλα, Σύλβια)
- Athanasios (Θανάσης, Θάνος, Σάκης, Νάσος)
- Athanasia (Νάσια, Θανάσω, Νάνσυ)
- Athena (Νανά, Νίνα)
- Barbara (Βέρα)
- Calliope (Kάλλη)
- Charalambos (Χάρης, Λάμπης, Μπάμπης, Χάμπος, Πάμπος)
- Diamantia (Διαμάντα, Διαμάντω, Ντία)
- Demetrios (Δημήτρης, Δημητράκης, Μήτσος, Μητσάκος, Μίμης, Μιμάκος, Μιμίκος, Ντέμης)
- Demetra (Δημητρούλα, Μίτση, Μιμή, Μιμίκα, Ντέμη)
- Demosthenes (Δήμος)
- Dionysios (Διονύσης, Διονυσάκης, Ντένης, Νιόνιος)
- Dionysia (Διώνη, Διόνη, Διονυσούλα, Ντένη, Ντένια)
- Dorotheos (Δώρος)
- Dorothea (Δώρα)
- Efsevia (Σέβη)
- Eleni (Ελενιώ, Λενιώ, Έλεν, Λένη, Νίτσα)
- Eleana (Λεάνα)
- Elena (Λένα)
- Eleonora (Νώρα)
- Eliana (Έλια)
- Elina (Λίνα)
- Elisavet (Έλσα, Ελιζέτ)
- Emmanouellia (Εμμανουέλα, Εμμανουέλλα, Μανουέλα, Μανώλια)
- Ersília (Έρση, Σήλια)
- Εvangelos (Βαγγέλης, Βαγγελάκης, Βάγγος, Εύανς)
- Evridiki (Εύη)
- Florentia (Φλωρέντα, Φλωρένα, Φλωρίνα, Φλωρίντα, Φλώρα)
- Fotios (Φώτης)
- Fotía (Φώτω,Φωτούλα)
- Foteini (Φώφη, Φαίη, Φίφη, Φωφώ)
- Georgia (Γεωργούλα, Γιωργούλα, Γιωργίτσα, Γιωργία, Γωγώ, Ζέτα, Τζίνα)
- Gethsemani (Μανή)
- Iliana (Ήλια)
- Kallisti (Κάλλη)
- Katholiki (Κική)
- Konstantinos (Κώστας, Κωστής, Κωστάκης, Κωτσάκος, Ντίνος)
- Konstantina (Ντίνα, Ναντίνα, Νάντια, Κωστούλα)
- Kyriakos (Κιριακούλης, Κυριακάκης, κούλης, Άκης, Κίτσος, Κικτσάκος)
- Kyriaki (Κική, Κυριακούλα, Κούλα, Ύρια, Κορίνα, Κίτσα, Κικίτσα, Σάντη, Σάντυ, Ντομένικα)
- Lenia (Λένα)
- Louiza (Λίζα)
- Lycurgus (Λή)
- Magdalene (Μάγδα)
- Magdalena (Mάγδα)
- Margarita (Ρίτα)
- Maria (Μαρούλα, Μάρω, Μαράκι, Μαριώ, Μάρα, Μάϊρα, Μαρίκα, Μαίρη)
- Markellos (Μάρκος)
- Melitini (Μελίνη)
- Melitina (Μελίνα)
- Michail (Μιχάλης, Μιχαλάκης, Μιχαλιός, Μιχάλας)
- Myrtali (Μύρτα)
- Nepheli (Φέλη, Ελίφ).
- Nikoleta (Κολέτα, Νίκη)
- Oreozíli / Oreozília (Ζήλη, Ζήλια, Ωραίλη, Ωραιήλη, Ωραίλια, Ωραιήλια)
- Pagona (Πέγκυ, Πένυ)
- Panagiotis (Πάνος, Πανάγιος, Παναγής, Γιώτης, Τάκης, Νότης, Πότης)
- Panagiota (Γιώτα, Πέννυ, Πέγκυ, Νάγια, Πανάγιω Νότα)
- Panagioula (Πανάγιω, Γιούλα)
- Panagoula (Πανάγω, Γούλα)
- Panagiouli (Πανάγιω, Γιούλη)
- Panagouli (Πανάγω, Γούλη)
- Penthesilea (Σίλεια)
- Paraskevi / Paraskeve (Παρασκευούλα, Εύη, Βιβή, Εβίτα, Βούλα)
- Phaedon (Φαίδωνας, Φαιδωνάκος)
- Polyxenia (Ξένια)
- Polyxeni (Ξένη)
- Rafailia (Ραφαέλα)
- Revveka (Βέκα, Μπέκα)
- Renia (Ρένα)
- Sasylia (Σύλια)
- Semina (Εμίνα)
- Sesilia (Σίλια)
- Sevasti (Σέβη)
- Sevastiani (Σέβη)
- Styliani (Στέλλα)
- Styliana (Στέλλα)
- Theofanis (Φάνης, θένιος)
- Theofania (Φανή, Θένια, Φένια)
- Thomas (Θωμάκος)
- Viviani (Βιβιάνα, Βίβιαν)
- Valantia (Βάλια)
- Vanessa (Bάνα)
- Vasileios (Βασίλης, Βασιλάκης, Σίλειος.)
- Vasileia (Βασιλειώ, Σίλεια, Βάσια)
- Vasiliki (Βασιλικώ, Βασιλικούλα, Βίκη, Βίκυ.)
- Vasilió (Βασίλω)
- Vaso (Βασούλα)
- Victoría / Victória (Βίκω, Βίκο)
- Vilelmini (Βίλλυ, Βίλυ)
- Ζenia (Ζένα)

=== Male / Female name ===
- Archangelos / Archangela
- Archangelios / Archangelia
- Angelos / Angéla
- Angelikos / Angeliki
- Andreas / Andrea
- Andreanos / Andreana
- Andrianos / Andriana
- Alexandros / Alexandra
- Alexios / Alexia
- Alexis / Alexa
- Vivos / Vivi
- Vivianos / Viviani
- Vallerianos / Valleriana
- Valerios / Valeria
- Vasilios / Vasileia
- Vasilikos / Vasiliki
- Vasiliós / Vasilió
- Vasos / Vaso
- Venetios / Venetia
- Gavriil / Gavriilia
- Gavrielos / Gavriela
- Emmanouil / Emmanouilia
- Emmanouelos / Emmanouela
- Manolis / Manólia
- Manoliós / Manolía
- Marios / Maria
- Mariánnos / Marianna
- Marianós / Marianí
- Aimílios / Aimilía
- Aimiliános / Aimiliána
- Aimilianós / Aimilianí
- Ilías / Ília
- Iliános / Iliána
- Ilianós / Ilianí
- Liános / Liána
- Nikοlaos / Nikoleta
- Nikolios / Nikolia
- Nikos / Niki
- Michail / Michailia
- Michaelos / Michaela
- Fotinos / Fotini
- Fotios / Fotía
- Polyxenios / Polyxenia
- Polyxenos / Polyxeni
- Panagios / Panagioula
- Panagos / Panagoula
- Christianos / Christiana
- Christianos / Christani
- Christos / Christina
- Rafaílios / Rafaília
- Rafaelos / Rafaela
- Rafaíl / Rafailía
- Rafaílos / Rafaíla
- Stamatios / Stamatia
- Stamatinos / stamatina
- Stylianos / styliani
- Styliános / Styliana

=== Autonomous names ===
- Eleni (Ελένη)
- Eleana (Ελεάνα)
- Elena (Έλενα)
- Elina (Ελίνα)
- Evelina (Εβελίνα)
- Lenia (Λένια)
- Vivi (Βιβή)
- Valia (Βάλια)
- Vasiliki (Βασιλική)
- Vasos (Βάσως)
- Vaso (Βάσω)
- Vasilia (Βασιλεία)
- Vasilios (Bασιλιός)
- Vasilió (Βασιλιώ)
- Renia (Ρένια)
- Aliki (Αλίκη)
- Melina (Μελίνα)
- Zenia (Ζένια)

=== Names with the same diminutive ===
- Angelikos / Archangelos (Άγγελος)
- Vasilia / Panthesilia (Σίλεια)
- Vasilios / Panthesilios (Σίλειος)
- Kyriaki / Katholiki (Κική, Κούλα)
- Kyriakos / Katholikos (Κούλης)
- Myrto / Myrtia / Myrtali / Myrtidiotissa (Μύρτα)
- Panagiota / Pagona (Πέγκυ)
- Paraskevi / Evridiki (Εύη)
- Paraskevi / Stavroula (Βούλα)
- Theodora / Dorothea (Δώρα)
- Theodoros / Dorotheos (Δώρος)
- Dimosthenis / Dimokritos (Δήμος)
- Stavroula / Zaxaroula (Ρούλα)

The most common names

- Anna (Άννα)
- Anastasia (Αναστασία)
- Eleni (Ελένη)
- Sofia (Σοφία)
- Maria (Μαρία)
- Katerina (Κατερίνα)
- Irene (Ειρήνη)
- Christina (Χριστίνα)

Τhe names that are not common

- Athina (Αθηνά)
- Areti (Αρετή)
- Vasiliki (Βασιλική)
- Dimitra (Δήμητρα)
- Dionysia (Διονυσία)
- Evanthia (Ευανθία)
- Nektaria (Νεκταρία)
- Panagiota (Παναγιώτα)

=== Similar names ===
- Valeria / Violeta
- Daphne / Danae

=== Other matching names ===
- Vasiliki / Emmelia
- Vasilia / Emmelia

== Examples of family names ==
=== Common prefixes ===
- Chondro-: meaning "fat".
- Gero-: meaning "old" or "wise".
- Hadji-: the Arabic honorific for one who has made the Hadj or pilgrimage, used in the case of Christians for a voyage to Jerusalem, for example "Hatzipanagis".
- Kara-: from the Turkish word for "black", for example "Karatasos". In Ottoman Turkish, "kara" also meant "brave", though this sense of the word has disappeared in the modern language.
- Konto-: meaning "short".
- Makro-: meaning "tall" or "long".
- Mastro-: meaning "artisan" or "workman".
- Palaio-: meaning "old" or "wise".
- Papa-: indicating descent from a papas, a priest. So Papakostas is the "son of Kostas, the priest".

=== Common suffixes ===
- -akis (-άκης): diminutive suffix associated with Crete. A surname such as Michalakis would mean "little Michalis", "young Michalis" or "son of Michalis". Examples are: "Mitsotakis", "Theodorakis" and "Androulakis". This suffix was also very common for Cretan Turks up until they were officially changed with the Surname Law. The suffix was introduced in the 19th century.
- -akos (-άκος): associated with Laconia, particularly Maniots from the Laconian part of the Mani peninsula. Examples are: "Xarhakos", "Antonakos" and "Polymenakos".
- -eas (-έας): associated with Maniots from the Messinian part of the Mani peninsula. Examples are: "Koteas", "Georgeas" and "Michaleas".
- -opoulos (-όπουλος): meaning "descendant of", originated from the Peloponnese but has become very widespread. Examples are: "Stamatelopoulos", "Papadopoulos" and "Anagnostopoulos". It can also be coined using ethnonyms, such as Frangopoulos (Φραγκόπουλος) meaning "son of a Frank", or Voulgaropoulos (Βουλγαρόπουλος) meaning "son of a Bulgarian".
- -oulis (-ούλης): mainly from Thessaly, it is a diminutive, which is also used as a diminutive for place names in the region such as Giannouli and Damasouli . Examples are: "Georgoulis", "Giannoulis" and "Spanoulis".
- -as (-ας): names with two syllables ending in -as are associated with Epirus. Examples are: "Melas", "Dimas" and "Zappas".
- -atos (-άτος): from Kefalonia, of Venetian derivation. Examples are: "Marinatos", "Cosmatos" and "Laskaratos".
- -ellis (-έλλης): associated with the island of Lesbos, possibly of Italian derivation. Examples are: "Kanellis" and "Alepoudellis".
- -ousis (-ούσης): the suffix -ousis (often transliterated as -oussis in English) is associated with the island of Chios. Examples are: "Angelicoussis" and "Merousis".
- -oudis (-ούδης): associated with Thrace. Examples are: "Alexoudis" and "Barboudis".
- -idis or -ides and -iadis or iades (-ίδης/-ιάδης): meaning 'son of' or 'descendant of'. The suffix -idis (often transliterated as -ides in English and French) is the oldest in use. Zeus, for example, was also referred to as Cronides ("son of Cronus"). -idis was the most common suffix in Byzantium, Bithynia and Byzantine Thrace, and was extensively used by Pontic Greeks and Caucasus Greeks in the Pontic Alps, northeast Anatolia, Georgia, the former Kars Oblast, and sometimes in Epirus, Corfu and some Aegean islands. Since the 1923 Population exchange between Greece and Turkey, it has become prevalent in areas where large numbers of Pontic refugees settled, particularly Macedonia, Western Thrace and the Athens metropolitan area. Examples are: "Stavridis", "Athanasiadis" and "Kastanidis".
- -itis, -iotis (-ίτης, -ιώτης): meaning "of" or "from" a place. Examples are: "Politis" from polis (meaning city, usually referring to Constantinople, which in Greek is simply known as "the city") and "Chiotis" from Chios.
- -lis (-λής): Turkish suffix for "of" or "from" a place, like the Greek suffixes -itis and -iotis. Examples are: "Karamanlis" and "Kasdaglis".
- -oglou (-όγλου): from the Turkish -oğlu meaning "son of", generally associated with Greeks from Asia Minor. Examples are: "Tsolakoglou", "Ardizoglou" and "Patsatzoglou".
- -ou (-ου): a genitive mainly from Cyprus. Examples are: "Afxentiou", "Konstantinou" and "Georgiou".
- -tzis (-τζής): suffix to signify a profession derived from the Turkish suffix -cı/-ci/-cu, like the English -er in Baker or Butcher. Examples are: "Arabatzis" (from the Turkish arabacı meaning "cart driver") and "Kouyioumtzis" (from the Turkish kuyumcu meaning "jeweller").
- -ois (-όης, -ώης): mostly found in Aetolia-Acarnania. Examples are: "Kois", "Lois" and "Zois".
- -e (-ε): many are dating back to the Frankokratia and are of Romance etymology. Examples are: "Portosalte" and "Negroponte".

== See also ==
- Onomastics
- Ancient Greek personal names
