= Kairi (name) =

Kairi is a unisex given name and family name.

== Given name ==
- Kairi (gamer) (born 2005), Filipino professional esports player
- Kairi Harayama (原山 海里; born 1997), Japanese footballer
- Kairi Himanen (born 1992), Estonian footballer
- Kairi Jo (城 桧吏; born 2006), Japanese male actor and singer
- Kairi Kochi (高智 海吏; born 1985), Japanese handball player
- Kairi Look (born 1983), Estonian children's author
- Kairi Netsuke (根附 海龍; born 2003), Japanese skateboarder
- Kairi Sane (カイリ・セイン; born 1988), Japanese professional wrestler and actress
- Kairi Shimada (島田 海吏; born 1996), Japanese professional baseball outfielder
- Kairi Yagi (八木 海莉; born 2002), Japanese singer-songwriter

== Surname ==
- Evanthia Kairi (1799–1866), Greek playwright, poet and feminist
