= Vasilko =

Vasilko is a Ruthenian variation of the Greek name Vassilios, English: Basil). Notable people with the name include:

- Prince Vasilko Romanovich (1203–1269)
- Prince Vasilko Rostislavich (c. 1066–1124)
- Prince Vasilko Konstantinovich (1209–1238)
