= Lambrou =

Lambrou or Lamprou (Greek: Λάμπρου) is a Greek surname derived from the given name Lambros. It may refer to:

- Andrew Lambrou (born 1998), Australian singer
- Andrew Lambrou Charalambous (born 1967), British entrepreneur, philanthropist and environmentalist
- Angelos Lambrou (1912–1992), Greek sprint runner
- Ioannis Lambrou (1921–1998), Greek Olympic high jumper and basketball player
- Lambros Lambrou (footballer) (born 1977), Cypriot association football defender
- Lambros Lambrou (skier) (born 1957), Cypriot Olympic alpine skier
- Lazaros Lamprou (born 1997), Greek association football winger
- Kostas Lamprou (born 1991), Greek association football goalkeeper
- Maria Lambrou (born 1953), Cypriot Olympic long jumper
- Nick Lambrou (born 1983), American music video director and editor
- Robert Lambrou (born 1967), German politician
- Stathis Lamprou (born 1998), Greek association football midfielder
