= Chrysa =

Chrysa may refer to:

- Chrysa (Xanthi), a quarter of Xanthi, Greece
- Chrysa Spiliotis (1956–2018), Greek stage and television actress, playwright and radio presenter
- Chrysa, a character in Néron, a grand opera by Anton Rubinstein that premiered in 1879

== See also ==
- Chryssa (1933–2013), Greek-American artist
- Dittaino (Latin: Chrysas), a river in Sicily
- Battle of Chrysas, fought in 392 BC near the river
- Chryse (placename), any of the ancient places also called Chryse
