= Alexoudis =

Alexoudis (Greek: Αλεξούδης) is a Greek surname. Notable people with the surname include:

- Alexis Alexoudis (born 1972), Greek footballer
- Kaloudis Alexoudis (born 1961), Greek volleyball player
