= Clearchus =

The name Clearchus or Clearch may refer to:

- Clearchus of Athens, Greek comic poet of unknown date
- Clearchus of Heraclea (c. 401 BCE – 353 BCE), Greek tyrant of Heraclea Pontica
- Clearchus of Rhegium (fl. 5th century BCE), Greek sculptor, pupil of Eucheirus, teacher of Pythagoras the sculptor
- Clearchus of Soli (4th–3rd century BCE), Greek author and philosopher, pupil of Aristotle
- Clearchus of Sparta (c. 450 BCE – 401 BCE), Greek general, son of Rhampias
- Clearchus (consul 384), Roman consul in 384 CE
