= Kairi Look =

Estonian writer

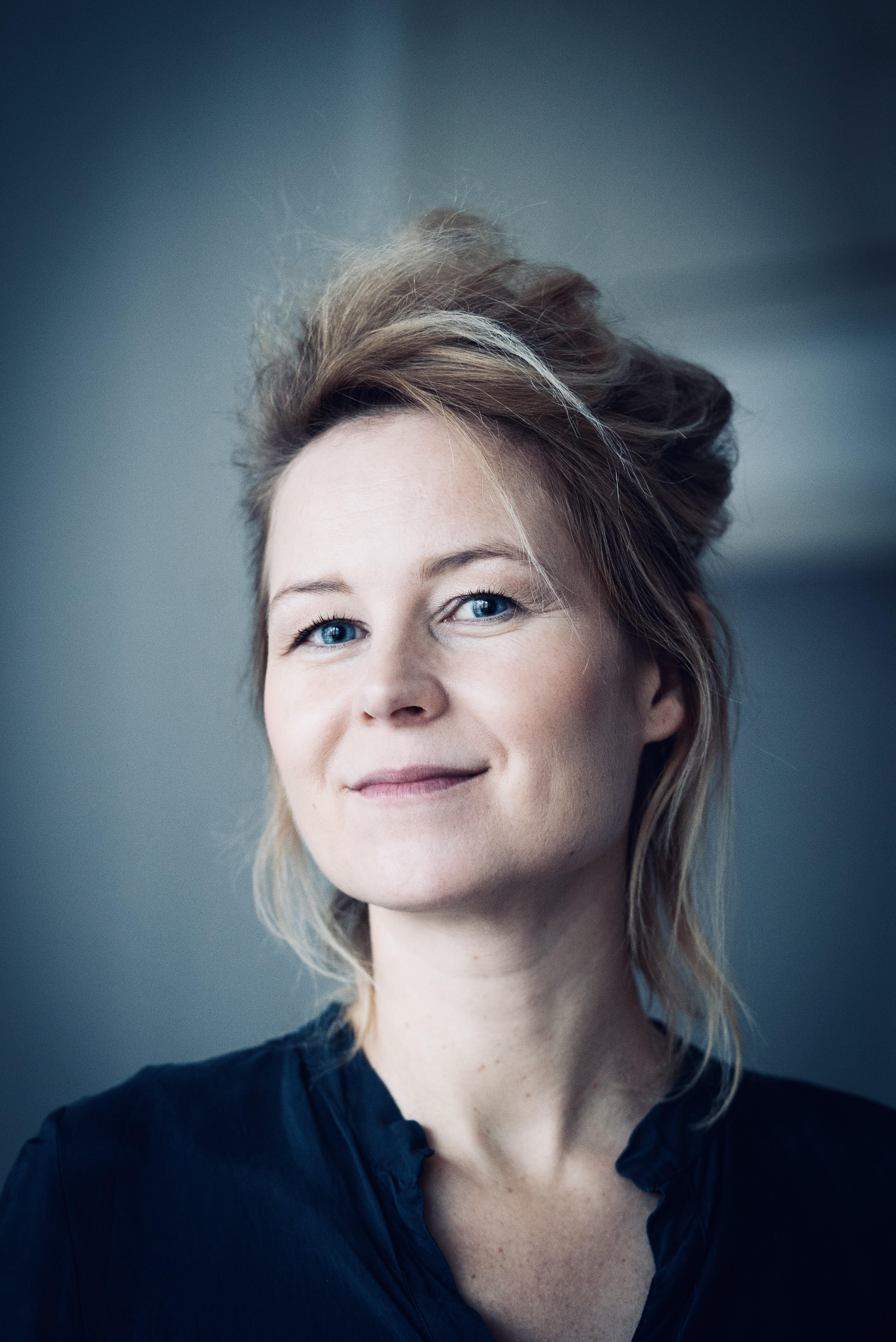
- Look in 2024. Photo by Diana Tamane
- Born: 19 April 1983 (age 43); Tallinn, Estonia
- Occupation: Author
- Years active: 2012–present

Kairi Look (born 19 April 1983) is an Estonian writer.

== Biography ==
Kairi Look graduated in 2005 University of Tartu with a bachelor's degree in physiotherapy, and in 2008 with a master's degree in human movement sciences and rehabilitative medicine from the Vrije Universiteit Amsterdam, Netherlands. She has studied in the same field in Finland and the University of Ghent, in Belgium. She has worked as a publisher of scientific literature in Amsterdam and Paris. She writes children´s literature, prose, book critique, and translates fiction from Dutch to Estonian. She has received the annual prize of the literary magazine Looming for the best novella (Relapse, Looming nr 12/2017). Her children's books have been translated to more than 10 languages and received several prizes. She is the author of Aabits, a new Alphabet book and several Estonian language study books for the primary school, published by Koolibri.

In 2025, her debut novel "Dance the Dust from the Floor" was published at Loomingu Raamatukogu for which she received the Writer of the Year 2025 award and two Best Novel of the Year prizes from Estonian bookstore chains Rahva Raamat and Apollo. It was nominated for 5 more prizes, including Natural Culture Award, Tammsaare Literary Award and Culture Endowment of Estonia Annual Prose Award. The novel was one of the most talked-about literary events of 2025 in Estonia.

== Bibliography ==
Prose

- Tantsi tolm põrandast (Dance the Dust From the Floor), Loomingu Raamatukogu 2025, Varrak 2025 (novel)

Children´s books

- Leemuripoeg Ville teeb sääred (Ville the Lemur Flies the Coop), Tänapäev 2012
- Peeter, sõpradele Peetrike (Peter – “Pete” to his Friends), Tänapäev 2014; Koolibri 2022
- Lennujaama lutikad ei anna alla (The Airport Bugs Fight On), Tänapäev 2014, 2017
- Piia Präänik kolib sisse (Piia Biscuit Moves In), Tänapäev, 2015; Koolibri 2022
- Sasipäiste printsesside saar (The Isle of Messy-Haired Princesses), Päike ja Pilv 2016
- Härra Klaasi pöörane muuseum (The Kooky Museum of Mr. Glass), Tallinna Keskraamatukogu 2016
- Piia Präänik ja bandiidid (Piia Biscuit and the Bandits), Tänapäev, 2019
- Piia Präänik ja sõnasööbik (Piia Biscuit and the Word-Snatcher), Koolibri, 2021
- Kiludisko (Herring Disco), Puänt, 2023
- Natuke suur (A Little Bit Big), Koolibri, 2024

Textbooks

- Aabits. Sõnasööbiku jälgedel (Alphabet Book. On the Tracks of the Word-Snatcher), Koolibri, 2024
- Eesti keele õpik 1. klassile. Sõnasööbiku jälgedel (Estonian language coursebook, 1st grade), Koolibri, 2025
- Eesti keele õpik 2. klassile. Sõnasööbiku jälgedel (Estonian language coursebook, 2nd grade), Koolibri, 2025
- Eesti keele õpik 3. klassile. Sõnasööbiku jälgedel (Estonian language coursebook, 3rd grade), Koolibri, 2026

Anthologies

- Eesti Novell 2020, Eesti Jutt MTÜ
- Neue Nordische Novellen VII, Heiner Labonde Verlag 2021
- The Baltic Literary Review: No More Amber 1/2021
- 12 Estonian Novels. Selected Excerpts. Estonian Literature Centre, 2025

== Translations ==
Dance the Dust From the Floor

- Dutch: Dans het stof uit de vloer, Prometheus 2026

A Little Bit Big

- Lithuanian: Truputį didelis, Misteris Pinkmanas 2024
- Latvian: Mazlietiņ liels, Liels un mazs 2025
- Italian: Tigrotto grande, ma solo un po, Bohem Press Italia, 2026
- Arabic: أريد أن أكبر قليلد, Logha دار لغة للنشر والتوزيع, 2026
- German: Ein kleines bisschen Groß, Mixtvision, 2026

The Airport Bugs Fight On

- French: Les punaises de l’aéroport font de la résistance, Le Verger des Hespérides 2019
- Finnish: Lentokentän lutikat, Aviador 2018
- Latvian: Lidostas blaktis nepadodas, Pētergailis 2019
- Russian: Клопиная книга. Обитатели аэропорта не сдаются, КПД 2019

Piia Biscuit Moves In

- Finnish: Piia Pikkuleipä muuttaa, Aviador 2019
- Russian: Пийа Пряник переезжает, Koolibri 2023
- Polish: Piia Pierniczek się wprowadza, Widnokrąg 2023
- German: Pia Pfefferminz zieht ein, Mixtvision 2025

Piia Biscuit and the Bandits

- Latvian: Pija Prjaņika un bandīti, Pētergailis 2020
- Polish: Piia Pierniczek i bandyci, Widnokrąg 2026

Piia Biscuit and the Word-Snatcher

- Latvian: Pija Prjaņika un Vārdēdis, Petergailis 2022

Peter, Petey for friends

- Russian: Пеэтер, для друзей Пеэтрике, Koolibri 2023

Ville the Lemur Flies the Coop

- Lithuanian: Lemūriukas Vilius iškeliauja, BaltArt 2019
- German: Ville macht sich auf die Socken, BaltArt 2013°

== As a translator ==
- "Milla ja mere lapsed", Eesti Raamat, 2022 (from Dutch, "Lampje" by Annet Schaap, Querido, 2017)
- "Kriimik", Eesti Raamat, 2022 (from Dutch, "Floddertje" by Annie M.G. Schmidt, Querido, 1973)
- "Mis juhtus Leoga?", Draakon ja Kuu, 2024 (from Dutch, "Dat met Leo" by Stefan Boonen & Melvin, De Eenhoorn, 2020)
- "Maailma novell", Eesti Jutt MTÜ, 2024 (from Dutch, "Poep" by Manon Uphoff, Querido, 2020)

== Awards ==
- 2012 Children's Story Competition "My First Book", 3rd place (Ville the Lemur Flies the Coop)
- 2014 Children's Story Competition "My First Book", 1st place (The Airport Bugs Fight On)
- 2014 Good Children’s Book (The Airport Bugs Fight On)
- 2015 Good Children’s Book (Piia Biscuit Moves In)
- 2015 Tartu Prize for Children’s Literature (Childhood Prize) (Peter – “Pete” to his Friends)
- 2018 Looming magazine annual prize for the best short story (Relapse, Looming nr 12/2017)
- 2022 National Writer's Stipend (2023-2025)
- 2024 5 Best-Designed Estonian Children’s Books Award (Herring Disco)
- 2024 Good Children's Book (Herring Disco)
- 2025 25 Best-Designed Estonian Books Award (A Little Bit Big)
- 2025 Good Children’s Book (A Little Bit Big)
- 2025 Bologna BRAW „Amazing Bookshelf” (A Little Bit Big)
- 2025 The most beautiful Estonian book in the Baltics (A Little Bit Big)
- 2025 Estonian Writer 2025 (Dance the Dust From the Floor)
- 2025 Book of the Year, best novel from an Estonian author (Dance the Dust From the Floor)
- 2026 Apollo bookstore chain favourite novel (Dance the Dust From the Floor)

=== Nominations ===
- 2014 – Culture Endowment of Estonia Annual Children's Literature Award (Airport bedbugs fight on)
- 2015 – Culture Endowment of Estonia Annual Children's Literature Award (Piia Biscuit moves in)
- 2017 - Tartu Children's literature Award (The Kooky Museum of Mr Glass)
- 2019 – Culture Endowment of Estonia Annual Children's Literature Award (Piia Biscuit and the bandits)
- 2020 - Tartu Children's Literature Award (Piia Biscuit and the bandits)
- 2022 – Book of the Year, best Estonian children's book (Piia Biscuit and the Letter Snatcher)
- 2022 – Book of the Year, best translated children's book (Lampje by Annet Schaap)
- 2022 – Babel Tower translation award (Lampje by Annet Schaap)
- 2023 – Book of the Year, best Estonian children's book (Herring Disco)
- 2024 – Babel Tower translation award (Dat met Leo by Stefan Boonen)
- 2025 – Culture Endowment of Estonia Annual Children's Literature Award (A Little Bit Big)
- 2026 – A.H. Tammsaare Literary Award (Dance the Dust From the Floor)
- 2026 – Eduard Vilde Literary Award (Dance the Dust From the Floor)
- 2026 – National Culture Award (Dance the Dust From the Floor)
- 2026 – Culture Endowment of Estonia Annual Prose Award (Dance the Dust From the Floor)
- 2026 – Women's Literature Award (Dance the Dust From the Floor)
