= Vasileia (given name) =

Vasileia (Greek: Βασιλεία) is a Greek feminine given name that may refer to the following notable people:

- Vasileia (diminutive) Sileia
- Vasileia Karachaliou (born 1996), Greek laser radial sailor
- Vasileia Mavrelou (born 1985), Greek water polo player
- Vasileia Zachou (born 1994), Greek group rhythmic gymnast
