= Nectarios =

Given name

- Pronunciation: Greek: [nek'tarios̠])
- Gender: Male

Origin
- Meaning: "Of nectar"
- Region of origin: Greece

Other names
- Related names: Nektary, Nectaria, Nektaria

Nectarios, Nektarios or Nectarius (Greek: Νεκτάριος) is a Greek male given name encountered in Greece and Cyprus. It means "of nectar". Although its etymology refers to the word νέκταρ (néktar, an ancient Greek word meaning "overcoming death", a honey miraculous beverage of Olympian Gods), the name Nectarios was never used in ancient Greece. It can be first seen no later than 300 AD as a Christian name, mainly of monks and bishops, in 20th century it became renowned in the Orthodox world by the lives of Saint Nectarios of Aegina and Venerable Nectarios of Optina.

A Greek diminutive form of this name is Nektary. The feminine version of this name is Nectaria or Nektaria.

== In the Orthodox Christian Church ==
- St. Nectarios of Aegina (1846–1920), Metropolitan of Pentapolis, beloved saint and spiritual father of Modern Greece.
- St. Nectarius of Optina (ca. 1854–1928), one of the last elder and spiritual father of Optina Monastery before the revolution of 1917, well known and beloved in Russia, and also abroad after Russian emigration.
- St. Nectarius of Auvergne (Nectaire, Nectarius of Limagne) (d. ~300 AD), martyr at Auvergne
- St. Nectarius of Constantinople (d. 398), Archbishop of Constantinople
- St. Nectarius of Jerusalem (1605–1680), Patriarch of Jerusalem
- Nectarius of Autun, bishop of Autun (ca. 550 AD)
- Nectarius of Vienne, bishop of Vienne (ca. 445 AD)
- Nectarius of Digne, bishop of Digne, 5th century
- Father Nectarios Yangson, Guardian of the Wonderworking Iveron Icon, and beloved spiritual guide in America.

== Other ==
- Nektarios Alexandrou, a Cypriot footballer, midfielder of the APOEL club and the Cyprus national team .
- Nektarios Tavernarakis, well known scientist in the fields of biology, cell biology, ageing, and neurodegeneration.
