= Diocles =

Diocles may refer to:

== People ==
- Diocles (mathematician) (c. 240 BC–c. 180 BC), Greek mathematician and geometer
- Diocles (mythology), one of the first priests of Demeter
- Diocles of Carystus (4th century BC), also known as Diocles Medicus, Greek physician
- Diocles of Cnidus (3rd or 2nd century BC), Greek philosopher who wrote a work quoted by Eusebius
- Diocles of Corinth, winner of the stadion race of the 13th Olympic Games in 728 BC
- Diocles of Magnesia (2nd or 1st century BC), Greek writer on ancient philosophers quoted many times by Diogenes Laertius
- Diocles of Megara, ancient Greek warrior from Athens
- Diocles of Messenia, winner of the stadion race of the 7th Olympic Games in 752 BC
- Diocles of Peparethus (3rd century BC), Greek historian
- Diocles of Phlius (fl. c. 400 BC), comic poet
- Diocles of Syracuse (fl. 413–408 BC), Greek lawgiver in the city-state of Syracuse
- Diocletian (244–311), Roman emperor formerly named Diocles
- Diocles (1st century BC), or Tyrannion the Younger
- Gaius Appuleius Diocles (104–after 146 AD), Roman charioteer

== Other ==
- Diocles (bug), a genus of bugs in the family Coreidae
- Diocles laser, a laser that uses Chirped pulse amplification at the University of Nebraska–Lincoln
