= Evanthia =

Evanthia is a given name. Notable people with the name include:

- Evanthia Kairi (1799–1866), Greek playwright, poet, and feminist
- Evanthia Makrygianni (born 1986), Greek synchronized swimmer
- Evanthia Maltsi (born 1978), Greek basketball player
