= Vasos =

Vasos is a given name and surname. Notable people with the name include:

- Todd Vasos, American businessman
- Vasos Dimitriadis, Cypriot footballer
- Vasos Mavrovouniotis (1797–1847), was a Montenegrin Serb general
