= Alkiviadis =

Alkiviadis is a given name.

People with the name include:

- Alkiviadis Stefanis, army officer and minister in the Greek government
- Alkiviadis Papageorgopoulos, Greek sportshooter and Olympian
- Alkiviadis Christofi, Cypriot footballer
- Alkiviadis Diamanti di Samarina, Greek political figure and Axis collaborator

== See also ==
- Alcibiades (disambiguation)
