= Vasileios =

Vasileios is a Greek word meaning "royal", or "kingly". It may refer to:

== Places ==
- Agios Vasileios, Achaea, village in the municipal unit of Rio, in Achaea, Greece
- Agios Vasileios, Corinthia, village in the municipal unit of Tenea, in Corinthia, Greece

== People ==
- Vasileios Christopoulos (born 1951), Greek writer
- Vasileios Demetis (born 1983), Greek swimmer
- Vasileios of Dryinoupolis (1858–1936), religious figure in the Greek Orthodox church in Northern Epirus
- Vasileios Polymeros (born 1976), Greek rower
- Vasileios Pliatsikas (born 1988), Greek footballer
- Vasileios Spanoulis (born 1982), Greek professional basketball player
- Vasileios Theodoridis, Greek journalist
