= Alkiviadis Papageorgopoulos =

Greek sports shooter

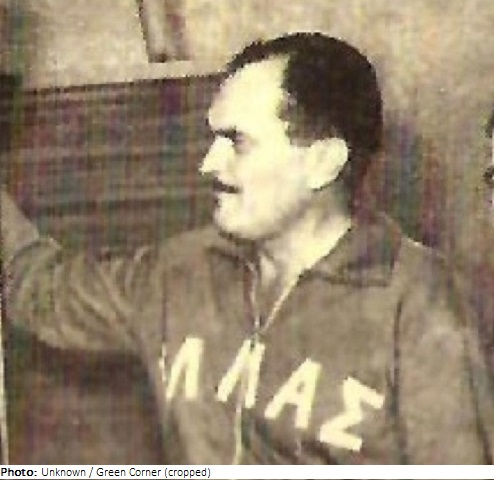

Personal information
- Nationality: Greece
- Born: 24 March 1937 Athens, Greece
- Died: June 16, 2022 Athens, Greece
- Height: 5 ft 5 in (165 cm)
- Weight: 165 lb (75 kg)

Sport
- Sport: Sports shooting

Alkiviadis Papageorgopoulos (born 24 March 1937) is a Greek former sports shooter. He competed at the 1960, 1964 and the 1968 Summer Olympics.
