= Clymene =

Clymene or Klymenê (from Greek name Κλυμένη "famous woman") may refer to:

- Clymene (mythology), the name of several figures in Greek mythology, including:
  - Clymene (wife of Iapetus)
  - Clymene (mother of Phaethon)
- Clymene (alga), a genus of red algae in the family Bangiaceae containing one described species, Clymene coleana, and two undescribed species as of 2024
- 104 Klymene, an asteroid
- Clymene dolphin (Stenella clymene), a dolphin endemic to the Atlantic Ocean
- Clymene moth (Haploa clymene), a moth of eastern North America
