= Hippolytus =

Hippolytus may refer to:

== People ==
- Hippolytus (mythology), several figures from Greek mythology, including:
  - Hippolytus of Athens, the son of Theseus
- Hippolytus of Rome (c. 170–c. 235), Christian writer and saint
- Hippolytus of Thebes (fl. 7th/8th century), Byzantine chronographer
- Hippolytus (archbishop of Gniezno) (died c. 1027)
- Hippolytus (bishop of Vác) (died after 1157), Hungarian prelate

== Literary works based on the Greek myth ==
- Hippolytus (play), a tragedy by Euripides
- Phaedra (Seneca), sometimes known as Hippolytus, play by Seneca the Younger
- A character in Jean Racine's play Phèdre

== Other ==
- Hippolytus and Aricia by Jean-Philippe Rameau
- Hippolytus a Greek non profit organisation for the preservation and cultural promotion of the Skyros Pony.
- Hippolytus, a misspelling used for Hippolyte (crustacean), a genus of shrimp
