= Neoptolemus (disambiguation) =

Neoptolemus may refer to the following people:

== People ==
- Neoptolemus, son of Achilles and Deidamia in Greek mythology
- Neoptolemus (general) (died 321), general of Alexander the Great
- Neoptolemus I of Epirus, king of Epirus, son of Alcetas I, father of Alexander I of Epirus and Olympias, grandfather of Alexander the Great
- Neoptolemus II of Epirus, king of Epirus, nephew of Alexander the Great
- Neoptolemus (Pontic army officer), general of King Mithradates Eupator
