= Callirrhoe =

Callirrhoe (/kəˈlɪroʊi/, Ancient Greek: Καλλιρρόη; also Callirhoe) may refer to:

- Callirhoe (mythology), several figures in Greek mythology, including:
  - Callirrhoe (Oceanid), daughter of Oceanus and Tethys
  - Callirrhoe (daughter of Achelous)
- Callirrhoe (Jordan), site of baths near Zareth-shahar on the eastern shore of the Dead Sea
- Callirrhoe (moon), a moon of Jupiter
- Callirhoe (novel), written by the ancient Greek author Chariton
- Callirhoe (plant), a genus of plant within the family Malvaceae
- Callirhoé, an opera by the French composer André Cardinal Destouches, first performed on December 27, 1712
- Callirhoé, the only ballet written by French composer Cécile Chaminade

== See also ==
- Calliroe, an opera by Antonio Sacchini
