= Myrtia =

Myrtia may refer to the following places in Greece:

- Myrtia, Aetolia-Acarnania, a village in Aetolia-Acarnania
- Myrtia, Euboea, a village in the island of Euboea
- Myrtia, Heraklion, a village in the Heraklion regional unit
- Myrtia, Elis, a village in Elis
- Myrtia, Laconia, a village in Laconia
