= SS Filio =

History
- Name: Njong (1944-45); Empire Garland (1945-47); Sheldrake (1947-59); Salamstar (1959-61); Ambelos (1961); Marmina (1961-68); Filio (1968-72)
- Owner: Deutsche Afrika-Linien (1944-45); Ministry of War Transport (1945-46); Ministry of Transport (1946-47); General Steam Navigation Co Ltd (1947-58); Johal Navigation Ltd, Liberia (1958-61); Johal Navigation Ltd, Greece (1961); N J Goumas (1961-68); Constantine Raikos & Filiou Raikou (1968-72)
- Operator: Deutsche Afrika-Linien (1944-45); Dundee, Perth & London Shipping Co Ltd (1945-47); General Steam Navigation Co Ltd (1947-58); Johal Navigation Ltd, Liberia (1958-60); Johal Navigation Ltd, Greece (1960-61); N J Goumas (1961-68); Constantine Raikos & Filiou Raikou (1968-72)
- Port of registry: (Nazi Germany) Hamburg, Germany (1944-45); London, United Kingdom (1945-58); Monrovia, Liberia (1958-61); Piraeus, Greece (1961-72)
- Builder: Stettiner Vulkan Werft AG
- Yard number: 28
- Launched: January 1944
- Completed: December 1944
- Out of service: 1972
- Identification: United Kingdom Official Number 180609 (1945-58); Code Letters GJLT (1945-58)
- Fate: Scrapped

General characteristics
- Class & type: Hansa A type Cargo ship
- Tonnage: 1,925 GRT, 937 NRT, 3,200 DWT
- Length: 87.66 m (287 ft 7 in)
- Beam: 13.51 m (44 ft 4 in)
- Draught: 5.59 m (18 ft 4 in)
- Depth: 4.80 m (15 ft 9 in)
- Installed power: Compound steam engine, 1,200IHP
- Propulsion: Single screw propeller
- Speed: 10.5 knots (19.4 km/h)

Filio was a Hansa A Type cargo ship which was built as Njong in 1944 by Stettiner Vulkan Werft AG, Stettin, Germany for Deutsche Afrika-Linien, Hamburg Germany. She was seized as a prize of war in 1945, passing to the Ministry of War Transport and renamed Empire Garland. She was sold in 1946 and was renamed Sheldrake. She was sold to Liberia in 1959 and renamed Salamstar. Sold to Greece in 1960 and renamed Ambelos. She was sold in 1961 and renamed Marmina. A final sale in 1968 saw her renamed Filio. She served until 1972, when she was scrapped.

== Description ==
The ship was 87.66 m (287 ft 7 in) long, with a beam of 13.51 m (44 ft 4 in). She had a depth of 4.80 m (15 ft 9 in), and a draught of 5.59 m (18 ft 4 in). She was assessed as 1,925 GRT, 937 NRT, 3,200 DWT.

The ship was propelled by a compound steam engine, which had two cylinders of 42 cm (16 9/16 in) and two cylinders of 90 cm (35 7/16 in) diameter by 90 cm (35 7/16 in) inches stroke. The engine was built by Stettiner Vulkan Werft AG. Rated at 1,200IHP, it drove a single screw propeller and could propel the ship at 10.5 knots (19.4 km/h).

== History ==
Njong was a Hansa A Type cargo ship built in 1944 as yard number 28 by Stettiner Vulkan Werft AG, Stettin, Germany for Deutsche Afrika-Linien, Hamburg, Germany. She was launched in January 1944 and completed in December. Her port of registry was Hamburg.

In May 1945, Njong was seized as a prize of war at Flensburg. She was passed to the Ministry of War Transport and was renamed Empire Garland. The Code Letters GJLT and United Kingdom Official Number 180609 were allocated. Her port of registry was London and she was operated under the management of the Dundee, Perth & London Shipping Co. Ltd.

In 1947, Empire Garland was sold to the General Steam Navigation Co. Ltd. and was renamed Sheldrake. In May 1958, a wages dispute amongst the crew whilst she was at Montreal, Canada meant that a new crew had to be flown out. Eighteen crewmen were charged with refusing to sail.

In 1958, Sheldrake was sold to Johal Navigation Ltd, Monrovia, Liberia and was renamed Salamstar. She was sold in 1961 to Johal Navigation Ltd, Piraeus, Greece and renamed Ambelos. She was sold later that year to N J Goumas, Piraeus and was renamed Marmina. She was sold to Constantine Raikos & Filiou Raikou, Piraeus in 1968 and renamed Filio. She arrived at Aspropyrgos, Greece on 15 June 1972 for scrapping by N Tzonis.
