= Archangelos =

Archangelos is a name of various towns and villages in Greece:

- Archangelos, Laconia, a village in Laconia
- Archangelos, Rhodes, a town in the island of Rhodes
- Archangelos, Preveza, a village in the regional unit of Preveza
- Archangelos, Pella, a town in the regional unit of Pella

== See also ==
- Archangel (disambiguation)
