= Frangopoulos =

Frangopoulos or Frankopoulos (Greek: Φραγκόπουλος) is a Greek epithet and later surname literally meaning "son of Frank"

- Hervé Frangopoulos (fl. 1050s), Norman mercenary general in Byzantine service
- D. Frangopoulos (fl. 1896), Greek tennis player
