= Vassilios =

Vassilios or Vassileios, also transliterated Vasileios, Vasilios, Vassilis or Vasilis (Greek: Βασίλειος or Βασίλης), is a Greek given name, the origin of Basil. In ancient/medieval/Byzantine context, it is also transliterated as Basileios. It is directly descended from the word "King", Greek: Βασιλιάς. It descends from the Greek language.

== People ==
- Vassilis Alexakis, Greek-French writer
- Vassilis Andrianopoulos, Greek footballer
- Vasilis Avlonitis, Greek actor
- Vasilis Avramidis, Greek footballer
- Vasilis Barkas, Greek footballer
- Vasilis Bolanos, ethnic Greek mayor of Himara, Albania
- Vasilios Borbokis, Greek footballer
- Vasilios Dikeakos, Regional Service Lead
- Vasilis Dimitriadis, Greek footballer
- Vasilis Fragkias, Greek basketball coach
- Vassilis Gagatsis, president of the Hellenic Football Federation
- Vasilis Georgiadis, Greek film director and actor
- Vasilis Golias, Greek footballer
- Vassilis Hatzipanagis, Greek footballer
- Vassilios Iliadis, Greek judoka
- Vasilios Kalogeracos, Australian footballer of Greek descent
- Vasili Kanidiadis, Greek-Australian television personality
- Vassilis Karapialis, Greek footballer
- Vasilis Karras, Greek folk singer
- Vasilis Katsaros, Greek footballer
- Vassilis Kikilias, Greek basketball player
- Vasilis Konstantinou, Greek footballer
- Vassilios Kotronias, Greek chess grandmaster and chess author
- Vasilios Koutsianikoulis, Greek footballer
- Vassilis Krommidas, Greek triathlete
- Vasilios Lakis, Greek footballer
- Vassilis Leventis, Greek politician and TV persona
- Vasilis Lipiridis, Greek basketball player
- Vassilis Logothetidis, Greek actor
- Vassilis Lymberis, Greek mass murderer
- Vasilios Magginas, Greek politician
- Vasilis Michaelides, Cypriot poet
- Vassilis Mitilinaios, Greek footballer
- Vasilis N. Triantafillidis, birth name of Greek comedian Harry Klynn
- Vassilis Paleokostas, Greek fugitive criminal
- Vasilis Papakonstantinou, Greek singer
- Vassilis Papazachos, Greek seismologist
- Vassilis Photopoulos, Greek painter, film director, art director and set designer
- Vasilis Politis (born 1963), Greek philosopher
- Vassilis Rapotikas, ethnic Aromanian separatist and revolutionary from Greece
- Vassilis Saleas, Greek musician
- Vassilis Simtsak, Greek basketball player
- Vassilios Skouris, 10th President of the European Court of Justice
- Vassilis Spanakis, Greek politician
- Vassilis Spanoulis, Greek basketball player
- Vassilis Steriadis, Greek poet and critic
- Vassilis Stravopodis, Greek footballer
- Vassilis Tsabropoulos, Greek musician and composer
- Vasilis Torosidis, Greek footballer
- Vasilios Tsiartas, Greek footballer
- Vassilis Tsitsanis, Greek songwriter and musician
- Vassilis Vassilikos, Greek writer and diplomat
- Vasilios Vatatzes, Greek scholar, merchant, traveler, pioneer explorer and diplomat
- Vasilis Xanthopoulos, Greek basketball player
- Vasilios Xydas, Greek pole vaulter

== Places ==
- Agios Vasileios, a Greek village in Achaea
- Agios Vasileios, a Greek village in Corinthia
- St. Vasilios Church (Massachusetts)

== See also ==
- Vassiliki (given name)
- Basil (name)
