= Merope =

Merope may refer to:

== Mythology ==
- Merope (mythology), several, probably unrelated, characters in Greek mythology

== Arts and entertainment ==
- Merope (Maffei), a 1713 play by Francesco Scipione Maffei
- Merope (play), a 1731 play by George Jeffreys
- Merope (Giacomelli), a 1734 opera by Geminiano Giacomelli with a libretto by Apostolo Zeno
- Mérope, a 1743 play by Voltaire
- Merope, an 1858 tragic poem by Matthew Arnold
- Merope Ward, a character in the 2010 two-part novel Blackout/All Clear by Connie Willis

== Plants and animals ==
- Merope tuber, a genus of Mecoptera
- Merope angulata, a species of flowering plant and the sole member of genus Merope

== Astronomy ==
- 1051 Merope, an asteroid
- Merope (star), in the constellation Taurus and a member of the Pleiades star cluster

== Places ==
- Merope (region), historical region of Thrace
