= Charilaos =

Male given name (Χαρίλαος)

Charilaos (Greek: Χαρίλαος, in Latin letters also spelled Kharilaos and Harilaos, stress on the second syllable) is a Greek language male given name.

Bearers of the name include:

- Charilaos Trikoupis (1832–1896)
- Charilaos Vasilakos (1875–1964)
- Charilaos Giannakas (19th–20th centuries)
- Charilaos Tsantis (1909–1979)
- Charilaos Mitrelias (died 1988)
- Charilaos Florakis (1914–2005)
- Charilaos Stavrakis (born 1956)
- Charilaos Pappas (born 1983)
- Charilaos Bikas (born 1992)

== See also ==
- Charis (name)
