= Voulgaropoulos =

Voulgaropoulos (Greek: Βουλγαρόπουλος) is a Greek epithet and later surname literally meaning "son of Bulgarian". Notable people with this name include:

- Stratos Voulgaropoulos, Greek professional basketball player
- Andy Boulgaropoulos (Andreas Bulgaropoulos), musician from German thrash metal band Tankard
