= Vasos Dimitriadis =

Cypriot footballer

Personal information
- Position: Midfielder

International career
Years	Team	Apps	(Gls)
1960	Cyprus	2	(0)

Vasos Dimitriadis is a Cypriot footballer. He played in two matches for the Cyprus national football team in 1960.
