= Kyriaki =

Kyriaki Κυριάκι
- Municipal unit
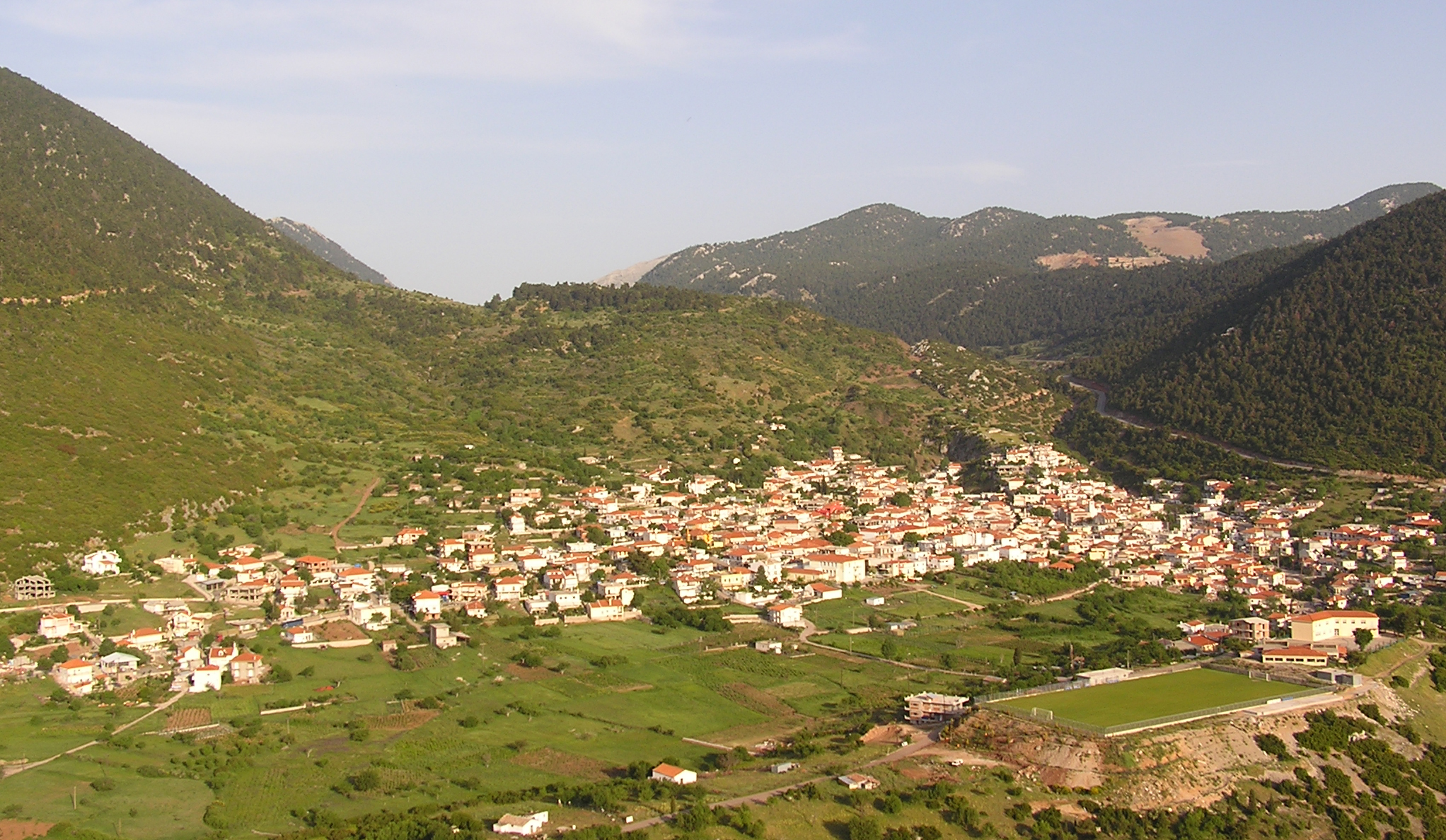
- A view of Kyriaki.

- Location within the regional unit

- Location within Greece
- Coordinates: 38°21′N 22°47′E
- Country: Greece
- Administrative region: Central Greece
- Regional unit: Boeotia
- Municipality: Livadeia

Area
  - Municipal unit: 130.36 km^{2} (50.33 sq mi)
- Highest elevation: 800 m (2,600 ft)
- Lowest elevation: 745 m (2,444 ft)

Population (2021)
  - Municipal unit: 1,804
  - Municipal unit density: 13.84/km^{2} (35.84/sq mi)
- Time zone: UTC+2 (EET)
  - Summer (DST): UTC+3 (EEST)
- Postal code: 320 06
- Area code: +30-2267
- Vehicle registration: ΒΙ

Kyriaki (Greek: Κυριάκι) is a village and a community of the Livadeia municipality, Greece. Before the 2011 local government reform Kyriaki was an independent community. The 2021 census recorded 1,804 inhabitants in the community of Kyriaki. The community of Kyriaki covers an area of 130.36 km^{2}.

== Settlements ==
- Kyriaki
- Agios Athanasios
- Karyoti
- Tarsos
- Panagia Kalamiotissa

== Population ==
Year	Village population	Community population
1981	2,320	-
1991	2,148	-
2001	2,194	2,420
2011	2,185	2,298
2021	1,709	1,804

== Geography ==
A few farmlands are around the area. The mountains that are mainly filled with grasslands and rocks covers around the area, forests are found mainly in low-lying areas. The Gulf of Corinth is approximately 5 to 6 km southwest.

== See also ==
- List of settlements in Boeotia
