= Diocles of Magnesia =

Ancient Greek writer

Diocles of Magnesia (Greek: Διοκλῆς ὁ Μάγνης) was an ancient Greek writer from Magnesia ad Sipylum, who probably lived in the 2nd or 1st century BC. The claim that he is the Diocles to whom Meleager of Gadara dedicated his anthology is questionable. He authored works entitled Ἐπιδρομὴ τῶν φιλοσόφων (Philosophers overview) and Περὶ βίων φιλοσόφων (On the lives of philosophers), both important sources for Diogenes Laërtius's work about the lives and opinions of eminent Greek philosophers, especially the Cynics and Stoics (see Diogenes Laërtius 2.82; 6.12, 13, 20, 36, 87, 91, 99, 103; 7.48, 162, 166, 179, 181; 9.61, 65; 10.12). For example, Diocles is cited by Diogenes Laertius as a source in his biography of Xenophon that would otherwise be unknown. Nothing more is known about the life and works of Diocles.
