= Nauplius =

Nauplius, Nauplia or Nauplios /ˈnɔːpliəs/, may refer to:

== Greece-related ==
- Nauplius (mythology), in Greek mythology, the son of Poseidon and Amymone, the father of Palamedes, and also the name of an Argonaut
- Nauplia, a harbor town in Greece

== Biology-related ==
- Nauplius (larva), a life stage of crustaceans
- Nauplius (plant), a genus in the family Asteraceae
- Nauplius, a genus of copepods, considered synonymous with Cyclops (genus)
- Nauplius, a genus of shrimp, considered synonymous with Alpheus (crustacean)
- Nauplius (journal), an academic journal covering carcinology

== Other ==
- 9712 Nauplius, an asteroid
