= Konstantina (given name) =

Konstantina (Κωνσταντίνα) is a female given name of Greek origin and may refer to:

- Konstantina Benteli (born 1993), Greek weightlifter
- Konstantina Katsaiti (born 1980), Greek footballer
- Konstantina Kefala (born 1977), Greek long-distance runner
- Konstantina Kouneva (born 1964), Bulgarian-Greek politician, MEP
- Konstantina Koutra (born 1979), Greek alpine skier
- Konstantina Lukes (contemporary), American politician
- Konstantina Moutos (born 1964), New Zealand fashion designer
- Konstantina M. Stankovic, otolaryngologist and physician-scientist
- Konstantina Vlachaki (born 1995), Greek volleyball player
