= Phaedon =

1767 book by Moses Mendelssohn

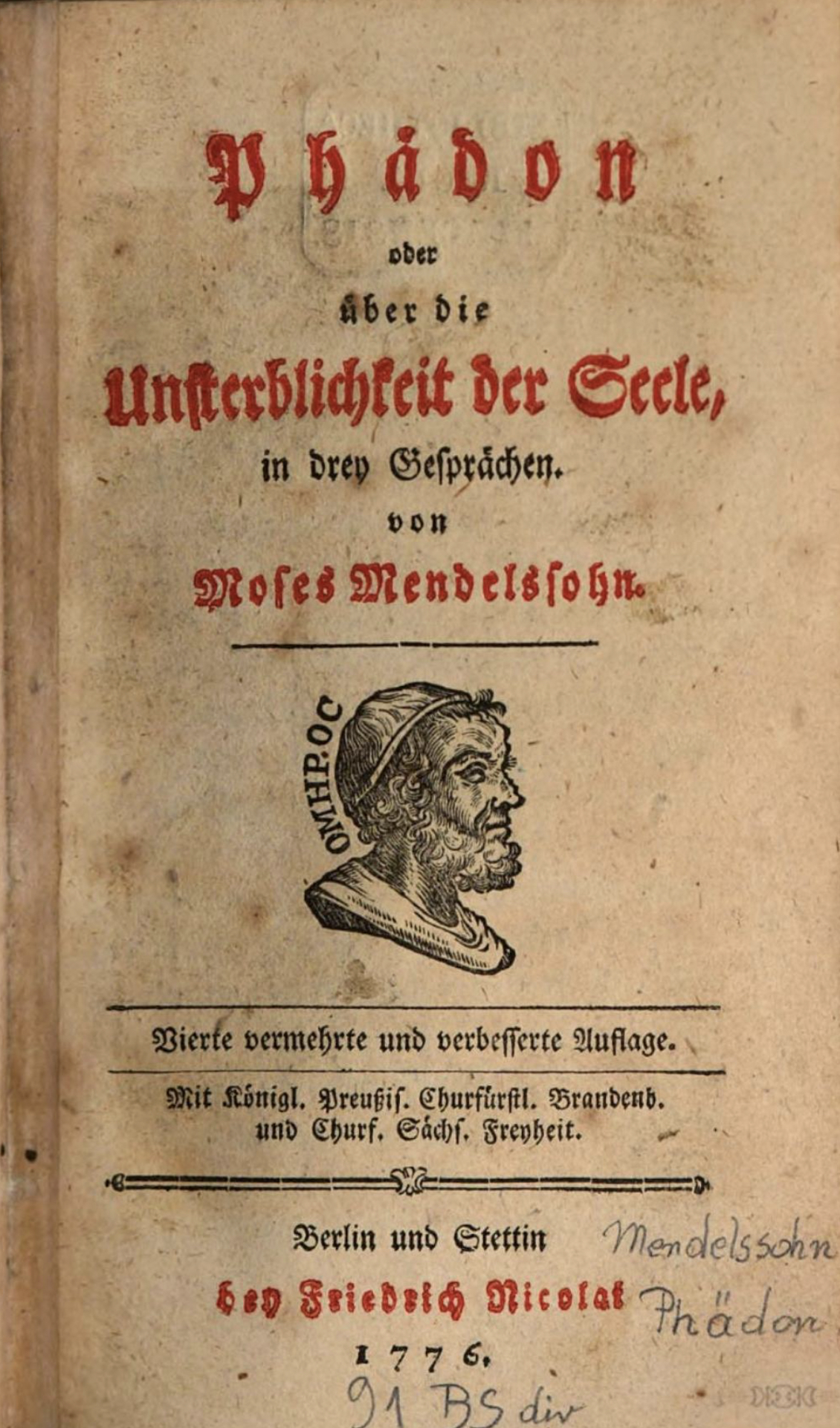
- Author: Moses Mendelssohn
- Original title: Phädon oder über die Unsterblichkeit der Seele
- Language: German
- Subject: Immortality
- Published: 1767
- Publication place: Germany
- Media type: Print
- ISBN: 978-1141640836

Phaedon (German: Phädon oder über die Unsterblichkeit der Seele), published in 1767, is a book by the Jewish Enlightenment philosopher Moses Mendelssohn, in which Mendelssohn offers a defense of immortality.

== Summary ==
Phaedon is a defense of the simplicity and immortality of the soul.

The full title of the work is Phaedon, or on the Immortality of the Soul, but is also known as Phaedon, or the Death of Socrates.

Mendelssohn wrote the book after the death of his friend Thomas Abbt. Abbt had introduced him to Plato's work, the Phaedo, and he decided to bring this work into the contemporary world. The book is dedicated to Abbt.

Phaedon is a series of three dialogues in which Socrates argues for the immortality of the soul, in preparation for his own death. He published about a third of the original text unaltered and updated the other two thirds, as well as simplifying some passages for lay readers.

Many philosophers, including Plotinus, René Descartes, and Gottfried Wilhelm Leibniz, argued that the soul is simple. They concluded that because simples cannot decompose, they must be immortal. In the Phaedon, Mendelssohn addressed gaps in earlier versions of this argument (an argument that Immanuel Kant calls the Achilles of Rationalist Psychology). The Phaedon contains an original argument for the simplicity of the soul, and also an original argument that simples cannot suddenly disappear. It contains further original arguments that the soul must retain its rational capacities as long as it exists.

== Reception ==
Materialistic views were at the time common and fashionable, and faith in immortality was at a low ebb.

Phaedon became a bestseller upon its publication, earning Mendelssohn the nickname “Berlin Socrates” and “German Plato”.

Kant criticized Mendelssohn's argument for immortality in the second edition of the Critique of Pure Reason (1787), at B413-15. Commentators disagree over whether Kant's criticism is successful.

Mendelssohn's arguments have been largely overlooked by contemporary analytic philosophers, but philosophers including Bertrand Russell and E.J. Lowe have offered arguments for the simplicity of the soul.
