= Chrysa (Xanthi) =

Quarter of the town Xanthi, Greece

Coordinates: 41°08′N 24°51′E

Chrysa (Greek: Χρύσα)(Turkish: Kileçliler) is the western quarter of the town Xanthi, in northern Greece. It was originally built as a settlement for refugees after the Greco-Turkish War (1919–1922).
