= Evangelia =

Evangelia is a Greek feminine given name. Notable people with this name include:

- Evangelia (singer), Greek-American singer
- Evangelia Atamian, (1922 – 23 February 1957), an Armenian-Greek rebetiko singer, known as Marika Ninou
- Evangelia Aravani, Greek fashion model and TV presenter
- Evangelia Chantava, Greek volleyball player
- Evangelia Chatziefraimoglou, Greek volleyball player
- Evangelia Christodoulou, Greek rhythmic gymnast
- Evangelia Micheli-Tzanakou, biomedical engineer and professor
- Evangelia Moraitidou, Greek water polo player
- Evangelia Platanioti, Greek artistic swimmer
- Evangelia Psarra, Greek archer
- Evangelia Tsagka, Greek swimmer

== See also ==
- MV E Evangelia, a ship
