= Alcaeus (disambiguation) =

Alcaeus may refer to:

== People ==
- Alcaeus of Mytilene (c. 625/620 – c. 580 BC), a Greek lyric poet
- Alcaeus (comic poet) (fl. 388 BC), a Greek Old Comedy poet
- Alcaeus of Messene (late 3rd/early 2nd century BC), a Greek epigrammatist
- Alcaeus and Philiscus (fl. 2nd-century BC), two Epicurean philosophers expelled from Rome in either 173 BC or 154 BC

== Other ==
- Alcaeus (bug), a genus of stink bugs in the family Pentatomidae
- Alcaeus (mythology), several figures of this name in Greek mythology
- 12607 Alcaeus, a main belt asteroid

== See also ==
- Alcaea
