= Valia =

Valia may refer to:

== Given name ==
- Valia Venitshaya, British actress of the silent era
- Valia Kakouti (born 1981), Miss Star Hellas 2004
- Valia Barak (born 1969), Peruvian journalist and television presenter
- Valia Valentinoff (1919-2006), actor and choreographer

== Other uses ==
- Valia (wasp), a genus of insects in the family Diapriidae
- Valia College, an education institute in Mumbai, India
- Walia, Indian surname
