= Zenia =

Zenia may refer to:

== People ==
- Zenia Larsson (1922–2007), Polish-Swedish writer and sculptor of Jewish descent
- Zenia Mucha (born 1957), American business executive with The Walt Disney Company
- Zenia Stampe (born 1979), Danish politician
- Zenia Tsima (born 1986), Greek former volleyball player
- Salem Zenia (born 1962), Algerian writer

== Other uses ==
- Zenia Khan, one of the five main characters of the Indian sitcom Kya Mast Hai Life
- Zenia (plant), a legume genus
- Zenia, California, United States, an unincorporated community
