= Angeliki =

Angeliki (Greek: Αγγελική), literally "angel-like", is a Greek female given name. Notable people with the name include:

- Angeliki Gremou (born 1975), Greek rower
- Angeliki Kanellopoulou (born 1965), Greek tennis player
- Angeliki Nikolopoulou (born 1991), Greek basketball player
- Angeliki Papoulia (born 1975), Greek actress
