= Stavroula =

Stavroula is a Greek given name. Notable people with the given name include:

- Stavroula Antonakou (born 1982), Greek water polo player
- Stavroula Constantinou (born 1975), Greek academic
- Stavroula Kozompoli (born 1974), Greek water polo player and Olympian
- Stavroula Mili, Greek molecular biologist
- Stavroula Samara (born 1994), Greek rhythmic gymnast and Olympian
- Stavroula Tsolakidou (born 2000), Greek chess player
- Stavroula Zygouri (born 1964), Greek freestyle wrestler
- Stavroula Balabani (born 1965), Greek academic
