= Vassiliki (given name) =

Greek female given name

Vasiliki (Greek: Βασιλική, romanized: Vasilikí), also spelled Vassiliki, is a Greek female given name. The male version of this name is Vasilios.

Notable people with the name include:

- Vasiliki Alexandri (born 1997), Austrian synchronized swimmer
- Vassiliki Anastasiadou (born 1958), Cypriot politician, government minister
- Vasiliki Angelopoulou (born 1987), Greek swimmer
- Vassiliki Arvaniti (born 1985), Greek beach volleyball player
- Vasiliki Diamantopoulou (born 1979), Greek water polo player
- Vassiliki Kalogera, Greek astrophysicist
- Vasiliki Karagiorgos (born 1983), Australian singer, songwriter and record producer known professionally as Vassy
- Vasso Karantasiou (born 1973), Greek beach volleyball player
- Vasiliki Kasapi (born 1983), Greek weightlifter
- Vasiliki Kassianidou (born 1967), Cypriot archaeologist and politician
- Vasiliki Katrivanou (born 1969), Greek psychologist and politician
- Vicky Leandros (1949), Greek singer living in Germany (born Vassiliki Papathanasiou)
- Vasiliki Papazoglou (born 1979), Greek volleyball player
- Vasiliki Plevritou (born 1998), Greek water polo player
- Vasiliki Maniou (born 1992), Greek group rhythmic gymnast
- Vasiliki Millousi (born 1984), Greek artistic gymnast
- Vicky Moscholiou (1943–2005), Greek singer (born Vasiliki Moscholiou)
- Vasiliki Moskofidou, Greek footballer
- Vasiliki Nikouli (born 1984), Greek volleyball player
- Vicky Price (born Vasiliki Kourmouzi, 1952), Greek-born British economist and civil servant
- Vasiliki Skara (born 1973), Greek handball player
- Vasiliki Soupiadou, Greek footballer for the national team
- Vassiliki Thanou-Christophilou (born 1950), Greek judge, caretaker Prime Minister of Greece in 2015
- Vasiliki Tsavdaridou (born 1980), Greek artistic gymnast
- Vasiliki Tsirogianni (born 1992), Greek beauty pageant winner
- Vassiliki Vougiouka (born 1986), Greek sabre fencer
- Vassy Kapelos (1981), Canadian political journalist

Fictional characters:

- Vasiliki, title character in 1997 Greek film Vasiliki
