= Loomingu Raamatukogu =

Estonian book series

Loomingu Raamatukogu (abbreviation LR) is an Estonian book series which is published by Perioodika under the auspices of Estonian Writers' Union. The series consists of mainly translations from foreign authors, but also original works by Estonian writers.

First book was published in 1957.

== All books ==
From 1959 to 1994, 52 books were published per year, and from 1995, 40 books are published per year. For the full list, see et:Loomingu Raamatukogus ilmunud teoste loend aastakäiguti.
