= Nephele (disambiguation) =

Nephele is the name of two figures in Greek mythology who are associated with clouds. She is either the cloud whom Zeus formed in the image of Hera to trick Ixion, or she is an oceanid – one of the nymphs who are the daughters of the Titans Oceanus and Tethys.

Nephele or Nefeli may also refer to:

- Nephele (moth), a genus of moth
- 431 Nephele, an asteroid
- "Nephele", a song by Animals as Leaders from the album The Joy of Motion, 2014
- Nefeli Chatziioannidou, Greek politician
- Nefeli Mousoura, Greek classical pianist
- Nefeli Papadakis (born 1998), American judoka

== See also ==
- Nephelae, a play by Aristophanes
