= Vasilia =

Scientific classification
- Domain: Eukaryota
- Kingdom: Animalia
- Phylum: Arthropoda
- Class: Insecta
- Order: Orthoptera
- Suborder: Ensifera
- Family: Gryllidae
- Subfamily: Landrevinae
- Tribe: Landrevini
- Genus: Vasilia; Gorochov, 1988

Genus of crickets

Vasilia is an Asian genus of crickets in the tribe Landrevini.

This genus appears to be monotypic, with the single species Vasilia vietnamensis (Gorochov, 1988).
