= Euthymia =

Euthymia may refer to:

- Euthymia (medicine), a calm mental state in psychology and psychiatry
- Euthymia (philosophy), a concept in philosophy
- Euphrosyne (mythology) or Euthymia, a Greek goddess
- Euthymia (grasshopper), a genus of grasshoppers in the subfamily Hemiacridinae
