= Dorotheus =

- Gender: Masculine
- Language: See list

Origin
- Language: Greek
- Meaning: God's gift

Other names
- Variant form: See list
- Related names: Theodore; Matthew; Božidar

Dorotheus or Dorotheos is a male given name from Greek Dōrótheos (Δωρόθεος), meaning "God's Gift", from δῶρον (dōron), "gift" + θεός (theós), "god". Its feminine counterpart is Dorothea, (Dorothy). Theodore means the same, with the root words in reverse order. The earliest form of the word δῶρον is the Mycenaean Greek do-ra, meaning "gifts", written in Linear B syllabic script; the feminine form Theodora is also attested in Linear B as 𐀳𐀃𐀈𐀨, te-o-do-ra.

== Linguistic variants ==
- Greek: Dorotheos (Δωρόθεος)
- Latin: Dorotheus
- English: Dorotheus
- Russian: Dorofei (Дорофей)
- Serbian: Dorotej (Доротеј)
- Czech: Dorota, Dora fem.

== People ==
- Dorotheos (sculptor) (5th century BC), of Argos, to whom Kresilas was pupil
- Dorotheus of Sidon (fl. 75), Hellenistic astrologer
- Dorotheus of Tyre (ca. 255 – 362), Christian presbyter and later bishop of Tyre
- St. Dorotheus (martyr), who was martyred with Gorgonius and Peter in the 4th century
- Dorotheus (poet) (fl. 4th-century), Christian poet, known for The Vision of Dorotheus.
- Dorotheus of Antioch, (c. 388 – 407), Arian Archbishop of Constantinople
- Dorotheus (jurist) (fl. 534), Byzantine jurist who helped draft the Justinian Code
- Dorotheus of Gaza (505–565), monastic father
- Pope Peter IV of Alexandria, also known as Dorotheos (ruled in 565–569)
- Dorotheus of Hilandar (fl. 1356–1382), protos of Mount Athos
- Dorotheus I of Athens, metropolitan of Athens from 1388 to 1392
- Dorotheos II of Trebizond, metropolitan of Trebizond from 1472
- Dorotheos of Ohrid, 15th-century bishop
- Dorotheus IV Ibn Al-Ahmar (d. 1611), Patriarch of Antioch from 1604 to 1611.
- Dorotheus of Mount Sinai and Raithu, Archbishop of Mount Sinai and Raithu
- Archbishop Dorotheus of Athens, Archbishop of All Greece 1956–1957
- Dorotheos of Adrianople
- Dorotheos the Younger
- Dorotheos Polykandriotis, Church of Greece
- Pseudo-Dorotheus, 3rd-century Christian writer
- Pseudo-Dorotheos of Monemvasia, 17th-century Greek chronicler
- Dorotheus (magister militum), Byzantine military leader

== See also ==
- Dorothea (disambiguation), Greek female given name
  - Dorothy, English variant
- Dorotheus (weevil), a beetle genus in the tribe Cylydrorhinini
