= Lycurgus (disambiguation) =

Lycurgus or Lykourgos (Greek: Λυκούργος) is the legendary lawgiver of ancient Sparta.

It may also refer to:

== People ==
- Lycurgus (king of Sparta) (third century BC)
- Lycurgus of Athens (fourth century BC), one of the 'ten notable orators' at Athens
- Lykourgos Logothetis (1772–1850), leader of Samos in the Greek War of Independence
- Lycurgus Johnson (1818–1876), American cotton planter and politician
- Lycurgus N. Phillips (1822–1892), American politician and judge from Maryland
- Lycurgus J. Rusk (1851–1928), American politician
- Lycurgus Conner (1909–1963), American politician
- George Lycurgus (1858–1960), Greek–American businessman and Hawaiian royalist

== Mythology ==
- Lycurgus (mythology), name of mythological characters named Lycurgus
- Lycurgus of Arcadia, king
- Lycurgus (of Nemea), son of Pheres
- Lycurgus (son of Dryas), king, opponent of Dionysus
- Lycomedes or Lycurgus, in Homer
- Lycurgus, son of Pronax
- Lycurgus, son of Heracles by Toxicrate, daughter of Thespius
- Lycurgus, a suitor of Hippodamia of Pisa

== Places ==
- Lycurgus, Iowa, United States, unincorporated community
- Lycurgus, New York, a fictional location in the novel An American Tragedy

== Other uses ==
- Lycurgus (album), a 1975 album by Peter Lang
- Lycurgus (cicada), a genus of cicadas
- Lycurgus (volleyball), volleyball club from the Netherlands
- Lycurgus Cup, a dichroidic goblet
