= Erastus =

Erastus is a masculine given name which may refer to:

Biblical figures:

- Erastus of Corinth, in the New Testament of the Bible

People:

- Erastus of Scepsis, 4th century BC student of Plato
- Erastus Newton Bates (1828–1898), American politician and Civil War brigadier general
- Erastus Flavel Beadle (1821–1894), American printer and pioneer publisher of pulp fiction
- Erastus C. Benedict (1800–1880), American lawyer and politician
- Erastus Brigham Bigelow (1814–1879), inventor of weaving machines
- Erastus Brooks (1815–1886), American newspaper editor and politician
- Erastus Corning (1794–1872), businessman and politician
- Erastus Corning 2nd (1909–1983), mayor of Albany, New York, great-grandson of the above
- Erastus Milo Cravath (1833–1900), American abolitionist, field secretary with the American Missionary Association, co-founder and president of Fisk University and founder of numerous other historically black colleges
- Erastus D. Culver (1803–1889), American anti-slavery activist, attorney, politician, judge and diplomat
- Erastus Fairbanks (1792–1864), American manufacturer and politician, a founder of the Republican Party and twice Governor of Vermont
- Erastus Salisbury Field (1805–1900), American folk art painter
- Erastus Mbumba Haitengela, Namibian politician
- Erastus Otis Haven (1820–1881), American bishop of the Methodist Episcopal Church and president of the University of Michigan and Northwestern University
- Erastus Hussey (1800–1889), American abolitionist and one of the founders of the Republican Party
- Erastus C. Knight (1857–1923), American businessman and politician
- Erastus Dow Palmer (1817–1904), American sculptor
- Erastus Root (1773–1846), American lawyer and politician
- Erastus G. Smith (1855–1937), American politician
- Erastus Snow (1818–1888), Mormon religious official
- Erastus D. Telford (1874–1936), American lawyer and politician
- Erastus J. Turner (1846–1933), American politician
- Erastus B. Tyler (1822–1891), American businessman, merchant and American Civil War Union Army officer
- Erastus Uutoni (born 1961), Namibian politician
- Erastus Wells (1823–1893), American politician and businessman
- Erastus Wentworth (1813–1886), American educator, Methodist Episcopal minister and missionary in China
- Erastus Wiman (1834–1904), Canadian journalist and businessman and a developer in the New York City borough of Staten Island
