= Olympia (given name) =

Olympia is a feminine given name. Notable people with the name include:

- Olympia Mancini, Countess of Soissons (1638–1708), second-eldest of the five celebrated Mancini sisters and mother of Austrian general Prince Eugene of Savoy
- Princess Maria-Olympia of Greece and Denmark (born 1996), Oldest child and only daughter of Pavlos, Crown Prince of Greece, and his wife, Marie-Chantal, Crown Princess of Greece.
- Olympia von und zu Arco-Zinneberg (born 1988), French princess by marriage
- Olympia Aldersey (born 1992), Australian world and Olympic champion rower
- Olympia Brown (1835–1926), American minister and suffragist
- Olympia Campbell (born 1995), British fashion model
- Olympia Dukakis (1931–2021), American actress
- Olympia Hartauer, female professional wrestler from the Gorgeous Ladies of Wrestling
- Olympia LePoint (born 1976), American author, professional speaker and rocket scientist
- Olympia Paus (born 1976), Norwegian shipping heiress and equestrienne
- Olympia Scott (born 1976), American former Women's National Basketball Association player, former college coach and entrepreneur
- Olympia Snowe (born 1947), U.S. Senator from Maine
- Olympia Ann "Olan" Sylvers (born 1951), member of the family singing group The Sylvers
- Olympia Valance (born 1993), Australian actress
