= Vasilios Katsaros =

Greek footballer

Personal information
- Full name: Vasilios Katsaros
- Date of birth: 20 October 2000 (age 26)
- Place of birth: Arta, Greece
- Height: 1.82 m (6 ft 0 in)
- Position: Left-back

Team information
- Current team: Atsalenios

Youth career
- 2006–2019: Platanias

Senior career*
Years	Team	Apps	(Gls)
2019–2021	Platanias	6	(0)
2019	→ Irodotos (loan)	13	(1)
2021–2022	Agios Nikolaos		
2022–	Atsalenios		
- * Club domestic league appearances and goals as of 6 March 2020

Vasilios Katsaros (Greek: Βασίλειος Κατσαρός; born 20 October 2000) is a Greek professional footballer who plays as a left-back.
