= Clearchus of Athens =

Athenian comic poet

Clearchus (date unknown) was an Athenian comic poet of the ancient Greek New Comedy whose works Corinthioi, Kithardos, and Pandoros Athenaeus quotes in the Deipnosophistae.
