= Staikos =

Staikos is the name of:

== Given name ==
- Staikos Vergetis (born 1976), Greek football manager
- Staikos Staikopoulos (1799–1835), Greek military officer

== Surname ==
- Konstantinos Staikos (1943–2023), Greek architect and book historian
- Michael Staikos (1946–2011), Eastern Orthodox metropolitan bishop of Austria
- Nick Staikos (born 1986), Australian politician
- Paschalis Staikos (born 1996), Greek football player
- Thanasis Staikos (born 1980), Greek football manager and player
