= Eleana =

Eleana is a feminine given name.

== People with the given name ==
- Eleana Colby, American politician
- Eleana Papaioannou, Greek pop-folk singer
- Eleana Yu (born 2004), American tennis player.

== See also ==
- Eleanor
- Yucca eleana
- Eliana
