= Antiope =

Antiope may refer to:

== Mythology ==
- Antiope (Greek myth), several figures in Greek mythology including:
  - Antiope (Amazon), daughter of Ares
  - Antiope (mother of Amphion), mother of Amphion by Zeus, associated with the mythology of Thebes, Greece
  - Antiope (daughter of Pylon), also called Antioche, a daughter of Pylon and wife of Eurytus

== Arts and literature ==
- Antiope, a fragmentary play by Euripides
- Antiope, a painting by Titian
- Antiope (character), from the fictional DC Comics universe

== Ships ==
- French submarine Antiope (Q160), a French Navy submarine in commission from 1933 to 1946
- MV Antiope, a Panamanian cargo ship in service from 1948 to 1964

== Other uses ==
- 90 Antiope, a double asteroid
- Antiope (teletext), a now-abandoned teletext system
- Antiope Reef, a coral reef northeast of Niue
