= Thomais =

Thomais may refer to:

- Thomais of Alexandria, Byzantine martyr and 5th century saint
- Thomais of Lesbos (909–913 – c. 947–951), Byzantine laywoman and saint
- Thomais Orsini (born c. 1330), queen consort of Epirus and Thessaly
- Thomaïs Emmanouilidou (born 1997), Greek rower

== See also ==
- Saint Thomas (disambiguation)
