= Stamatia =

- Gender: Female

Origin
- Region of origin: Greek

Other names
- Related names: Stamatis (masculine), Stamato (surname)

Stamatia (Greek: Σταματία) is a Greek feminine given name. Its diminutives are Stamatina, Stamatoula, Matina, Matoula, Mata and Stamato. The masculine form of the name is Stamatis.

== People ==
- Elizabeth Stamatina Fey, American comedian

== See also ==
- Stamata, a Greek community in East Attica prefecture
