= Fotini =

Fotini (Greek: Φωτεινή) is a feminine Greek given name and may refer to:

- Fotini Markopoulou-Kalamara (born 1971), Greek theoretical physicist and academic
- Fotini Pipili (born 1950), Greek journalist and politician
- Fotini Papadopoulos (born 1950), former First Lady of Cyprus
- Fofi Gennimata (1964–2021), Greek politician
- Fotini Vavatsi (born 1974), Greek archer
