= Venetia (given name) =

Venetia is a feminine English given name. It may refer to:

== People ==
- Venetia Briggs-Gonzalez, Belizean wildlife research ecologist
- Venetia Burney (1919–2009), the girl who named the planet Pluto
- Venetia Dearden (born 1975), English photographer
- Venetia James (1861–1948), London society hostess and racehorse breeder
- Venetia Scott (born 1963), British photographer and fashion stylist
- Venetia Stanley (1600–1633), Elizabethan Catholic and wife of Kenelm Digby
- Venetia Stanley (1887–1948), British aristocrat and socialite remembered for her 1910–15 correspondence with Prime Minister H. H. Asquith
- Venetia Stanley-Smith (1950–2023), British-born herbalist
- Venetia Stevenson (1938–2022), English-American actress
- Venetia Williams (born 1960), British racehorse trainer

== Fictional characters ==
- Venetia Lanyon, heroine of Georgette Heyer's Regency Romance novel Venetia
