= Vivi (name) =

Vivi is a given name and surname.

People with the name Vivi include:

- Gino Vivi (born 2000), Costa Rican footballer
- Vivi Bach (1939–2013), Danish actress and singer
- Vivi Fernandez (born 1977), Brazilian model
- Vivi Flindt (born 1943), Danish ballerina
- Vivi Friedman (1967–2012), Finnish film director
- Vivi Gioi (1917–1975), Italian actress
- Vivi Jiang (born 1988), Chinese pop singer
- Vivi Krogh (1919–2014), Norwegian anti-immigration activist
- Vivi Sylwan (1870-1961), Swedish textile historian and textile curator at the Röhsska Museum in Gothenburg.
- Vivi Zigler, American television executive
- Albert Vivancos (born 1994), commonly known as Vivi, Spanish footballer
- ViVi (born 1996), stage name of Wong Ka Hei, Hong Kong born singer based in South Korea, member of Loona, Loona 1/3, and Loossemble
