= Thomai =

Thomai and Thomais may refer to:

== People ==
=== Given name ===
- Thomai Apergi (born 1988), Greek singer
- Thomai Lefousi (born 1971), Greek alpine skier
- Thomai Vardali (born 1995), Greek soccer player
- Thomaïs Emmanouilidou (born 1997), Greek rower
- Thomais Orsini (born 1330), Greek consort
- Thomais of Lesbos (10th century), Greek saint

=== Surname ===
- Éamonn Mac Thomáis (1927–2002), Irish writer
- Themie Thomai (1945–2020), Albanian politician

== See also ==
- Thoma
- Thomas (disambiguation)
- Tomás (disambiguation)
