= Lambros =

Lambros, also spelled Lampros (Λάμπρος) is a Greek masculine first ("Christian") name and surname or family name. Lambros means "shining, bright, radiant". It is related to the nominalized adjective Lambri (Λαμπρή), meaning the Easter Sunday. As a name, it is mostly found in Cyprus, Central Greece and the Peloponnese. People bearing this first name, celebrate their Name day on Easter Sunday. The usual female form is Lambrini (Λαμπρινή).

== People ==
- Lambros Katsonis
- Lambros Choutos
- Lambros Koromilas
- Lambros Konstantaras
- Lambros D. Callimahos
- Lambros Koutsonikas
- Lambros Malafouris
- Lambros Tsoumaris
- Marina Lambrini Diamandis (MARINA)

As surname:

- Spyridon Lambros
