= Vasileia =

Vasileia: Bασίλεια (Greek); Karşıyaka (Turkish)
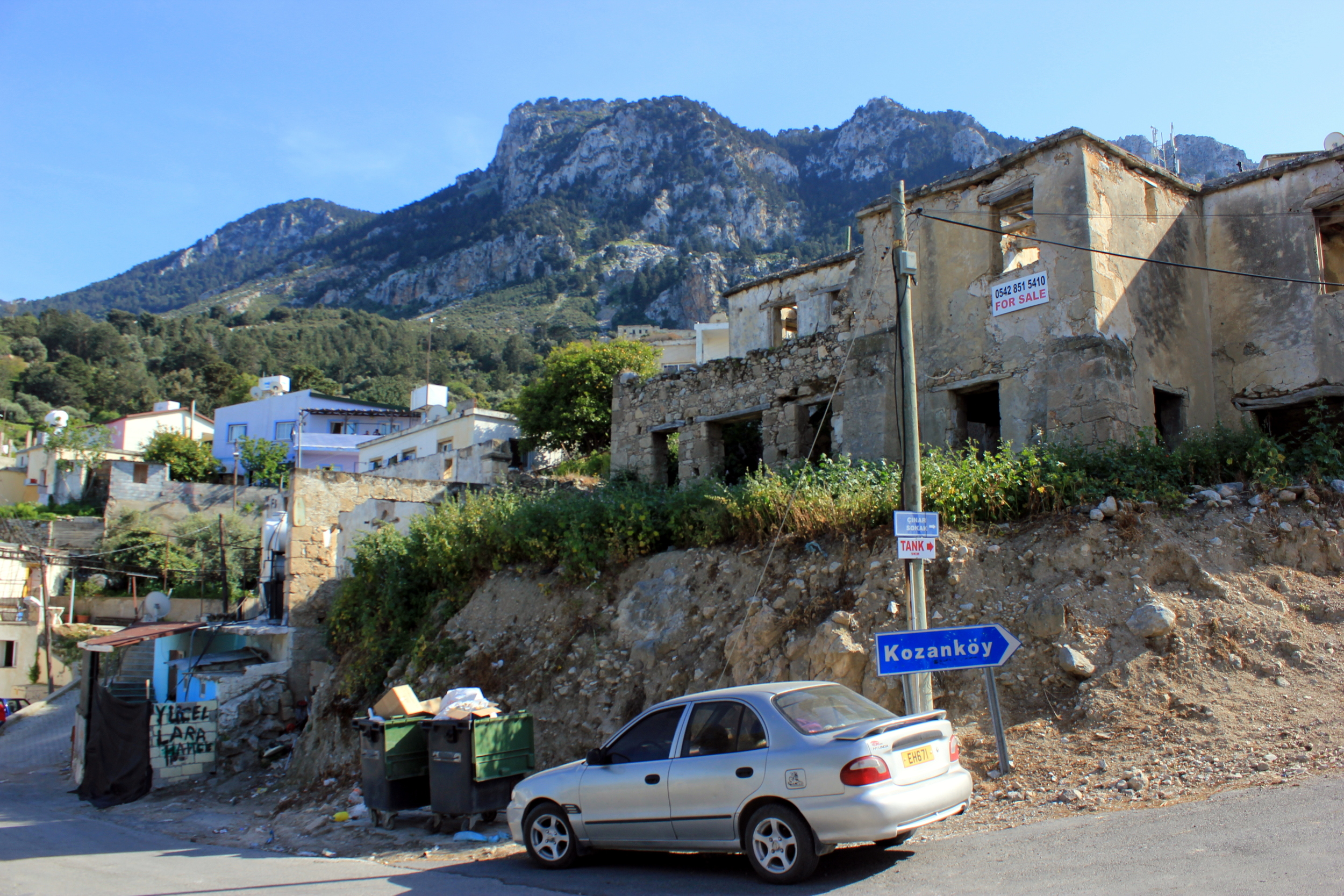
- In Vasileia

- Location in Cyprus
- Coordinates: 35°20′40″N 33°7′22″E
- Country (de jure): Cyprus
  - District: Kyrenia District
- Country (de facto): Northern Cyprus
  - District: Girne District

Population (2011)
  - Total: 2,091
- Time zone: UTC+2 (EET)
  - Summer (DST): UTC+3 (EEST)

Vasileia (Greek: Bασίλεια; Turkish: Karşıyaka) is a village in Kyrenia District of Cyprus. It is located 3 km west of Lapithos. De facto, it is under the control of Northern Cyprus. Its population in 2011 was 2,091.

In the heart of Vasileia there is an abandoned church.

== Culture, sports, and tourism ==
Turkish Cypriot Karşıyaka Sports Club was founded in 1957, and now in Cyprus Turkish Football Association (CTFA) 1. League.
