= Evanthia Kairi =

Evanthia Kairi (1799–1866) was a Greek intellectual, playwright, poet and feminist.

== Biography ==
Evanthia Kairi was born on the island of Andros in 1799, the seventh child of Asimina Kambanaki and Nikolaos Kairis. Her family moved to Kydonies in 1812 when her brother Theophilos Kairis was hired as a teacher at the town's high school. She acquired fluency in Ancient Greek, French and Italian languages and became an accomplished translator. Ambroise Firmin Didot met her at the age of 17 and later wrote: "Who could suspect, that, in this virtually unknown little town in Asia, a small, miserable house would contain a young woman with such an exceptional education."

Kairi wrote the three-act play Nikeratos, which concerns the Third Siege of Missolonghi in 1826. She wrote the play between April and July and published it anonymously in Nafplion that year. It was the first play by a Greek woman to be published. The play was staged in Ermoupolis later that year.

Kairi also wrote a short history of Greece.
