= Stavros =

Stavros may refer to:

== Places ==
=== Greece ===
- Stavros, Chania, a village and beach in Crete, Greece
- Stavros, Grevena, a town and municipality in Western Macedonia, Greece
- Stavros, Ithaca, a village on the island of Ithaca, Greece
- Stavros, Karditsa, the seat of the former municipality Kampos, Karditsa, Greece
- Stavros, Larissa, a village in Enippeas, Greece
- Stavros, Thessaloniki, a village and a community of the Volvi municipality in Greece

=== Other places ===
- Stavros Reservation, a nature reserve located in Essex, Massachusetts

== Other uses ==
- Stavros (name)
- Stavros S Niarchos, a British tall ship
- Stavros, and Stavros II, pornographic movies by Mario Salieri

== See also ==
- Stavro, a given name and surname
