= Stavros (name) =

- Gender: Masculine
- Language: Greek
- Name day: 14 September

Other gender
- Feminine: Stavroula

Origin
- Meaning: Christian cross

Other names
- Variant form: Stavriani
- Derived: σταυρóς 'The Cross'

Stavros ([ˈstavros], Greek Σταύρος) is a Greek name. It comes from σταυρóς, the Christian cross, distinguished from it by having the accent on the first syllable (cf. Christos). It was adopted as a name commemorating the feast of the Exaltation of the Holy Cross.

Unlike other names of Greek origin (Alexander, Nicholas, Peter, Stephen) that have been adopted widely, Stavros as a given name is largely confined to Greeks.

Female versions of the name are Stavroula (much more common) and Stavriani (rare).

The nominative form Stavros is not used as a surname in Greek, but is sometimes found as a shortened form of, e.g., Stavropoulos, outside of Greece. The patronymic, in the genitive form Stavrou, is commonly found as a surname.

In English, Stavros is sometimes anglicised as Steve, which actually is the English form of the Greek name Stephanos.

== Given name ==
- Stavros Arnaoutakis (born 1956), Greek and European politician
- Stavros Diamantopoulos (born 1947), Greek footballer
- Stavros Dimas (born 1941), Greek and European politician
- Stavros Ditsios (born 1978), Greek visual artist
- Stavros Foukaris (born 1975), Cypriot footballer
- Stavros Georgiou (born 1972), Greek footballer
- Stavros Giannopoulos (born 1961), Greek water polo player
- Stavros Glouftsis (born 1981), Greek footballer
- Stavros Halkias (born 1989), American comedian
- Stavros Karampelas (born 1973), Greek politician
- Stavros Katsanevas (1953–2022), Greek astroparticle physicist
- Stavros Kazantzidis, Australian writer, director and producer
- Stavros Kontonis (born 1963), Greek lawyer and politician
- Stavros Konstantinou (born 1984), Cypriot singer
- Stavros Kostopoulos (1900–1968), Greek banker and politician
- Stavros Kouyioumtzis (1932–2005), Greek music composer
- Stavros V. Kyriakides (born 1971), Cypriot businessman
- Stavros Labrakis (born 1970), Greek footballer
- Stavros Labriakos (born 1975), Greek footballer
- Stavros Lambrinidis (born 1962), Greek and EU politician
- Stavros G. Livanos (1891–1963), Greek shipping magnate
- Stavros Malas (born 1967), Cypriot politician
- Stavros Mendros, American politician
- Stavros Michaelides (born 1970), Cypriot swimmer
- Stavros Michalakakos (born 1987), Cypriot singer
- Stavros Niarchos (1909–1996), Greek shipping magnate
- Stavros Papastavrou (born 1967), Greek politician
- Stavros Paravas (1935–2008), Greek actor
- Stavros Paskaris (born 1984), American ice hockey player
- Stavros Petavrakis (born 1992, Greek footballer
- Stavros Rigas (died 1921), nom de guerre "Kapetan Kavodoros", officer of the Hellenic Army
- Stavros Sarafis (1950–2022), Greek football player
- Stavros Schizas (born 1989), Greek basketball player
- Stavros Stathakis (born 1987), Greek footballer
- Stavros Theodorakis (born 1963), Greek journalist and politician
- Stavros Thomadakis, Greek economist
- Stavros Toutziarakis (born 1987), Greek basketball player
- Stavros Tsoukalas (born 1988), Greek footballer
- Stavros Tziortziopoulos (born 1978), Greek footballer
- Stavros Tziortzis (born 1948), Cypriot former athlete
- Stavros Vasilantonopoulos (born 1992), Greek footballer
- Stavros Vavouris (1925–2008), Greek poet
- Stavros Xarchakos (born 1939), Greek composer
- Stavros Xenidis (1924–2008), Greek actor
- Stavros Zurukzoglu (1896–1966), Swiss eugenicist

== Surname ==
- Gus Stavros, (1925–2022) American entrepreneur, businessman, and philanthropist
- Jasmin Stavros (Milo Vasić, 1954–2023), Croatian pop musician

== Fictional characters ==
- Stavros, a comic character played by Harry Enfield
- General Stavros, in Command & Conquer: Red Alert
- Detective Demosthenes Stavros, a recurring character on the U.S. television series Kojak portrayed by George Savalas.
- Stavros, a demigod played by Ryan Handley, in Episode 5, season 2 of Percy Jackson and the Olympians
- Stavros Katsopolis, the swarthy doppelgänger cousin of Jesse Katsopolis in the episode Kissing Cousins from the television sitcom Full House.
- Ernst Stavro Blofeld, an antagonist in the James Bond novels and films

== Locations ==
- Stavronikita
- Stavropol
- Stavropol Krai

== See also ==
- Stavro
- Stephen
- Stavros Flatley, a British-Cypriot father–son dance duo from Britain's Got Talent
