= Gouverneto Monastery =

Greek Orthodox monastery in Crete

- Μονή Γουβερνέτου
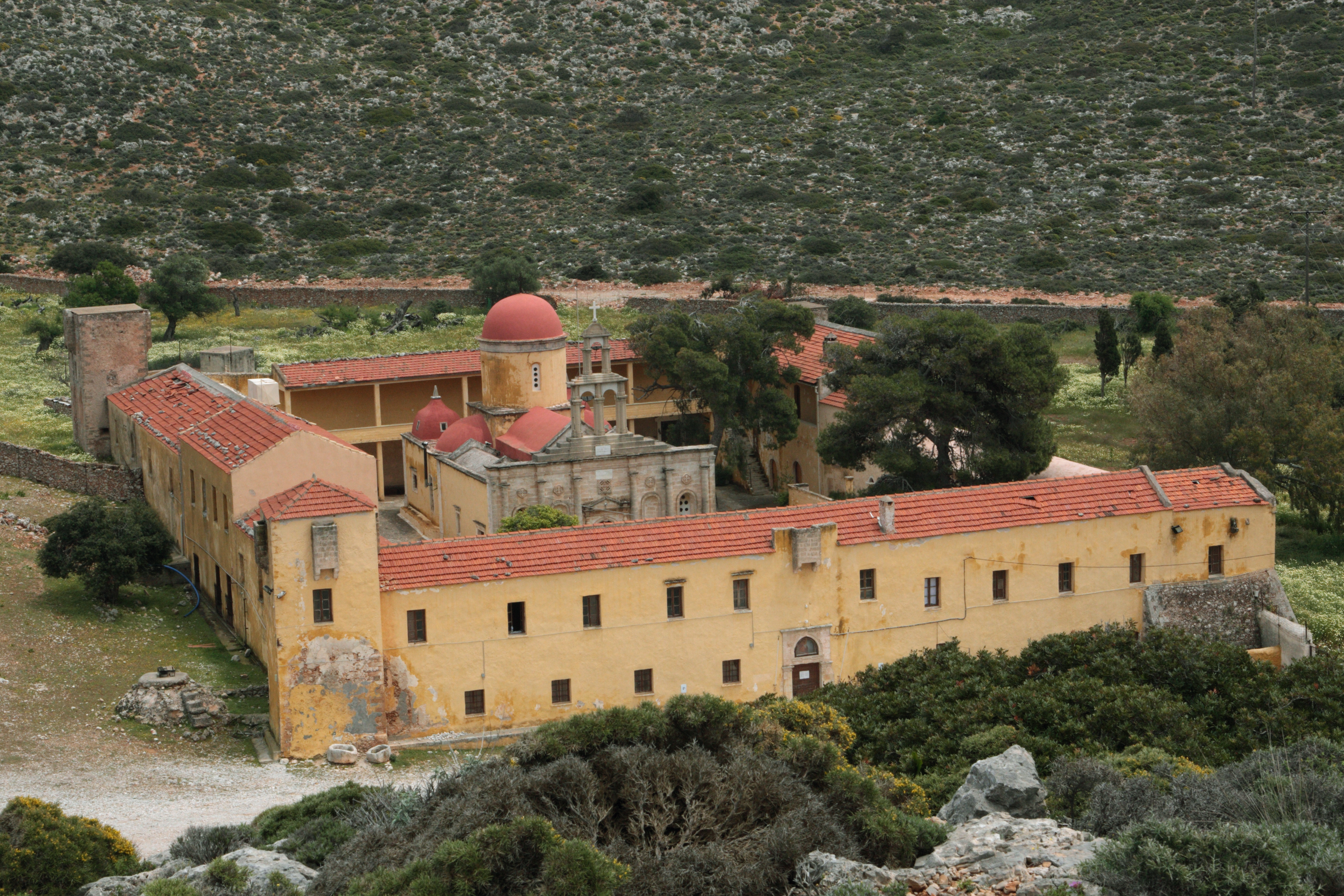

- Location of the monastery in Crete
- Interactive map of Gouverneto Monastery

Monastery information
- Order: Ecumenical Patriarchate of Constantinople
- Denomination: Greek Orthodox
- Dedication: Our Lady of the Angels
- Archdiocese: Church of Crete

Architecture
- Status: Monastery
- Functional status: Active
- Style: Venetian fortress; Baroque Revival
- Completed date: 1537

Site
- Location: Akrotiri, Chania, Crete
- Country: Greece
- Coordinates: 35°35′1″N 24°8′25″E

The Gouverneto Monastery (Greek: Μονή Γουβερνέτου), also known as Our Lady of the Angels, is a Greek Orthodox monastery on the Akrotiri peninsula of the Chania region of Crete, Greece. It is located approximately 19 kilometres (12 mi) from Chania, and is approximately 5 kilometres (3.1 mi) north of the Agia Triada Monastery.

== History ==
Completed in 1537 (although other sources say 1548), the Gouverneto Monastery is reputed to be one of the oldest monasteries in Crete. A census held in 1637, recorded shortly before the Turkish invasion, revealed that at the time there were 60 monks living there, making it one of the largest in Crete at the time.

During World War II, the Germans established a guardhouse in the monastery to control the area. Since 2005 it has undergone restoration work by the monks.

== Features ==
The monastery is a Venetian-style fortress with towers at each end, and some Baroque Revival influences added later. It measures approximately 40 by 50 metres (130 by 160 ft) and contains rooms for approximately 50 monks over two floors. The courtyard is rectangular shaped and is dominated by a dome church with an ornate Venetian façade; the church is dedicated to the Virgin Mary. The chapel in the courtyard is reported to have some of the oldest frescoes in Crete.

To the west side of the monastery is the narthex, with chapels dedicated to St. John the Hermit and the Ten Holy Martyrs. There are some notable monsters carved in relief on the front of the church. A cave called Arkouditissa or Arkoudia, is also located in the vicinity. Here the goddess Artemis was once worshiped.

The monastery is officially closed on Wednesdays and Fridays.

== See also ==
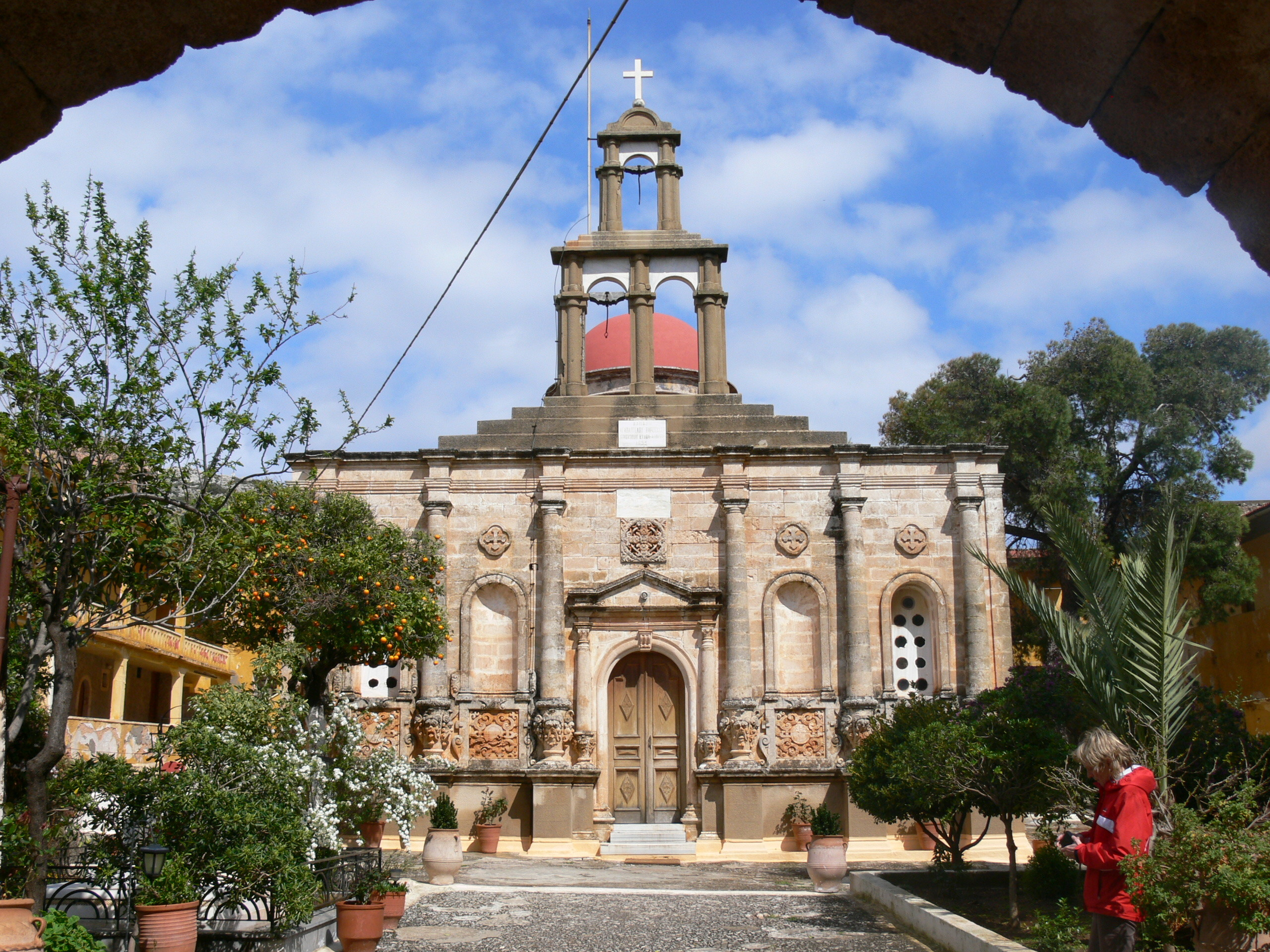
Facade of the monastery

- Church of Crete
- List of Greek Orthodox monasteries in Greece
