= Arkoudiotissa Cave =

Cave in Crete, Greece

Coordinates: 35.5889°N 24.1439°E

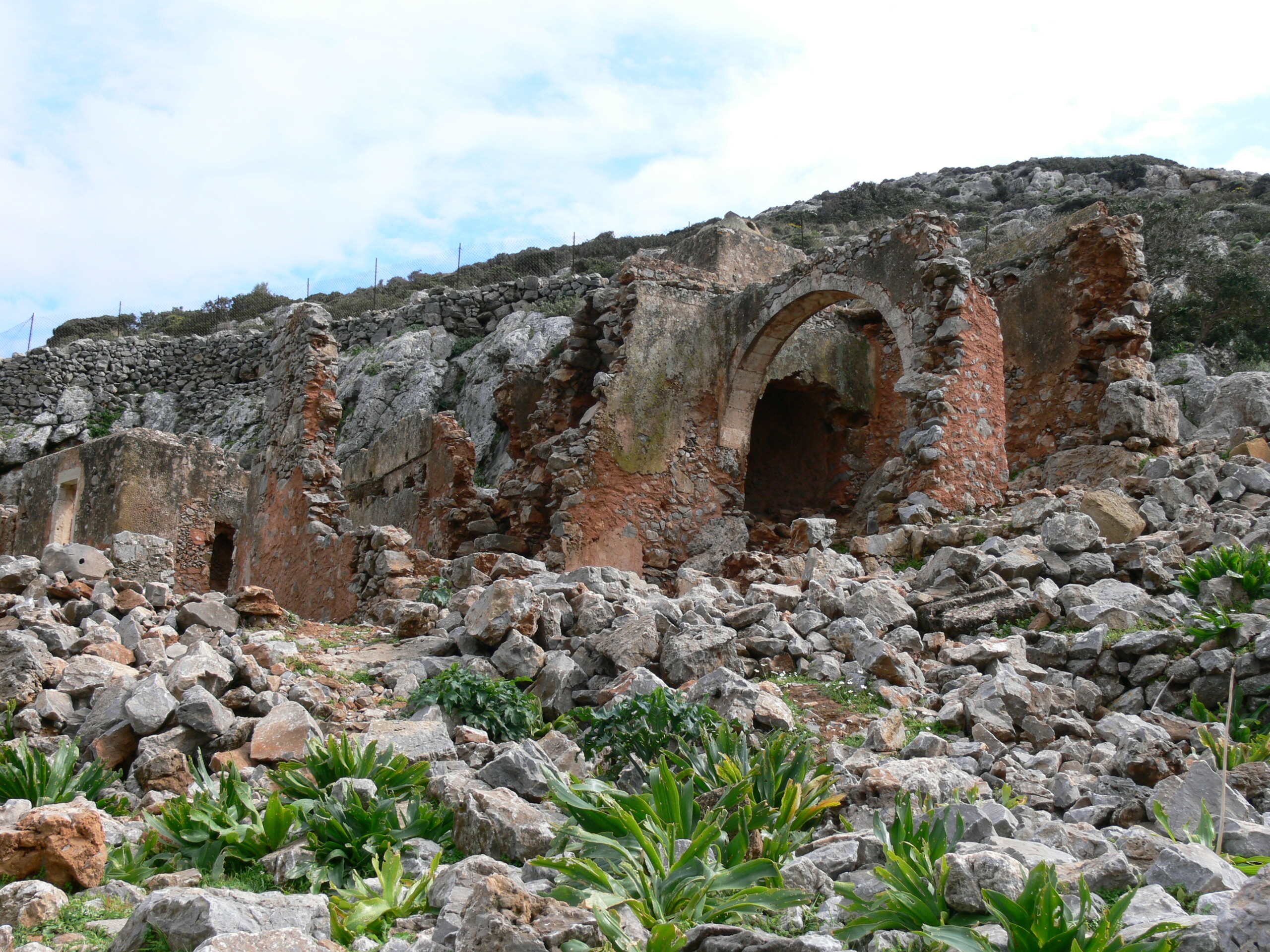

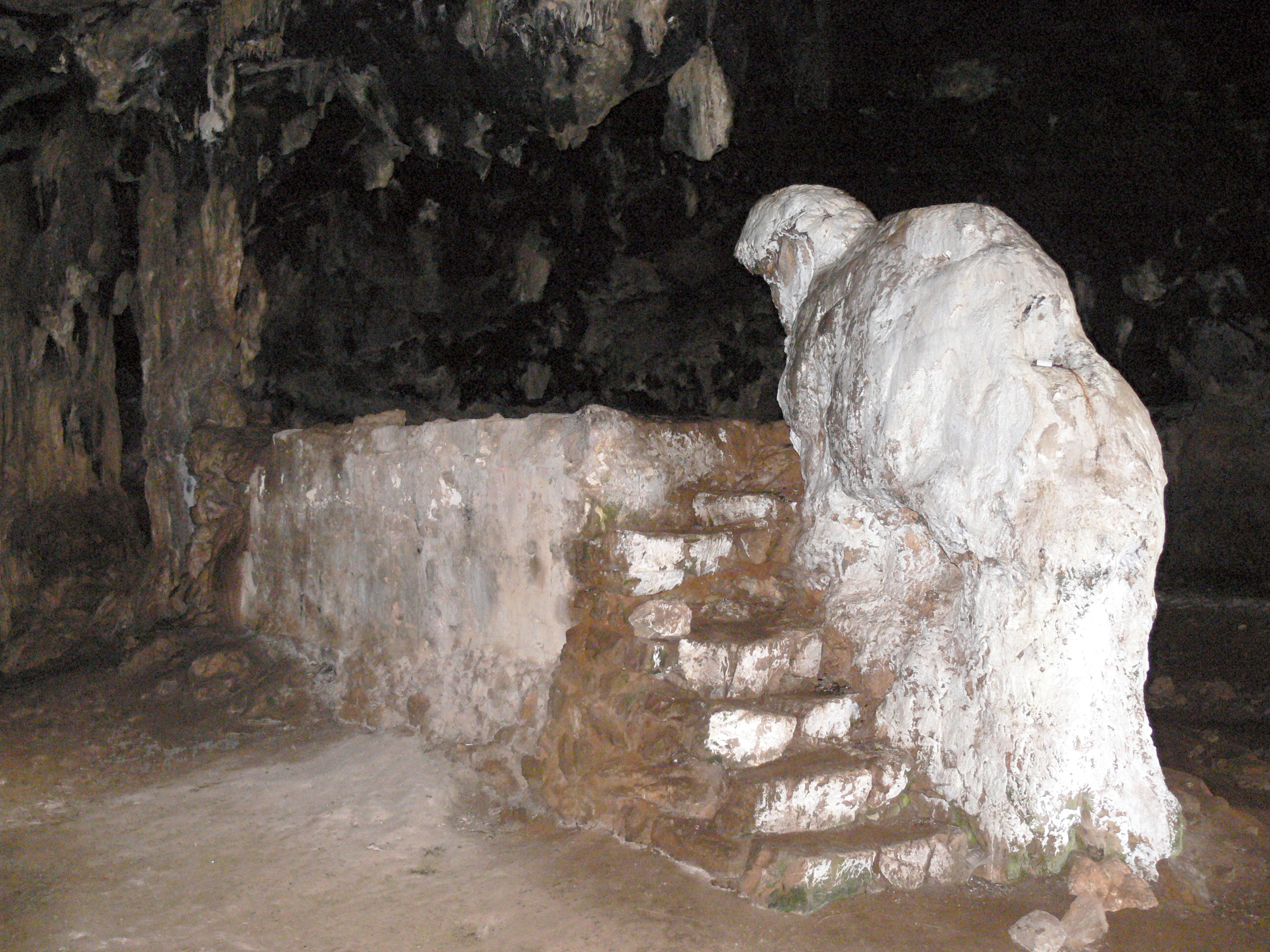

Arkoudiotissa (Greek: Αρκουδιώτισσα, [ar.kuˈðjo.ti.sa]) is a cave in the municipality of Akrotiri on the Greek island of Crete. From Gouverneto Monastery, the path to the cave is only accessible by foot. Arkoudiotissa ("she-bear"), is noted for its stalagmite which is said to look like a bear. This cave is believed to have been used for worship since ancient times (as there is evidence for cults of Artemis and Apollo), but was dedicated to the Arkoudiotissa Panaghia (Our Lady) during the Christian era. Ascetics lived in the caves in the area.

Further along the path, after a descent of 140 steps, is the Katholikon (monastic church), the third monastery, now abandoned. It is believed to date from the 5th or 6th Century, founded by St John the Hermit. It is built into the cliff, with a unique church largely carved into the rock-face. This striking set of buildings is now overgrown with fig trees but retains significant charm.
