= Christou =

Christou (Greek: Χρήστου) is a Greek patronymic surname meaning son of Christos. Notable examples include:

- Andreas Christou (born 1948), Mayor of Limassol
- Ang Christou (born 1972), Australian rules footballer
- B. Christou (1941–2018), Australian writer
- Georgia Christou (born 1987), English playwright and screenwriter
- Jani Christou (1926–1970), Greek composer
- Ioannis Christou (born 1983), Greek rower
- Konstantinos Christou (1863–1905), Greek fighter
- Paraskevas Christou (born 1984), Cypriot football player
