= Stavrou =

Stavrou (Greek: Σταύρου) is a Greek surname, a patronymic using the genitive of Stavros.

Notable people with the surname include:

- Andreas Stavrou (born 1988), Cypriot retired footballer
- Andreas Stavrou (footballer, born 1958), Cypriot retired footballer
- Costas Stavrou (born 1965), Cypriot retired footballer
- Debbie Stavrou, English 21st century international lawn and indoor bowler
- Eleni Stavrou (born 1975), Cypriot politician
- Nick Stavrou (born 1969), English football coach and former player
- Nicos Stavrou (born 1971), Cypriot retired footballer
- Yannis Stavrou (born 1948), Greek artist
