= Haegeumgang Theme Museum =

Haegeumgang Theme Museum (해금강테마박물관)
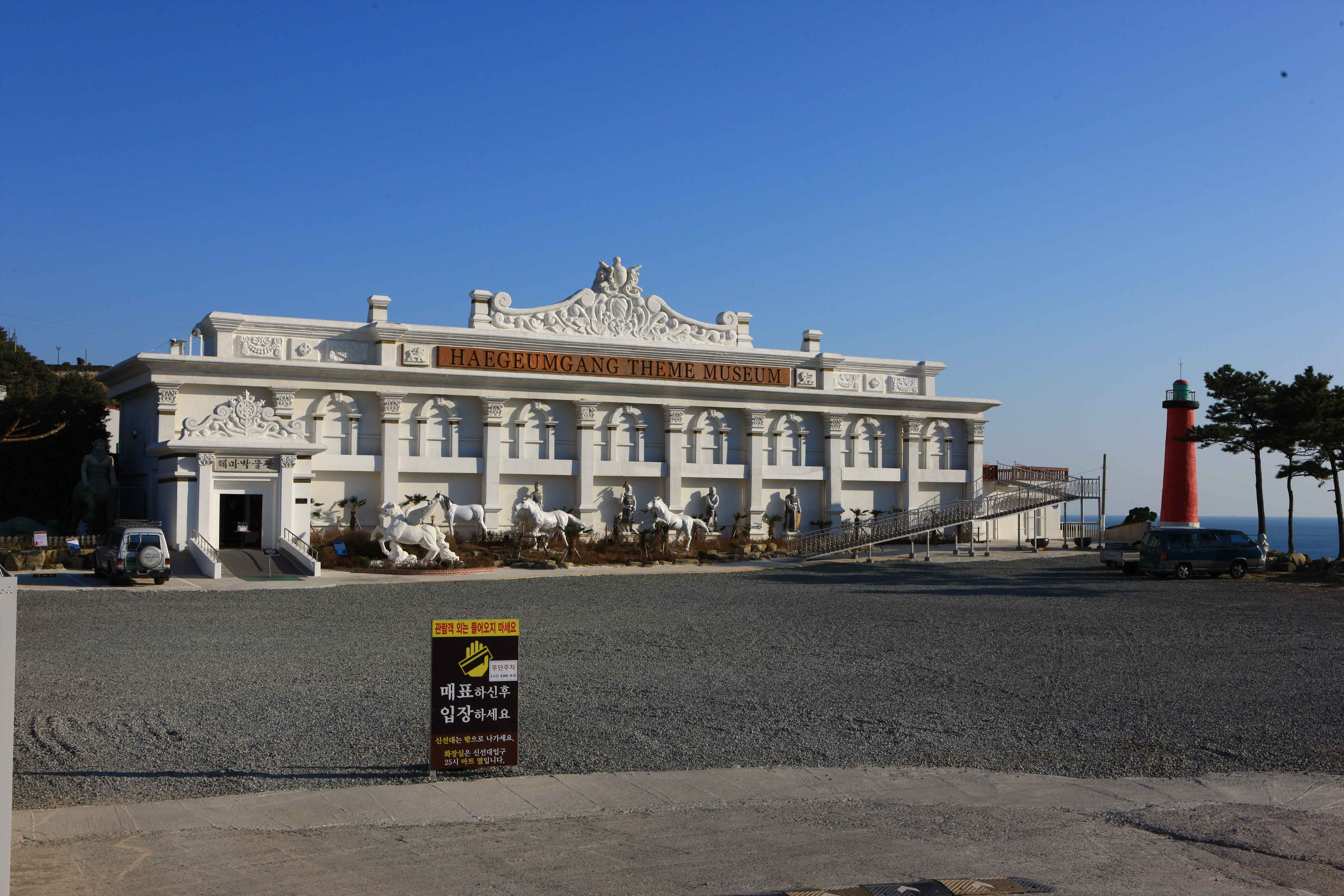
- Location: Geoje, South Gyeongsang Province, South Korea
- Coordinates: 34.74130°N 128.66293°E
- Type: Modern art gallery
- Collections: Yukyung Art Museum; Modern Korean History; European Decorative Art
- Director: Yu Chun-up
- Website: www.hggmuseum.com

The Haegeumgang Theme Museum (해금강 테마 박물관) is a museum for exhibitions of modern art, located in the city of Geoje, South Korea.

== History ==
Inaugurated in 2016, the museum is located next to the Haegeum River on the island of Geoje and was created to establish a link between the Korean tradition and contemporary art and culture. Built on two floors it houses the Museum of Modern Korean History, the Museum of European Decorative Accessories, and the Yukyung Art Museum. It is run by director and Chairman of International Culture and Art Federation in South Korea Yu Chun-up. Although the museum was half destroyed during a typhoon in 2019, it was fully restored and rebuilt in 2020

== Collection ==
On the first floor of the building, the permanent collection is exhibited, with objects about the Korean War and the Vietnam War. They also feature a room with European decorative objects donated to the museum.

== Exhibitions ==
In addition to a contemporary art collection, the Yukyung Art Museum shows temporary exhibitions of international contemporary artists. in 2020 the museum showed the exhibition " Art of Remediation" with Jose Palao, Gloria Keh and Stavros Ditsios. It is since 2016 the venue for The Goje Art Festival, an exhibition of international artists from more than 35 countries, who show their vision around the theme of "Freedom and Peace". In 2021 they showed the exposition "Peace Again" co-hosted by the Korea Artists Association, exhibiting contemporary artists such as Vijay Sharma, Daniel Garbade, Emilio Héctor Rodríguez, Abdoul-Ganiou Dermani, Lei Li, Shefali Ranthe, Heidi Fosli and Michael Lam among 280 artists from 63 countries.
