= Kounoupidiana =

Kounoupidiana Κουνουπιδιανά
- Community
- Aerial photograph of Kounoupidiana

- Location within Greece
- Coordinates: 35°32′10″N 24°04′34″E
- Country: Greece
- Administrative region: Crete
- Regional unit: Chania
- Municipality: Chania
- Municipal unit: Akrotiri

Population (2021)
  - Community: 9,213
- Time zone: UTC+2 (EET)
  - Summer (DST): UTC+3 (EEST)

Kounoupidiana is a village in Crete, Greece, part of the municipal unit of Akrotiri and the largest town on that peninsula with a population of 9,213 (in 2021). It is 8 km northeast of the city of Chania and has become a popular place to live in recent years because of its healthy climate, the nearby Technical University of Crete and close proximity to Chania International Airport and the beaches of Kalathas and Stavros.
