= Agia Triada Monastery =

Greek Orthodox monastery in Crete

- Μονή Αγίας Τριάδος
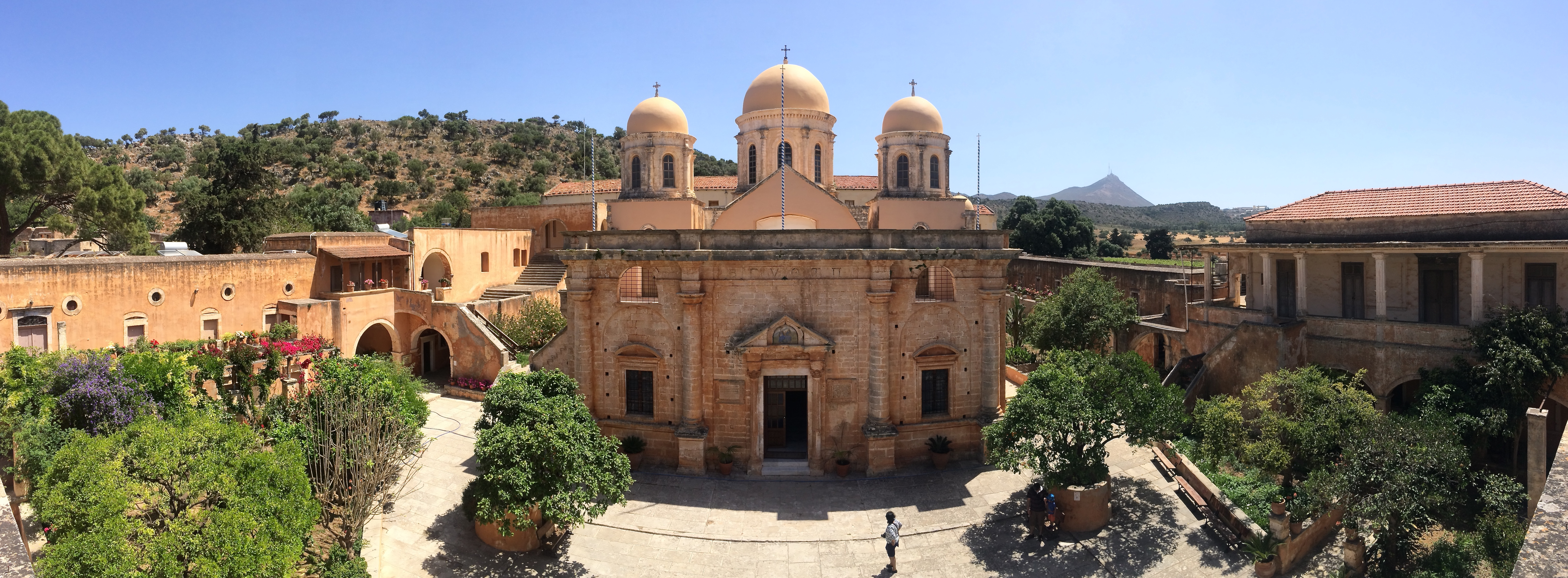
- The monastery in 2015

- Location of the monastery in Crete
- Interactive map of Agia Triada Monastery

Monastery information
- Order: Ecumenical Patriarchate of Constantinople
- Denomination: Greek Orthodox Church
- Dedication: Holy Trinity
- Archdiocese: Church of Crete

Architecture
- Status: Monastery
- Functional status: Active
- Style: Byzantine
- Completion date: 17th century

Site
- Location: Akrotiri, Chania, Crete
- Country: Greece
- Coordinates: 35°33′38″N 24°8′6″E
- Website: www.agiatriada-chania.gr

The Agia Triada Monastery (Greek: Μονή Αγίας Τριάδος, romanized: Moni Agias Triadas), also known as the Monastery of Agia Triada Tsangarolon, is a Greek Orthodox monastery in the Akrotiri peninsula in the Chania region of Crete, Greece. The complex also contains a museum. The monastery, whose name means "Holy Trinity", was built in the 17th century by two brothers of the Venetian Zangaroli family on the site of a pre-existing church. The monks produce and sell wine and olive oil on the premises.

== Architecture ==
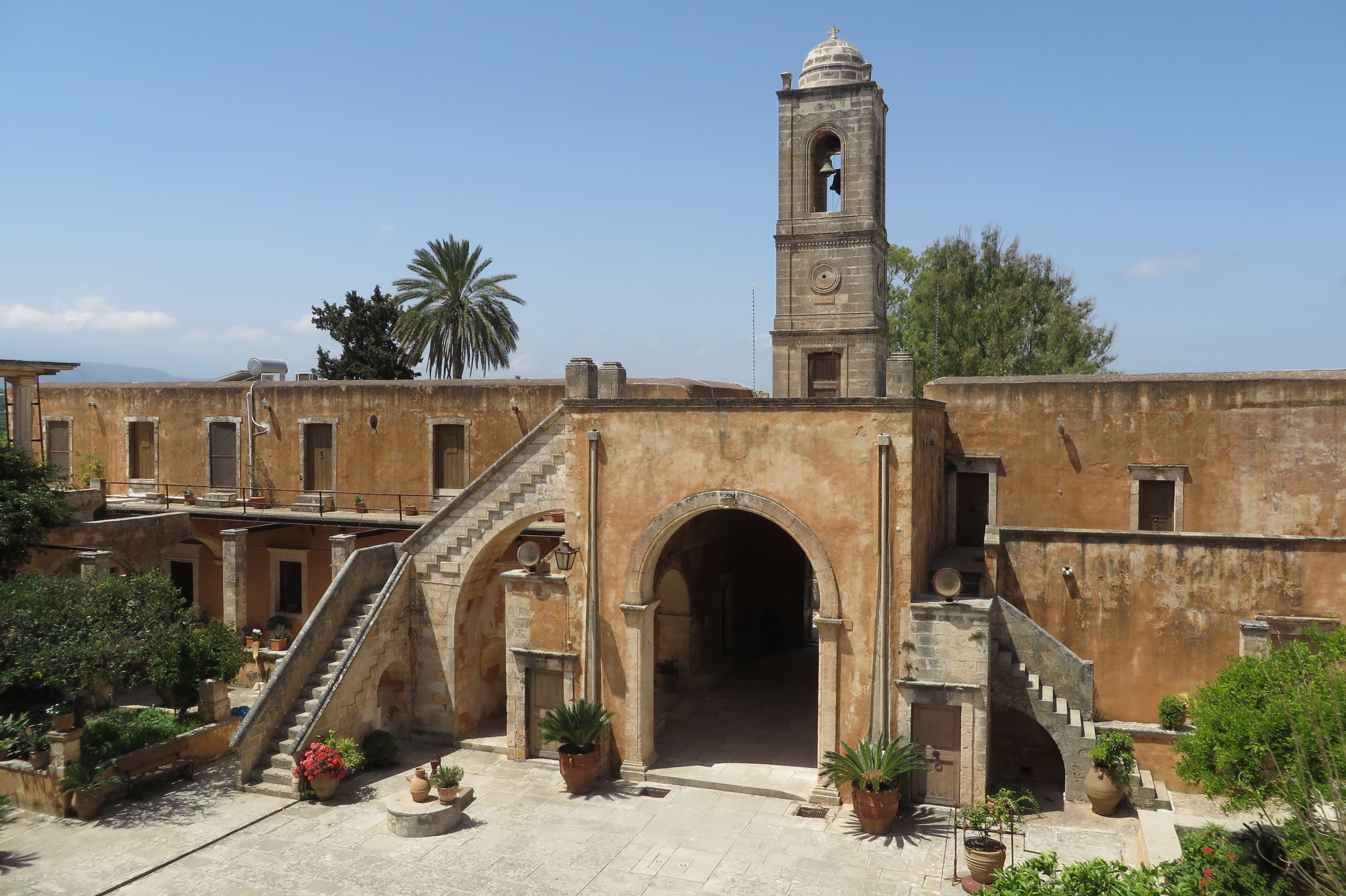

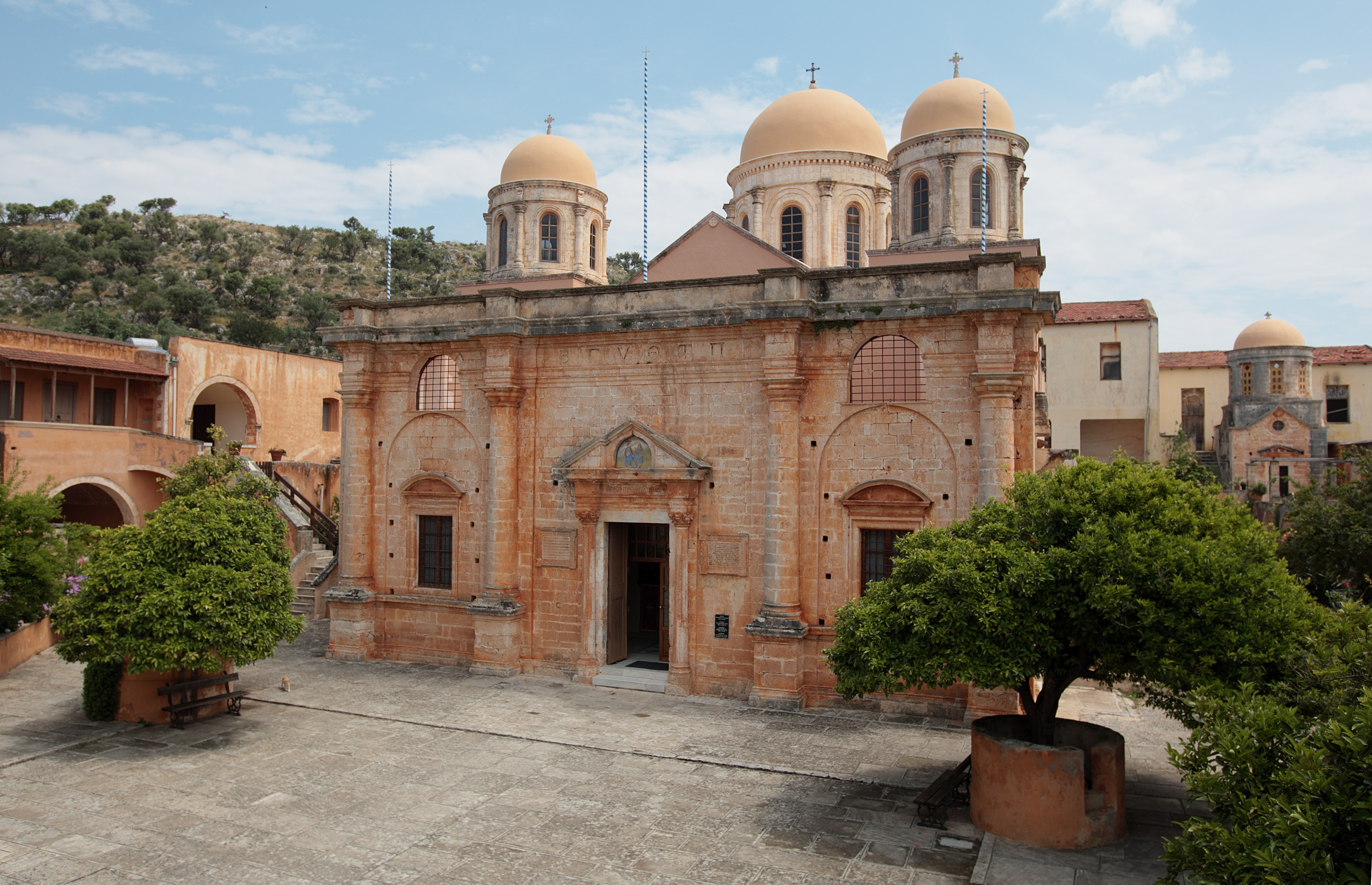

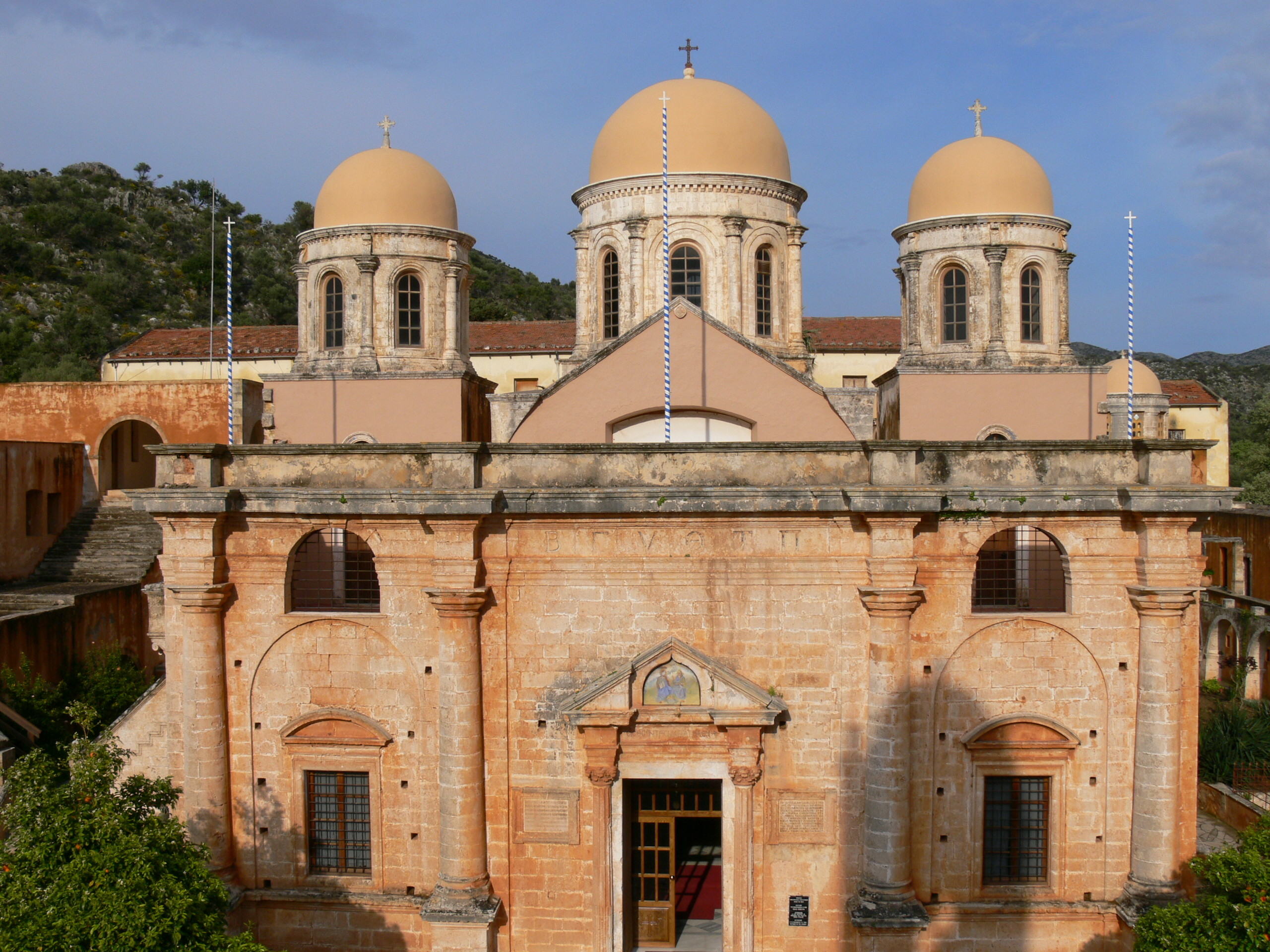

The church is built in the Byzantine cruciform style with three domes. The main church is flanked by two smaller domed chapels, one of which is dedicated to the Life-Giving Spring (Zoodochos Pigi) and the other to Saint John the Theologian. The main church is dedicated to the Holy Trinity and the church has a narthex at the front set at right angles to the main aisle. There are two large Doric-style columns and one smaller, Corinthian-style column on either side of the main entrance. The facade of the church has double columns of Ionian and Corinthian style and bears an inscription in Greek, which is dated to 1631. The monastery's cellar door is dated from 1613. In the 19th century the monastery was established as an important theological school from 1833, and the belfry is dated to 1864. The monastery was later extensively damaged during conflicts with the Turks and in 1892, a seminary was established.

== Museum ==
The monastery also has a library which contains some rare books, and a museum which contains a collection of icons and a collection of codices. Important exhibits include a portable icon of St John the Theologian dated to around 1500, The Last Judgment, work of Emmanuel Skordiles from 17th century, St John the Precursor (1846), The Tree of Jesse (1853), The Hospitality of Abraham and The Descent into Hades (1855), The Story of Beauteaus Joseph (1858) and a manuscript on a parchment roll with the mass of St Basil.

== Gallery ==
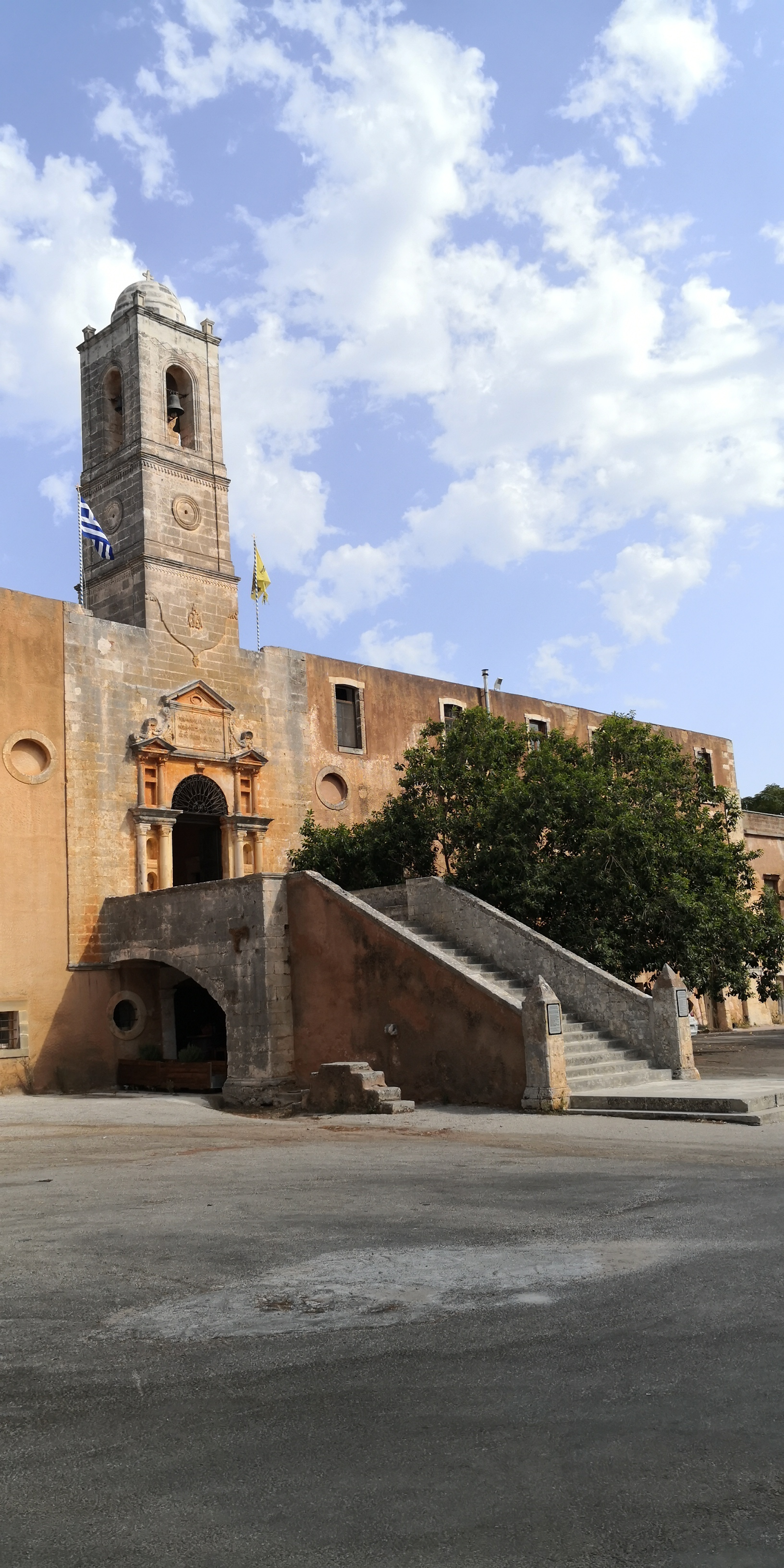

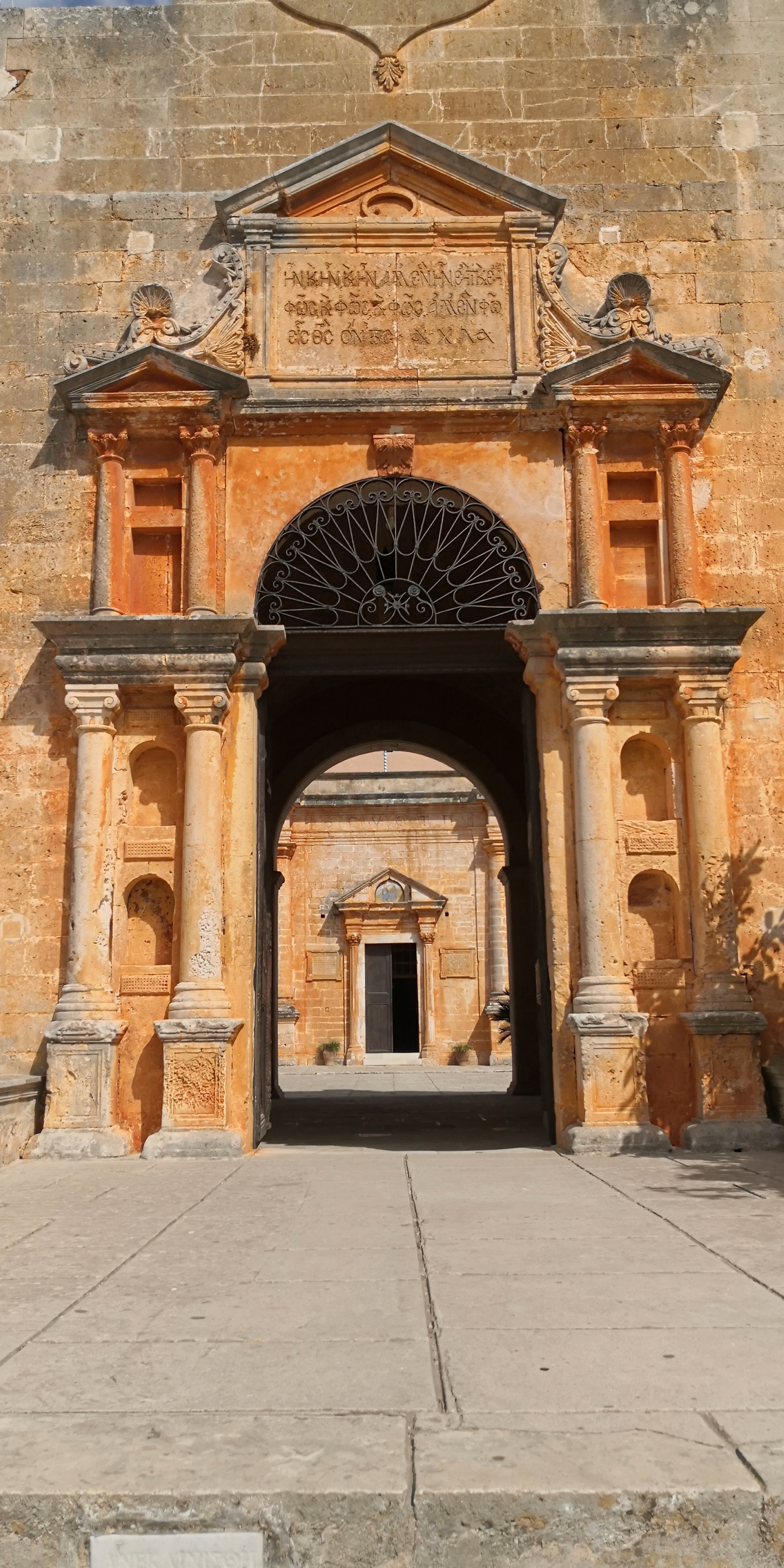

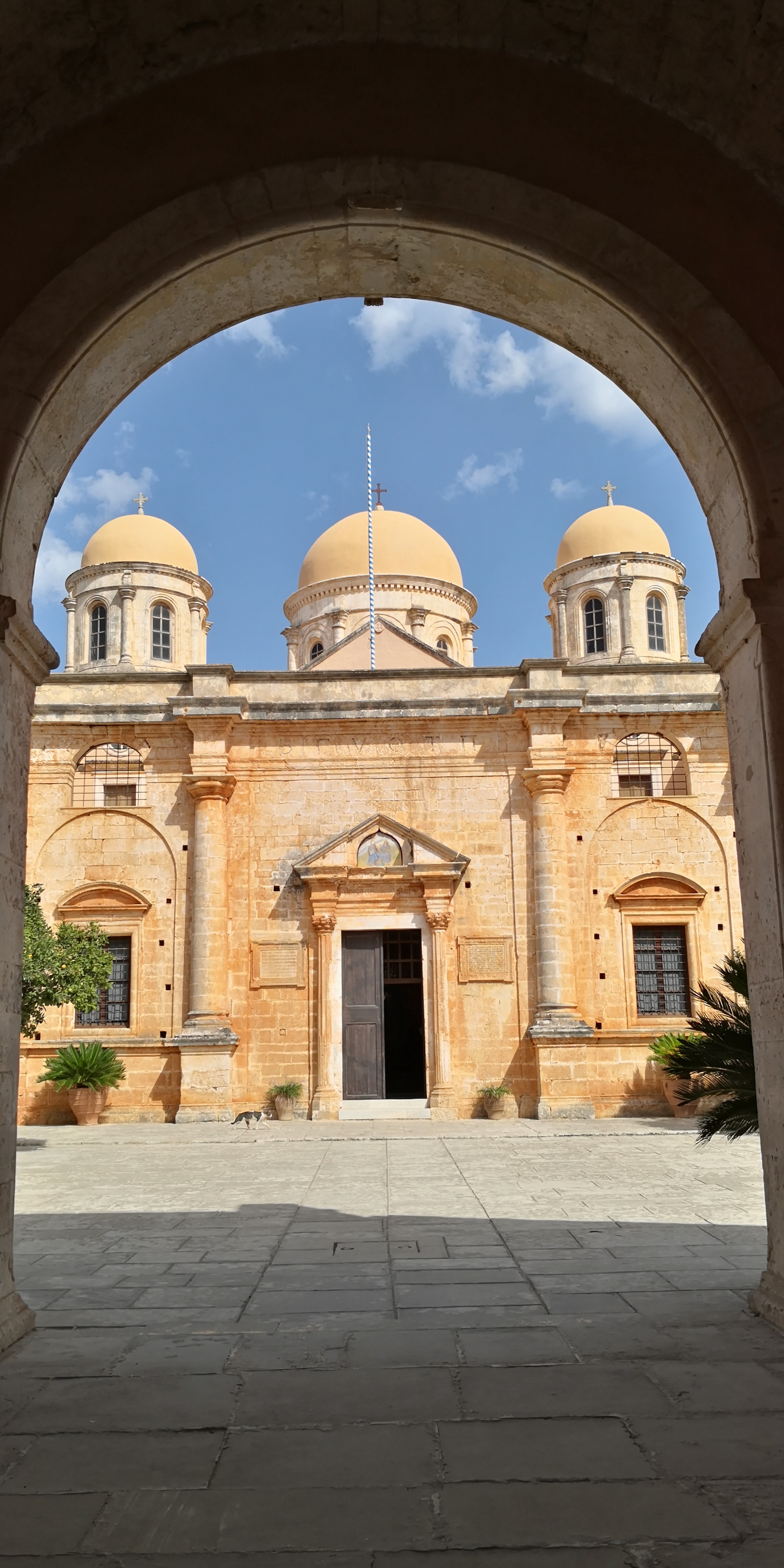

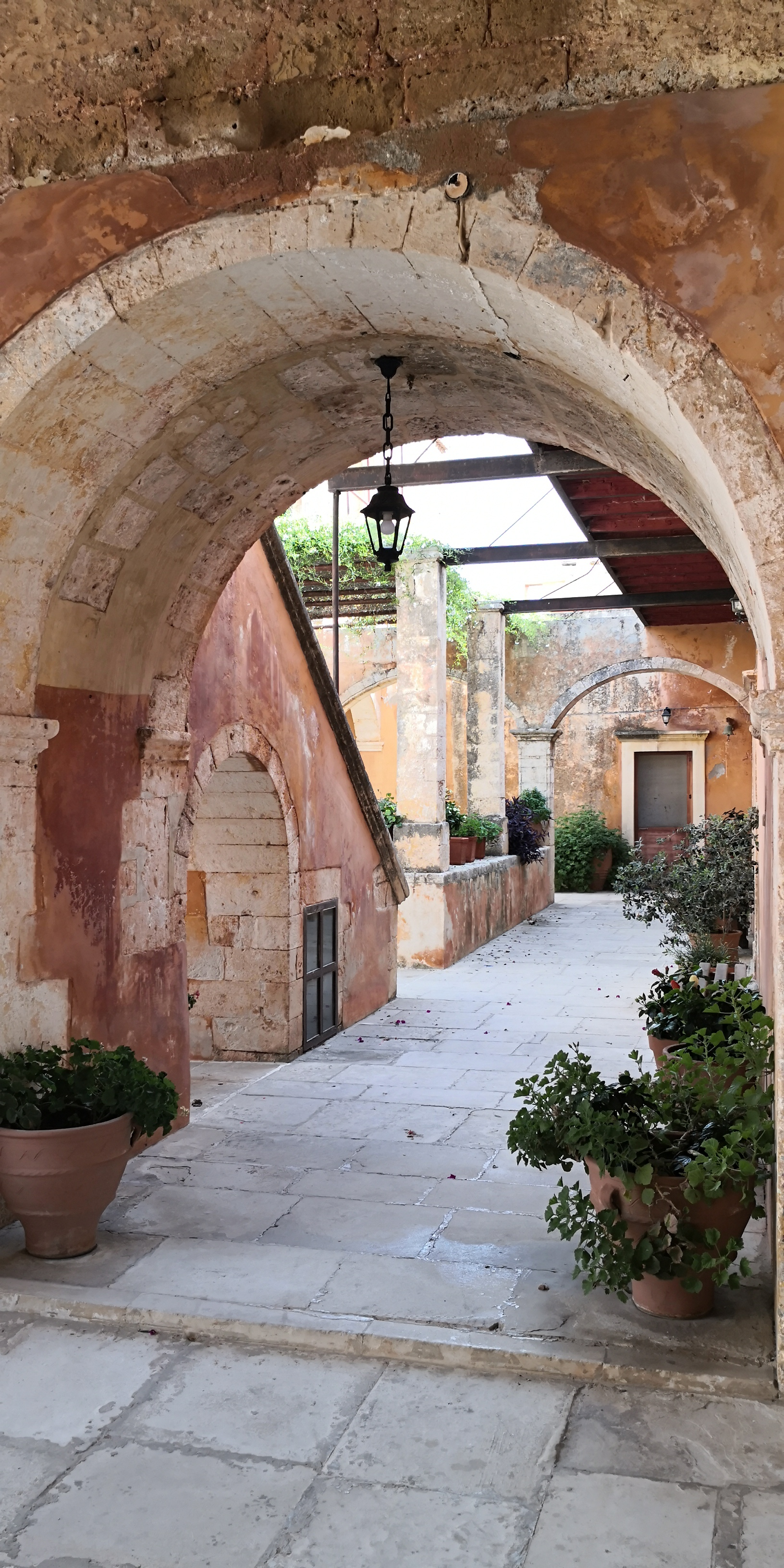

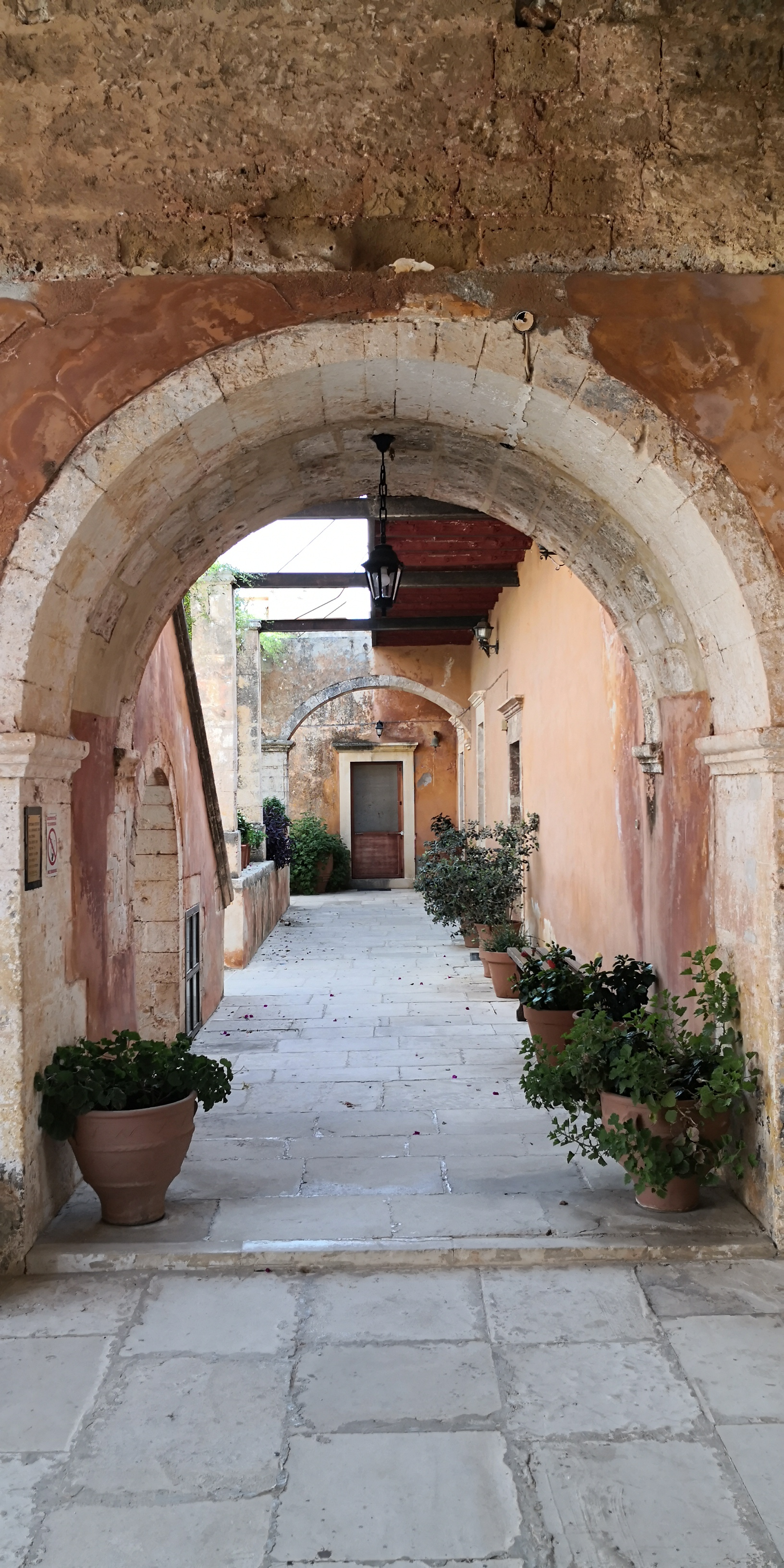

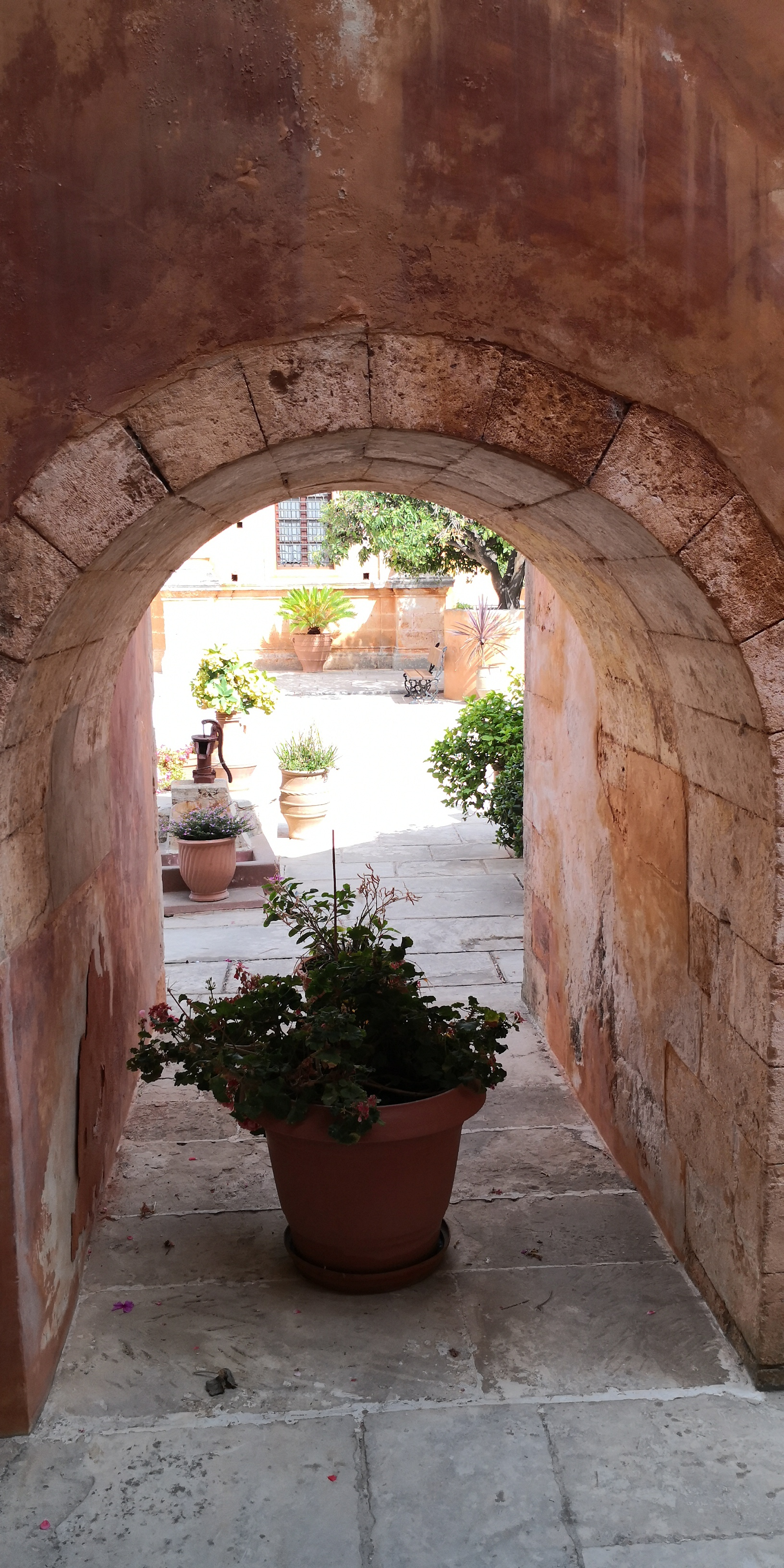

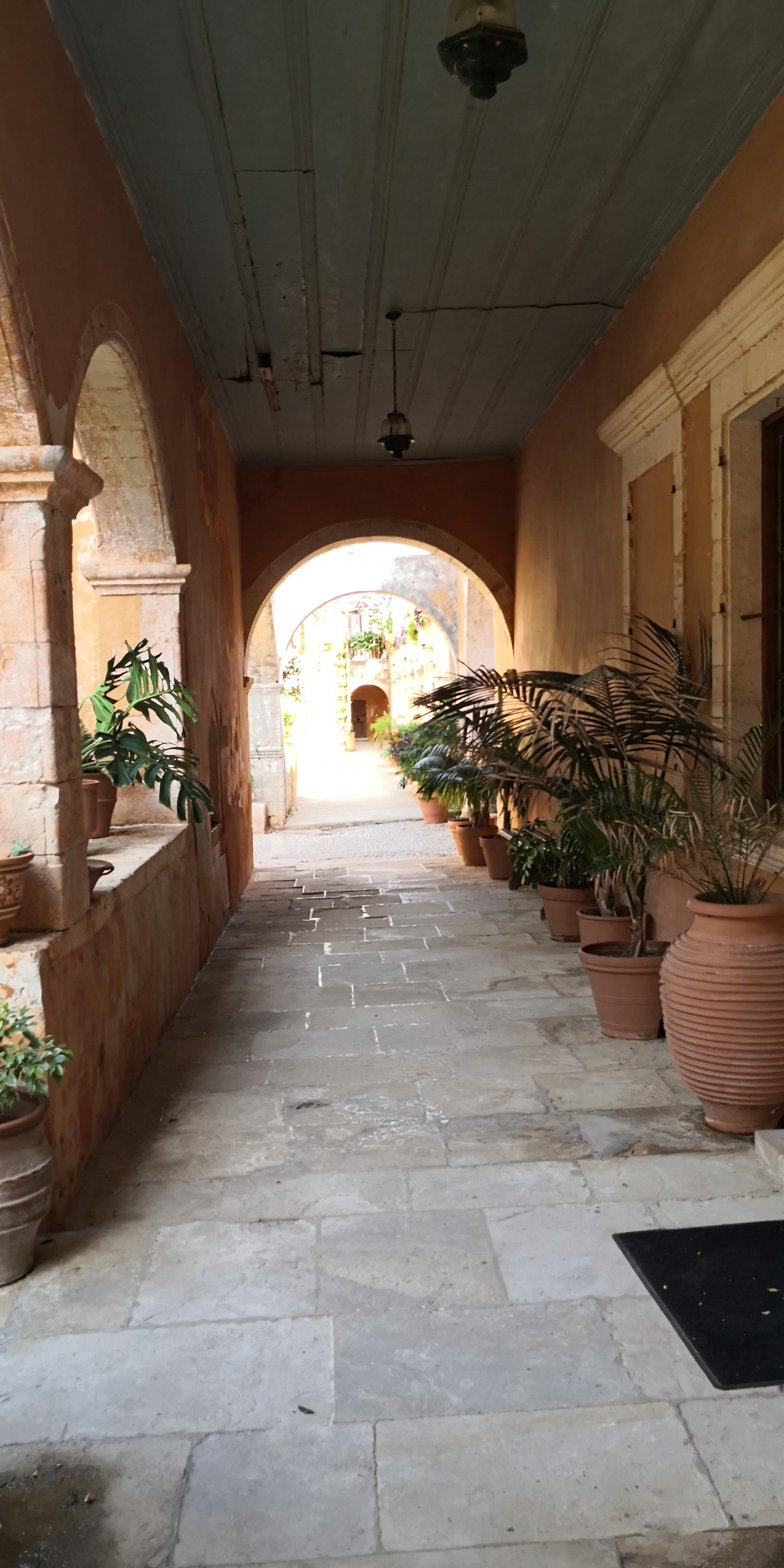

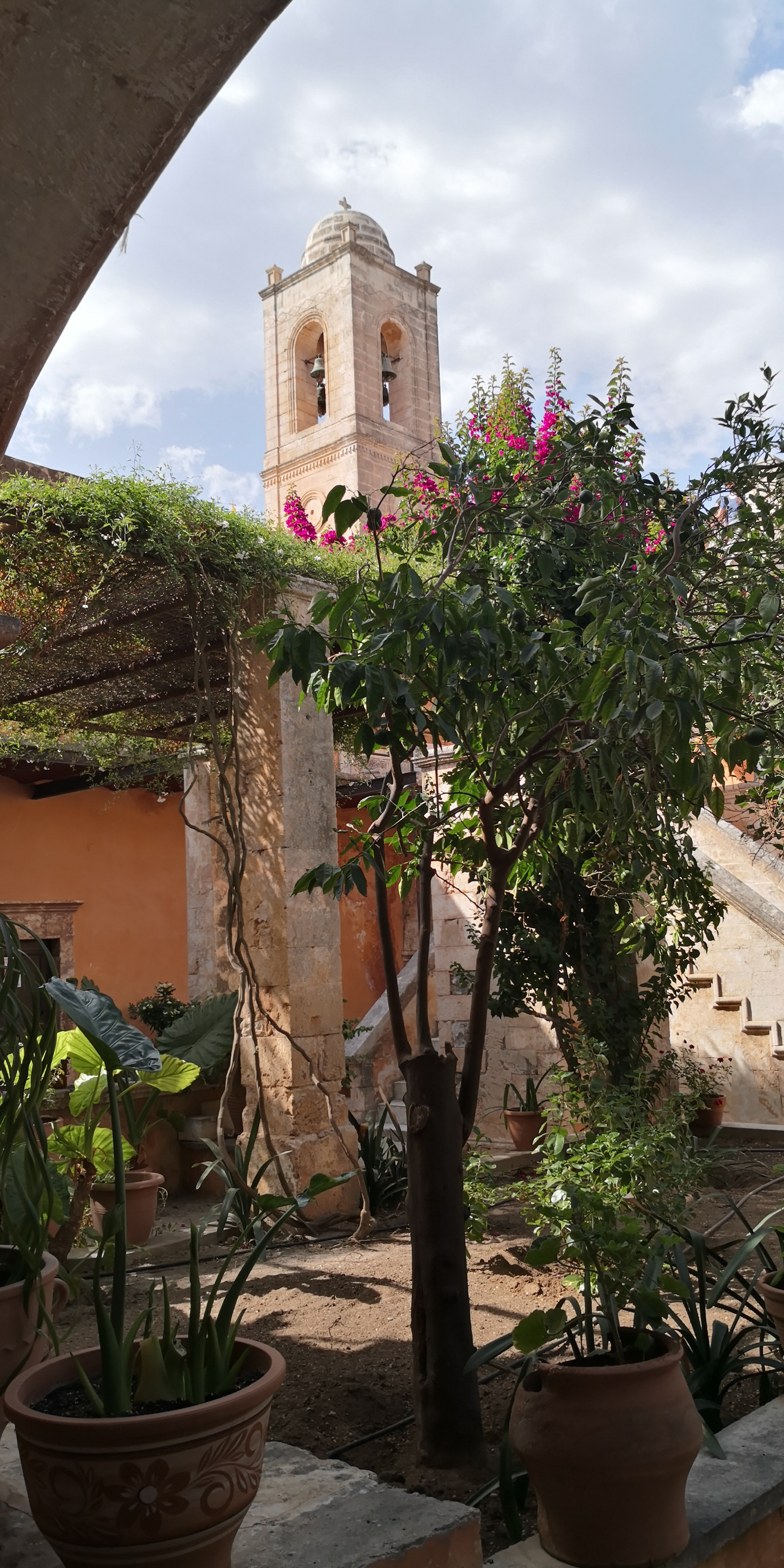

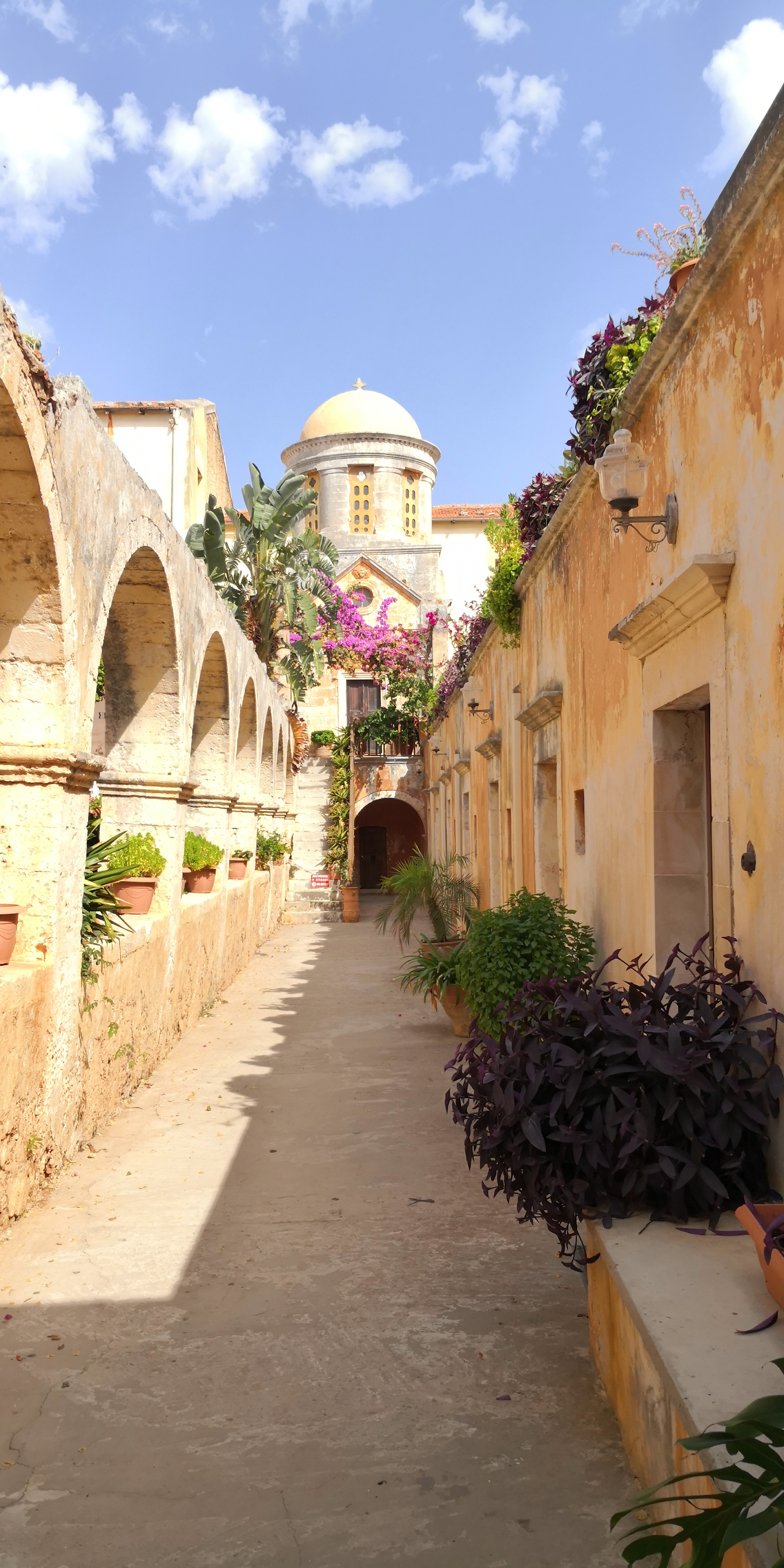

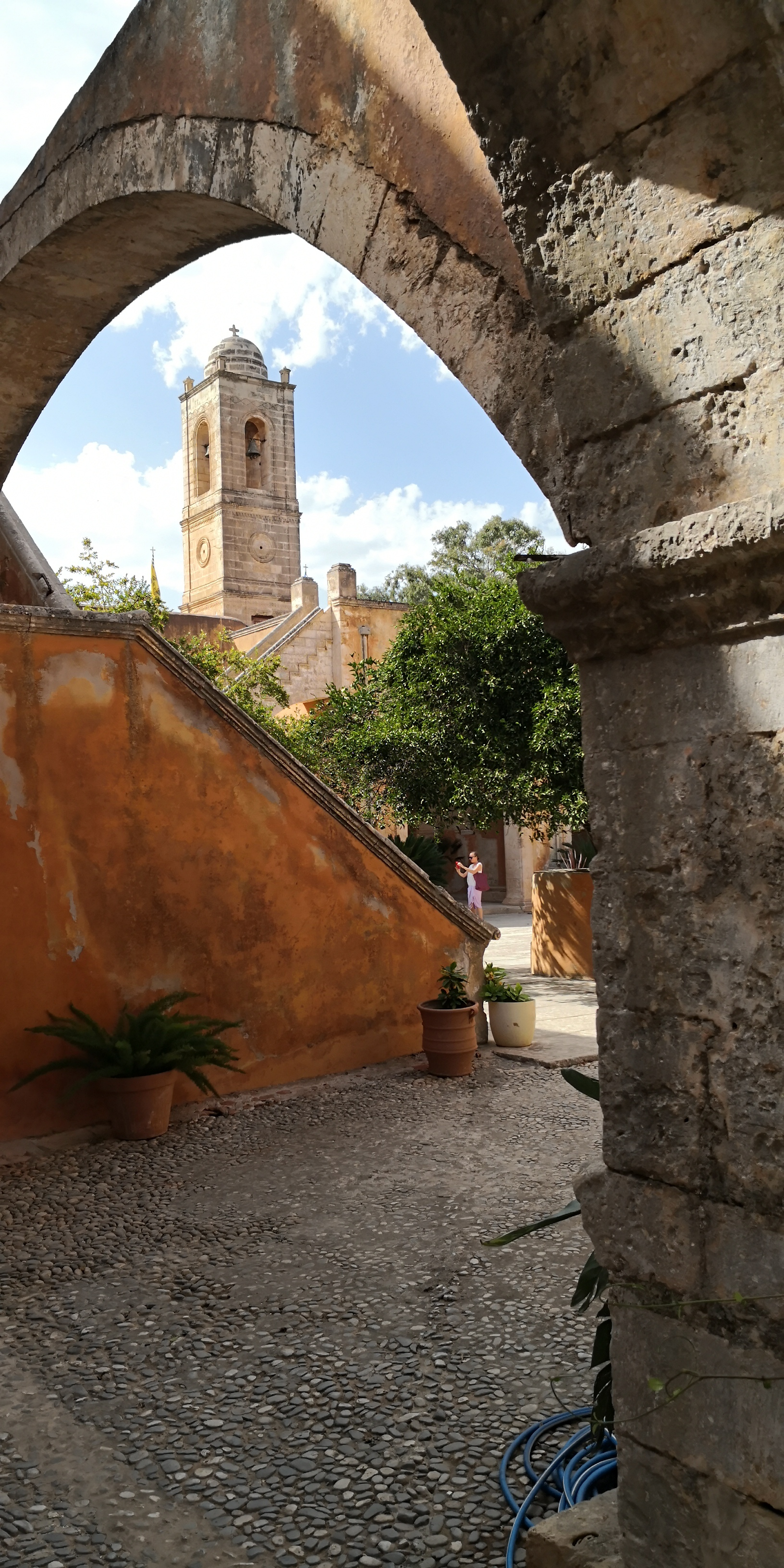

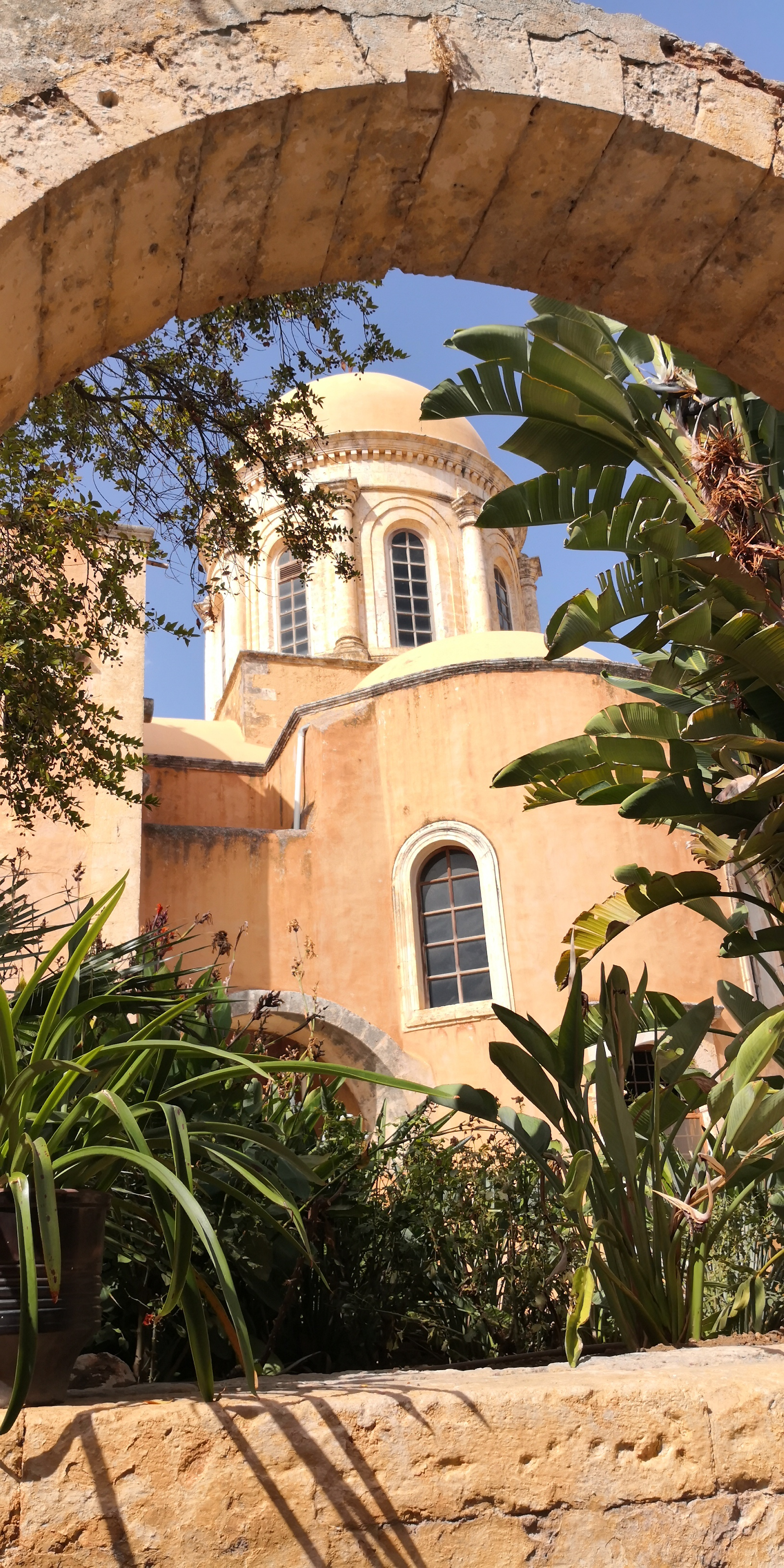

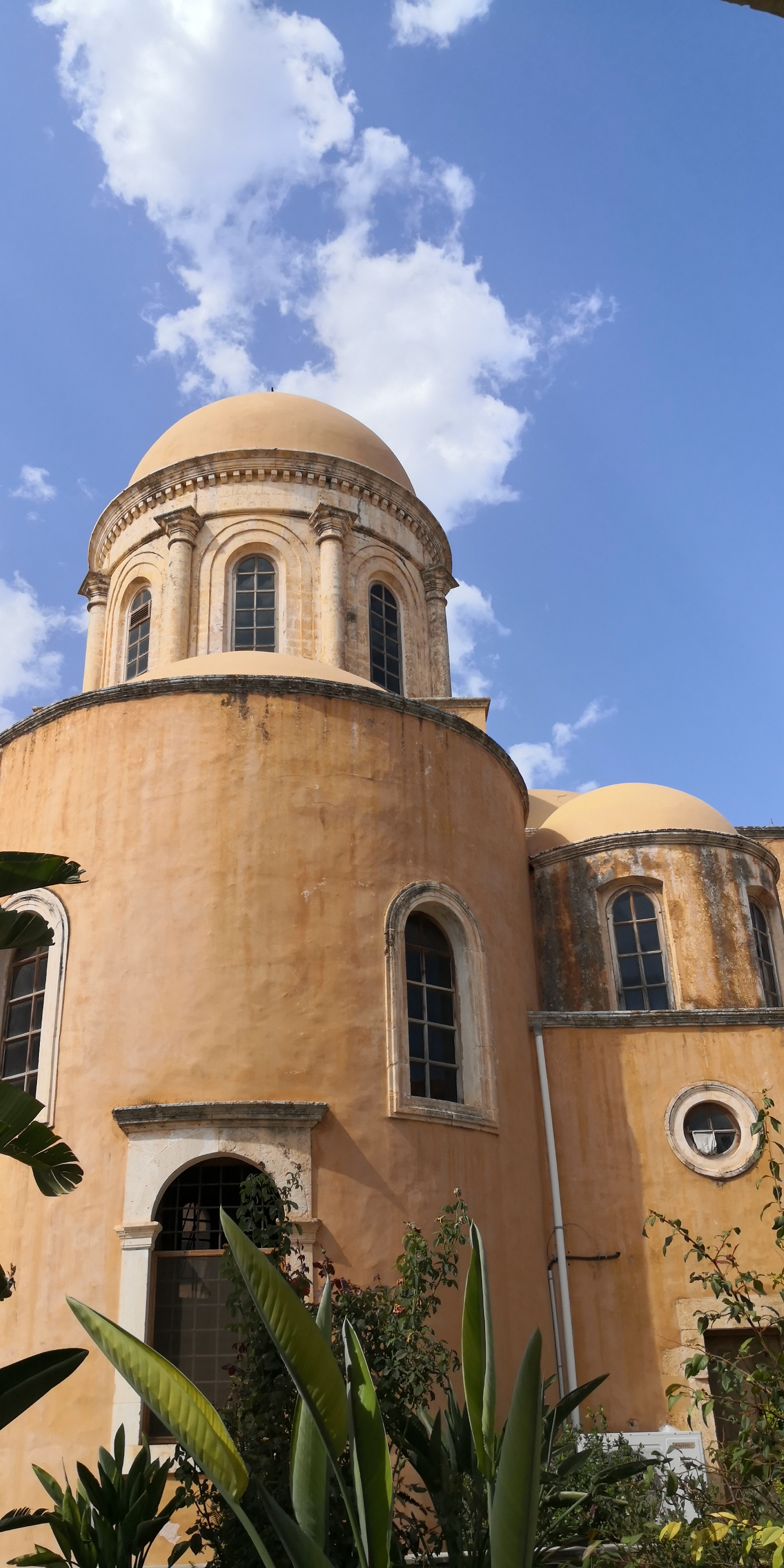

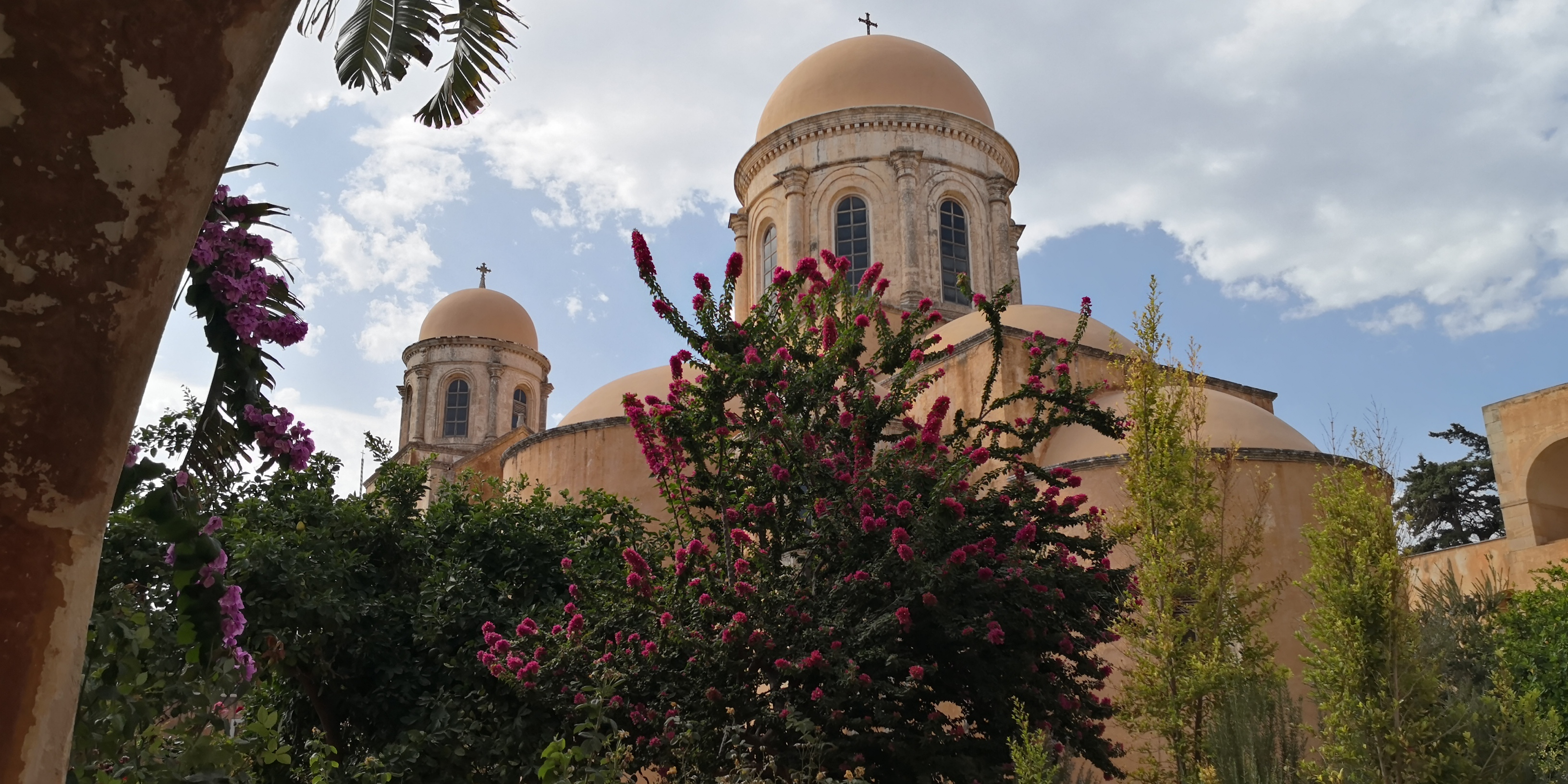

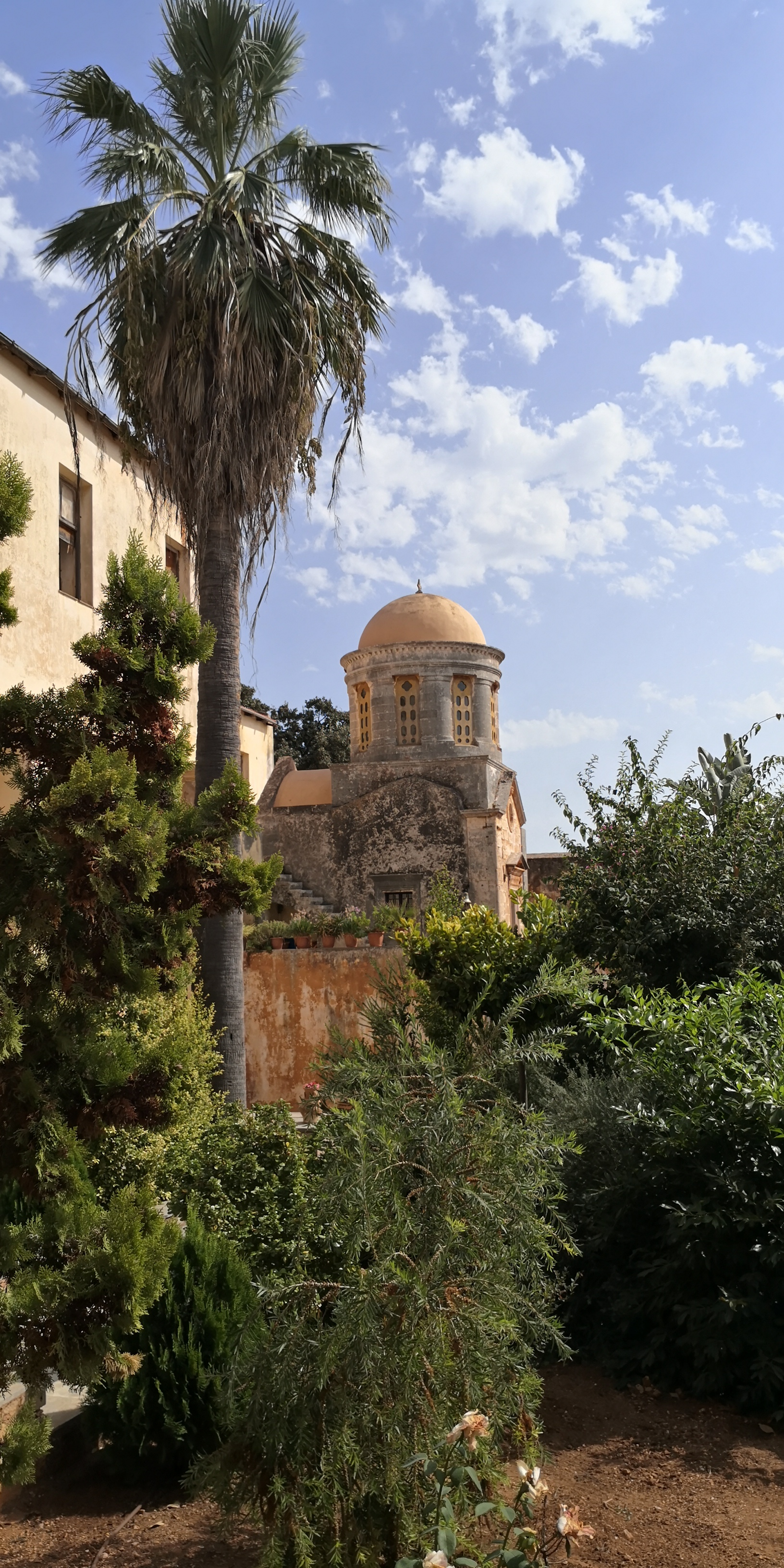

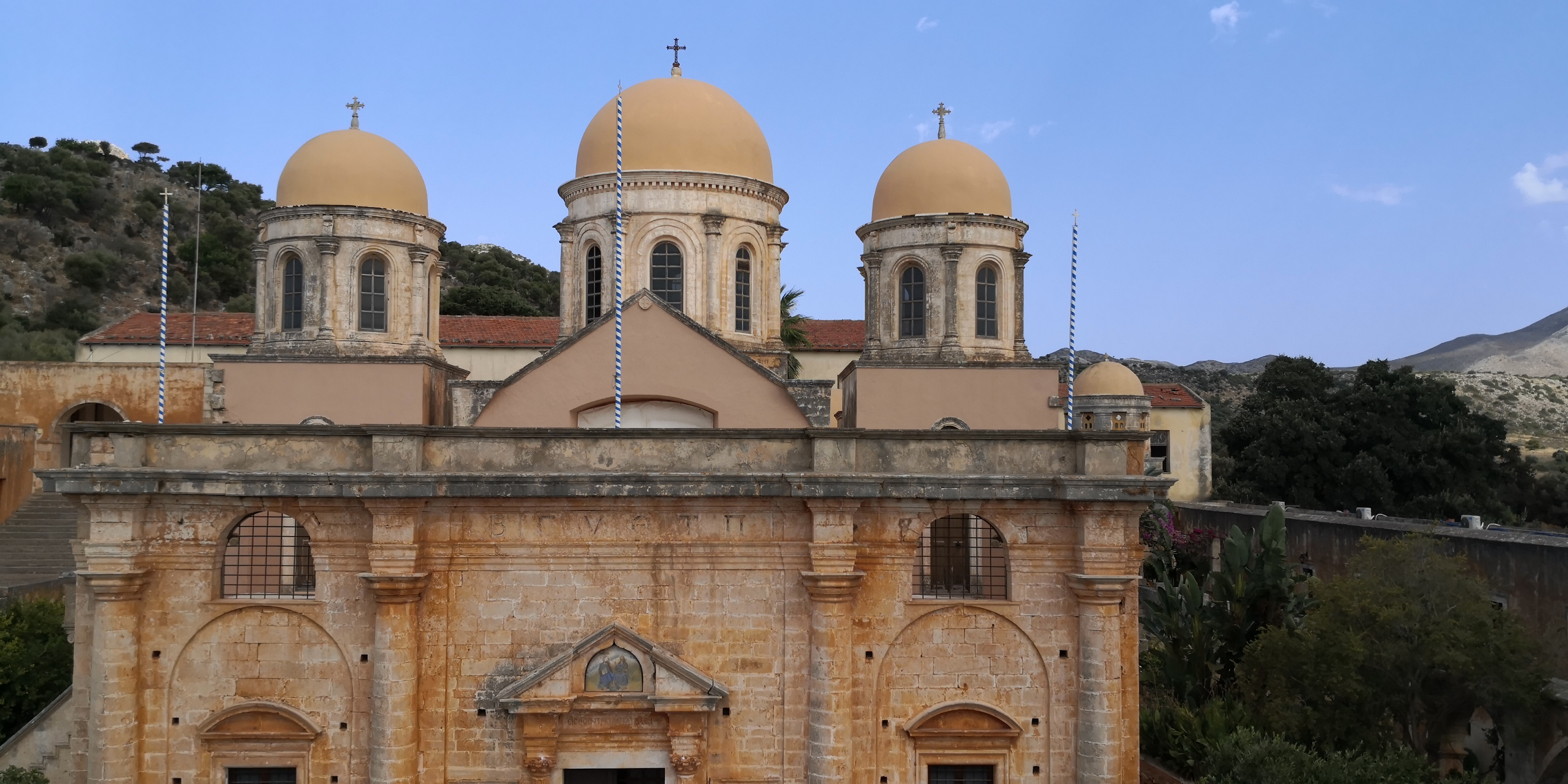

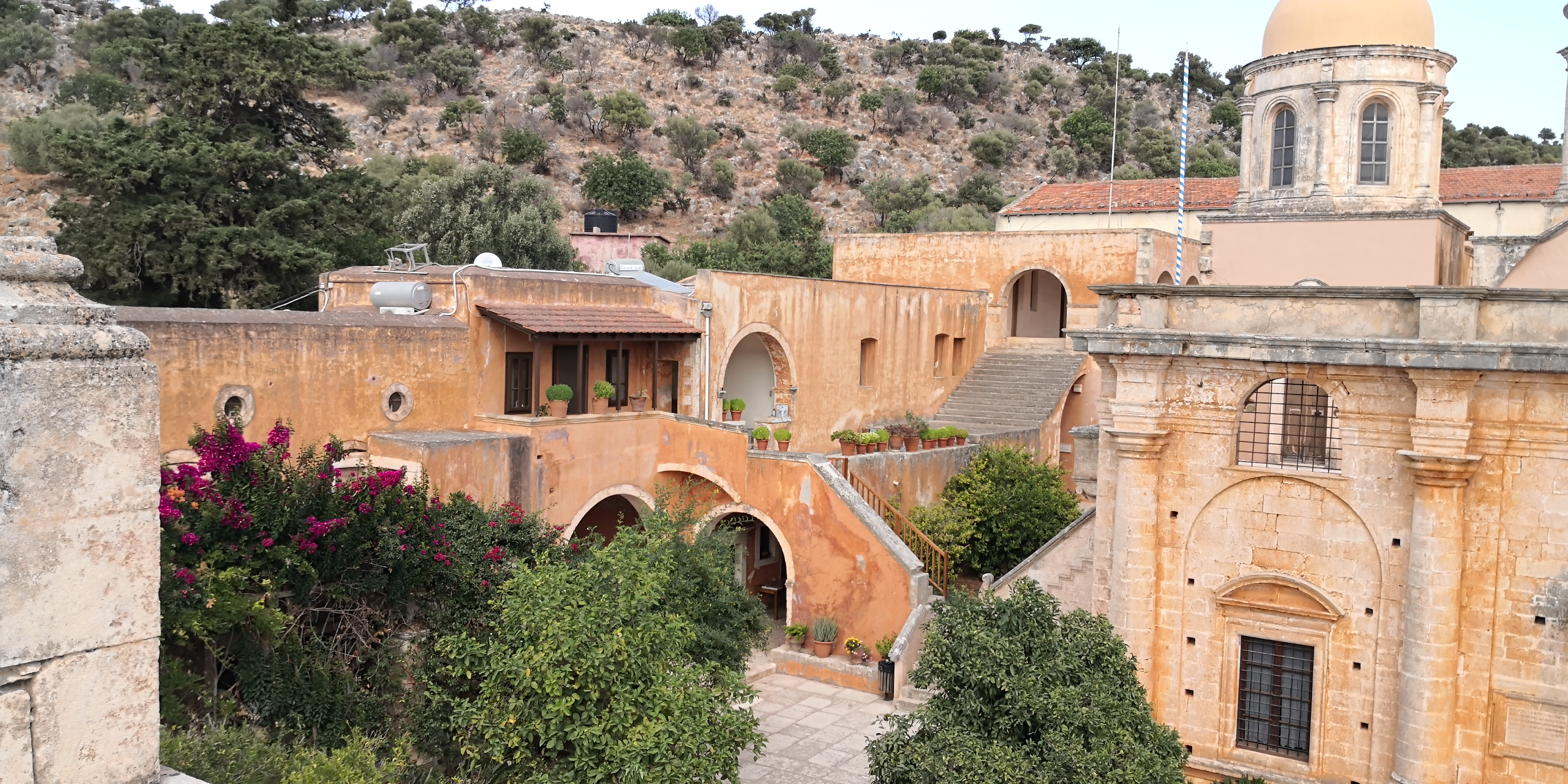

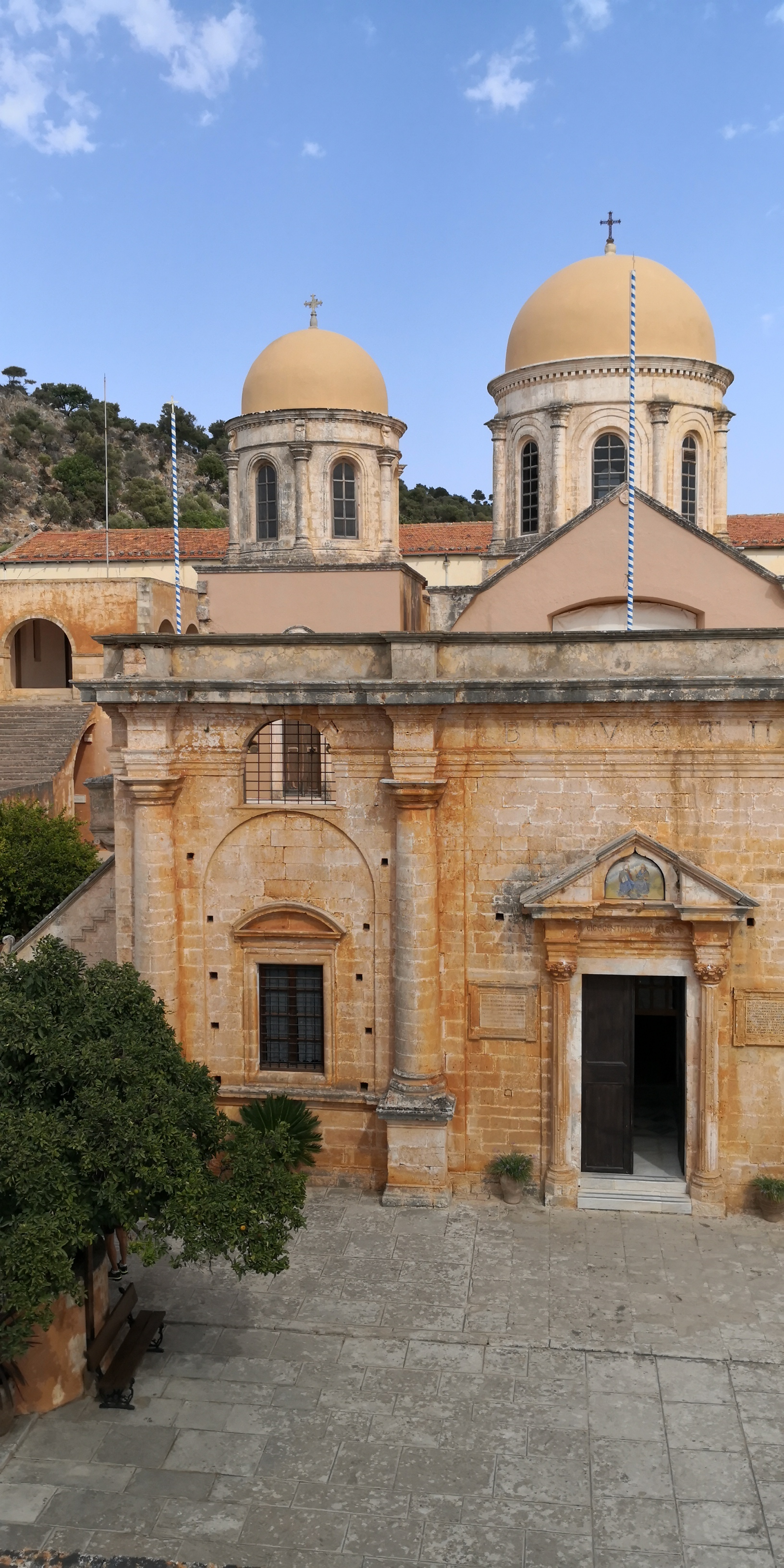

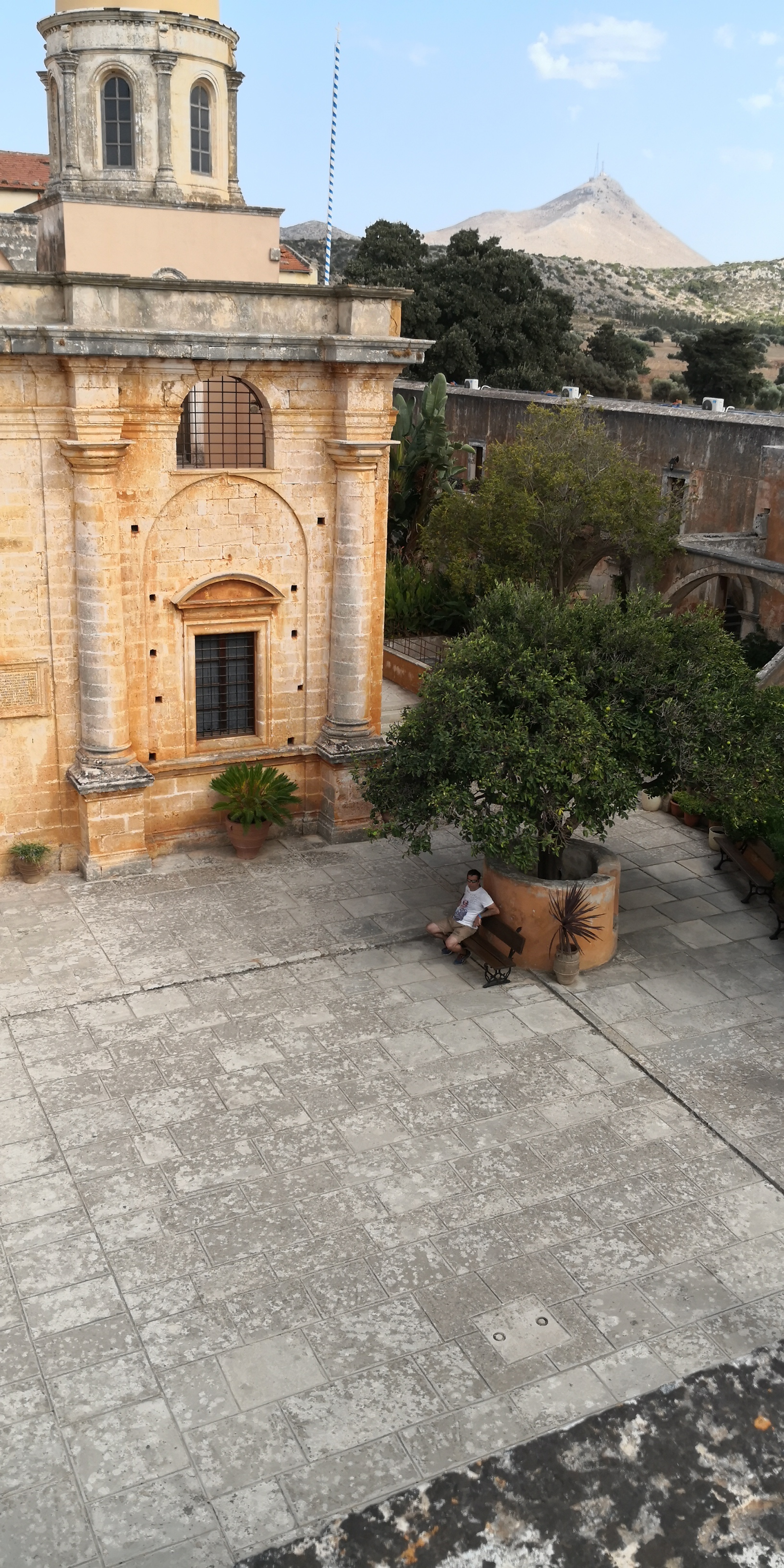

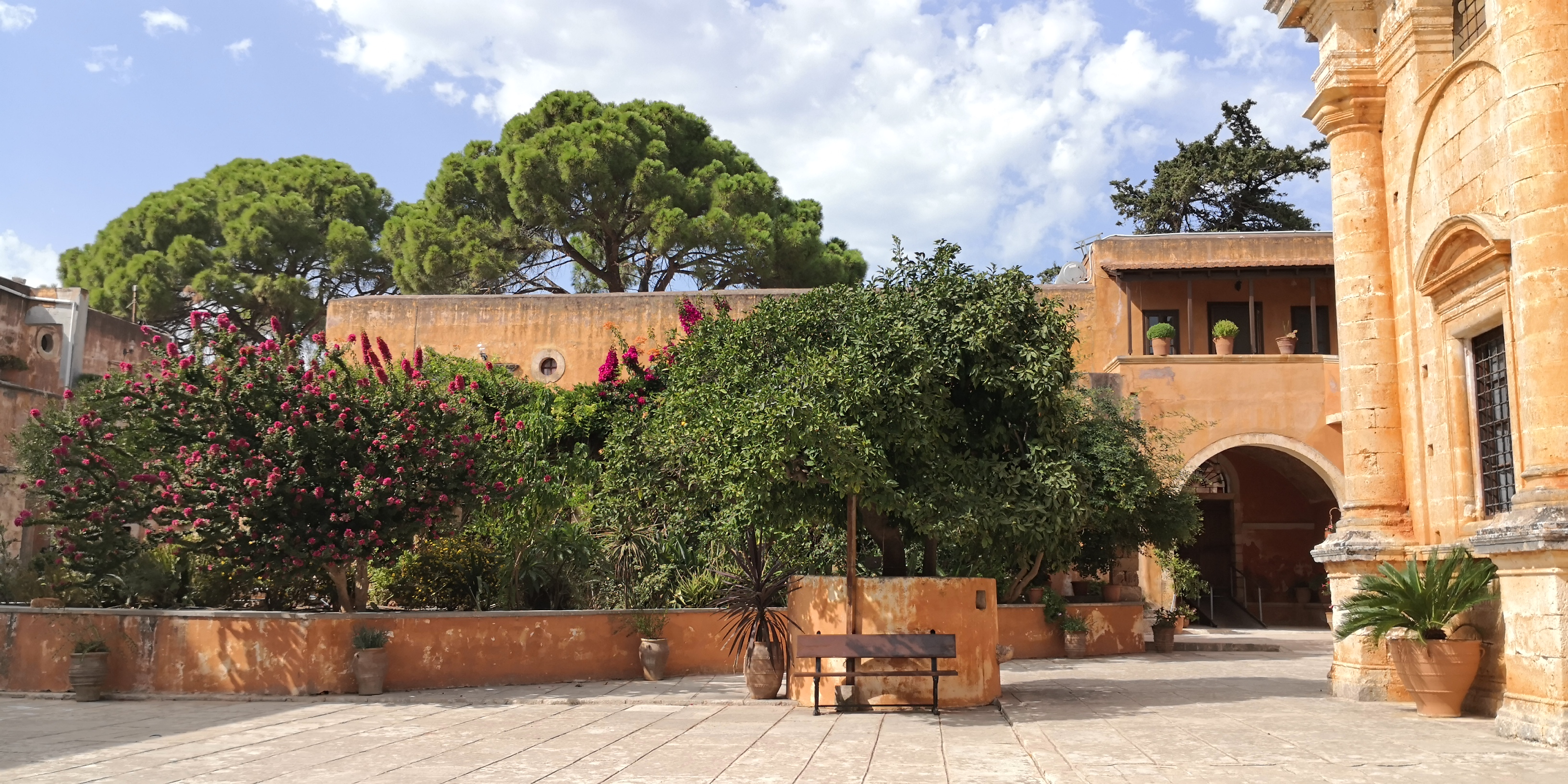

== See also ==
- Church of Crete
- List of Greek Orthodox monasteries in Greece
- List of museums in Greece
