= Christos (given name) =

Greek male given name

Christos is a common Greek given name, which may be spelled as Christos, Chrestos, Chreistos, Christus, Chrestus, and Chreistus, pronounced identically (cf. iotacism). Nicknames include Chris, Chrissie, Chrissy, Chreissie, Chreissy, Chreis, Essie, Eissie, Tos, Tossie, and Issie

== Derivation ==
=== Χρίστος ===
The Greek name Χρίστος is derived from the earlier word χριστός (note the difference in accentuation), meaning "anointed" and which became the Christian theological term for the Messiah.

=== Χρήστος ===
The spelling of the Greek name Χρήστος suggests a derivation from the word χρηστός, which in earlier forms of the language principally meant "useful", and in modern Greek means "ethical, righteous, good, just, upright, virtuous".

== Transposition of accent ==
Transposing the accent to the first syllable distinguishes Χρίστος (Christos), the common name, from Χριστός, Jesus Christ. Similarly, the given name Stavros (Σταύρος, Stávros) has the stress on the first syllable, differentiating it from σταυρός (stavrós), the Christian cross.

Constantine P. Cavafy gave two reasons for the transposition of the accent in the name "Christos": firstly, the rule of transposition of the accent from the final syllable to the immediately preceding syllable in ancient adjectives when they become proper nouns, "and secondly, the pious practice of differentiating in appearance from the divine epithet". Cavafy gave other anthropological examples of the need felt to distinguish between the "sacred" and the "profane", and university professor Giorgos Veloudis added tο Cavafy's examples the distinction between the "profane" word Σταύρος (the name "Stavros") and the "sacred" word σταυρός ("cross").

Veloudis also mentioned the reverse process whereby Christians have treated as "profane" the names of pre-Christian divinities such as Hermes, Artemis, Athena, Aphrodite, names used today by Greek-speakers.

== See also ==
- , which includes people with first name "Christos"
