= Stavros Vavouris =

Greek poet

Stavros Vavouris (Greek: Σταύρος Βαβούρης; 1925 – 7 November 2008) was a Greek poet.

== Biography ==
Stavros Vavouris was born in Athens, Greece, in 1925, suffering a cerebral palsy. He published his first poem entitled Chimera (Χίμαιρα) in the journal Juvenile Voice (Νεανική Φωνή). He graduated in Literature, History and Architecture at the University of Athens in 1952. In the same year he published his first collection of poetry entitled Here You Imagine Gallops and Waves (Εδώ φαντάσου καλπασμούς και κύματα). He taught in several schools in different parts of Greece and Athens. He worked at the Ministry of Education from 1964 to 1967. He was appointed a high school director in 1980 and remained in that positions until 1984, when he had to quit due to health problems. He authored twelve books which have been translated into English, Polish and German.

== Works ==
- Here You Imagine Gallops and Waves (Εδώ φαντάσου καλπασμούς και κύματα, 1952)
- Poems (Ποιήματα, 1977)
- Carmina Profana (1983)
- Instantaneous: We (Τα ακαριαία: εμείς (1980-1984), 1984)
- Που πάει, που με πάει αυτό το ποίημα (1985)
- Ημέρες, νύχτες που ναι τες; (1987)
- Πού πήγε, ως πού πήγε αυτό το ποίημα (1998)
- Also This? Perhaps (Κι αυτά; Ίσως, 1999)
