= Stavros Ditsios =

Greek visual artist

Stavros Ditsios (Greek: Σταύρος Δίτσιος, born 31 March 1978) is a Greek visual artist, known for abstract paintings and sculpture. He studied as a painter at the Academy of Fine Arts in Florence, Italy, from 1997 until 2001. Ditsios now lives and works in Thessaloniki, Greece.

== Personal life ==
Stavros Ditsios was born in Thessaloniki, Greece, where he grew up, and went to school in Panorama, Thessaloniki. His father was a merchant. At the age of seven, Ditsios took first prize in an exhibition for young artists in Y.M.C.A of Panorama, Thessaloniki. His parents organized a solo exhibition of his paintings in the back yard of his house, and his school also organized a solo exhibition for him. After finishing school he studied line drawing as preparation for the Fine Arts Academy in Florence. In 1996 he went to Siena in Italy to study Italian language. After passing the exams in 1997, he studied at the Academy of Fine Arts, where Professor Umberto Borella was among his tutors.

Ditsios married a ballet teacher, Eva Fevgidou, in 2012, and they have a daughter.

== Early career ==
While he was studying in Florence, Ditsios introduced his own technique called “Vavoura” (confusion). Ditsios unsuccessfully attempted to demonstrate this outside the Uffizi Museum by offering tourists to draw on a 4x1 height canvas. While in Florence, he got engaged with music and he produced his own colour palette that corresponded to music notes inspired by Wassily Kandinskyy. After music, he began writing poetry. After finishing his studies, he moved to Thessaloniki, Greece, where he opened his own studio and began working in the family business of lighting equipment as a light designer.

== Exhibitions ==
=== Solo exhibitions ===
- Cultural Centre, Thessaloniki, town hall Panorama on 12 December 2015
- Vilka Gallery, Thessaloniki, 2010
- Artower Agora Gallery, Athens, 2002

=== Group exhibitions ===
- Art is Hard, Harbour, Warehouse 9, Thessaloniki 2013
- Art is Hard, Harbour, Warehouse 7, Thessaloniki 2012
- Harbour, Warehouse C’, Thessaloniki, 2011
- Harbour, Warehouse C’, Thessaloniki, 2010
- Artists Exhibition, Block 33, Thessaloniki, 2009
- Artists International Meeting, Biennale 2, Thessaloniki, 2009
- International Art Festival, Chania, Crete, 2004
- Cultural Center of the Municipality of Koridallos, Athens, 2003
- Exhibition for the Anti-Cancer Donation, Hotel Nefeli, Thessaloniki, 2002
- Artower Agora Gallery, Athens, 2002
- Graduate Exhibition, Florence, Italy, 2001
- Italian Students Exhibition, Torino, 2000
- Group Exhibition of the Academy of Fine Arts, Florence, Italy, 1999
- Ditsios paintings are exhibited in the museum of Vorre in Athens, in the Greek ministries of Justice and Internal Affairs, and in private collections (mainly Greece, Spain and Germany).
- Art of redemption, Haegeumgang Theme Museum, Geoje, South Korea
