= Akrotiri, Crete =

Akrotiri Ακρωτήρι
- Municipal unit
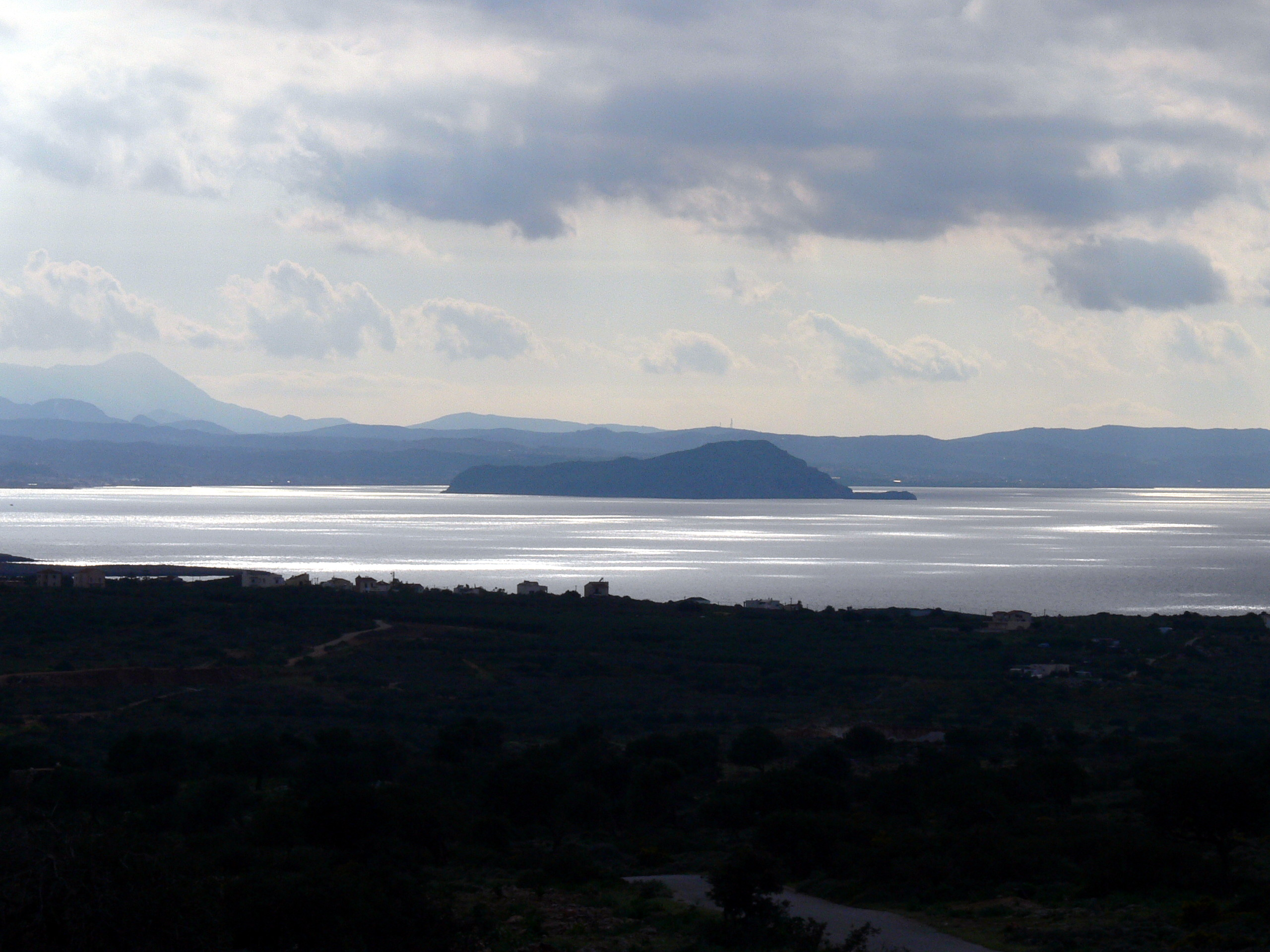

- Location within the regional unit

- Location within Greece
- Coordinates: 35°33′N 24°08′E
- Country: Greece
- Administrative region: Crete
- Regional unit: Chania
- Municipality: Chania

Area
  - Municipal unit: 112.6 km^{2} (43.5 sq mi)

Population (2021)
  - Municipal unit: 14,111
  - Municipal unit density: 125.3/km^{2} (324.6/sq mi)
- Time zone: UTC+2 (EET)
  - Summer (DST): UTC+3 (EEST)
- Vehicle registration: ΧΝ

Akrotiri (Greek: Ακρωτήρι, literally "promontory") is a peninsula and former municipality in the Chania regional unit, Crete, Greece. Since the 2011 local government reform it is part of the municipality Chania, of which it is a municipal unit. The municipal unit has an area of 112.644 km^{2} (43.492 sq mi). Its ancient name was Kiamon while the Byzantines called it Charaka. The largest town in the peninsula is Kounoupidiana. The beach at Stavros became famous because of the film Zorba the Greek.

== Geography and environment ==
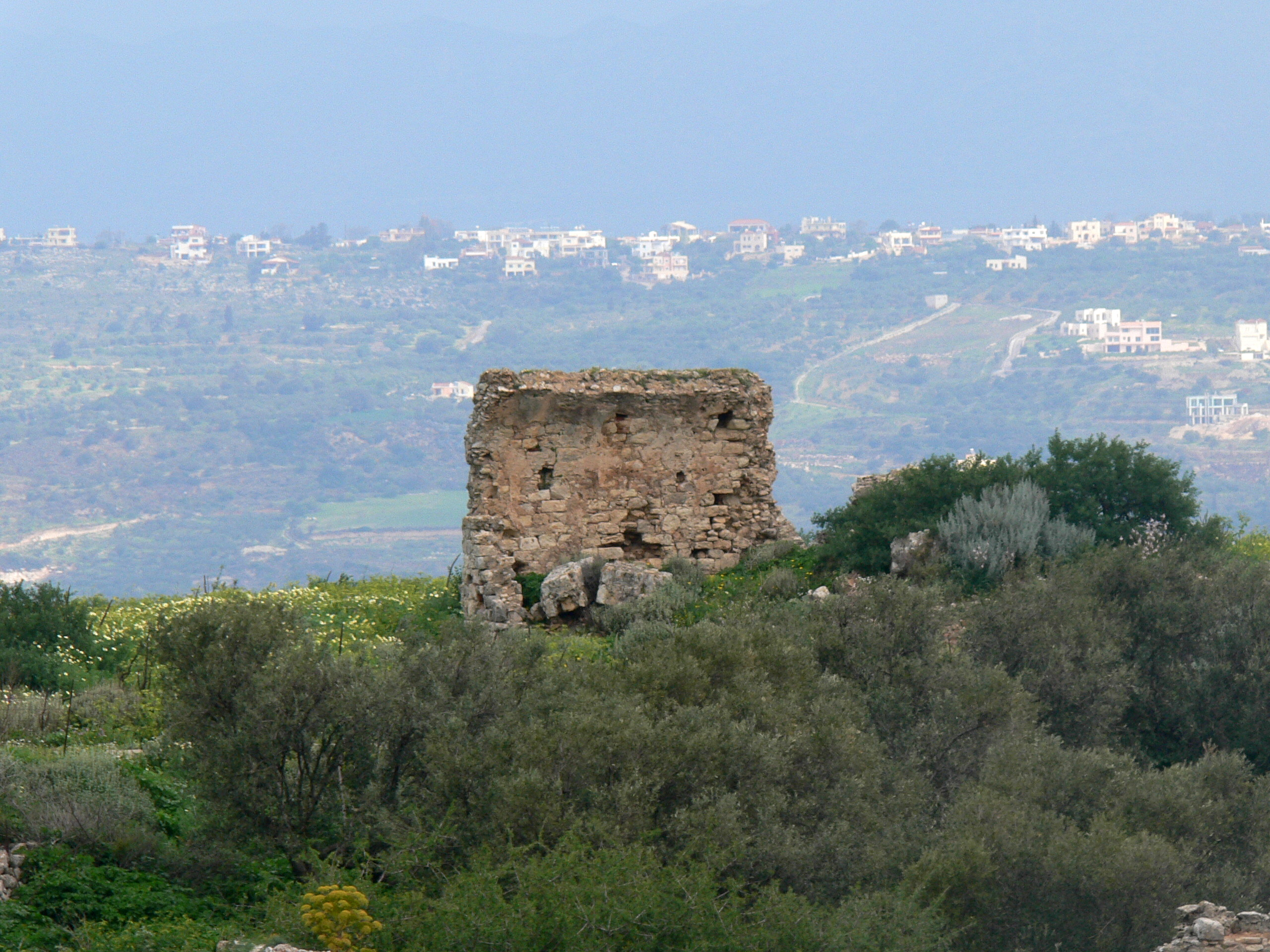
Aptera

Akrotiri is a rocky promontory on the northern side of the island of Crete, in the Sea of Crete. It is roughly circular in shape, connected to the rest of the island by a wide causeway between Chania and the town of Souda. To the south, Souda Bay is found between the peninsula and the island. Most of the peninsula is a plateau somewhat elevated from the sea. There is a string of hills along the northern coast with the highest peaks at Skloka mountain near Rizoskloko and Vardies mountain near Stavros. A variety of flora occur on the rocky promontory of Akrotiri including the herb Taraxacum minimum.

== History ==
The earliest history of the local area is related to the founding of the nearby ancient city of Kydonia, one of the most powerful cities of ancient Crete.

The tombs of Eleftherios Venizelos and his son Sophoklis are found on Akrotiri, at a site overlooking Chania. At this site, the Greek flag was raised in defiance of the Turks and the Great Powers, with the peninsula acting as a headquarters of the Cretan Revolution.

Three monasteries are found in the hills to the north. Aghia Triada dates from the 17th Century and was founded by two Venetian monks who had joined the Orthodox church, Jeremiah and Laurentio Giancarolo. These brothers renovated an older monastery endowed by the Mourtari family. The imposing buildings are visible across the plateau and from planes arriving at the airport and are set in olive and orange groves. A little way into the hills, accessible by car through a small gorge, is the Gouvernetos Monastery, 5 km north of Aghia Triada. Here the buildings appear fortress-like, with a large square building around a central courtyard, in which stands the church dedicated to the Virgin Mary.

== Sightseeing ==
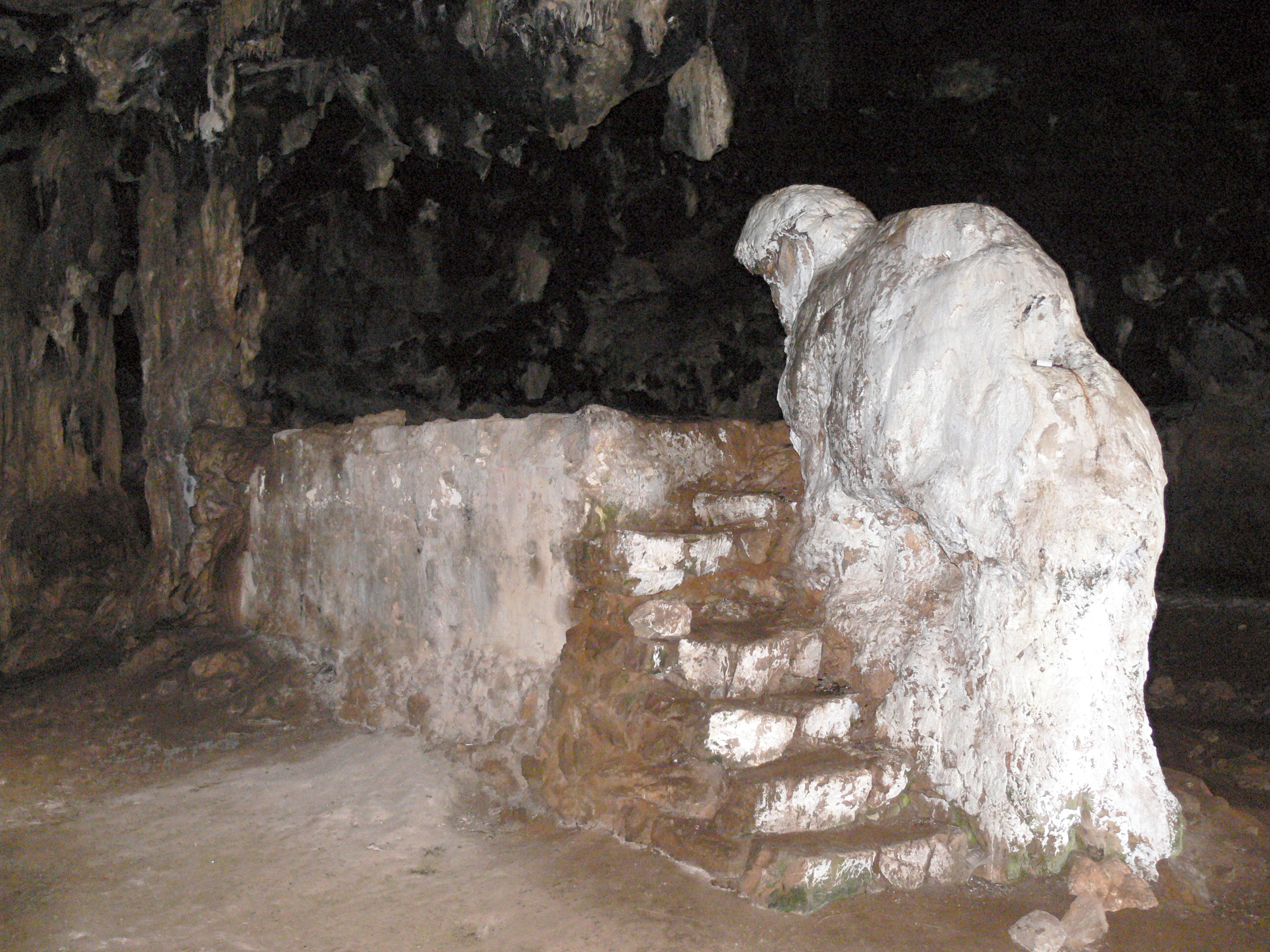
Arkoudiotissa Cave

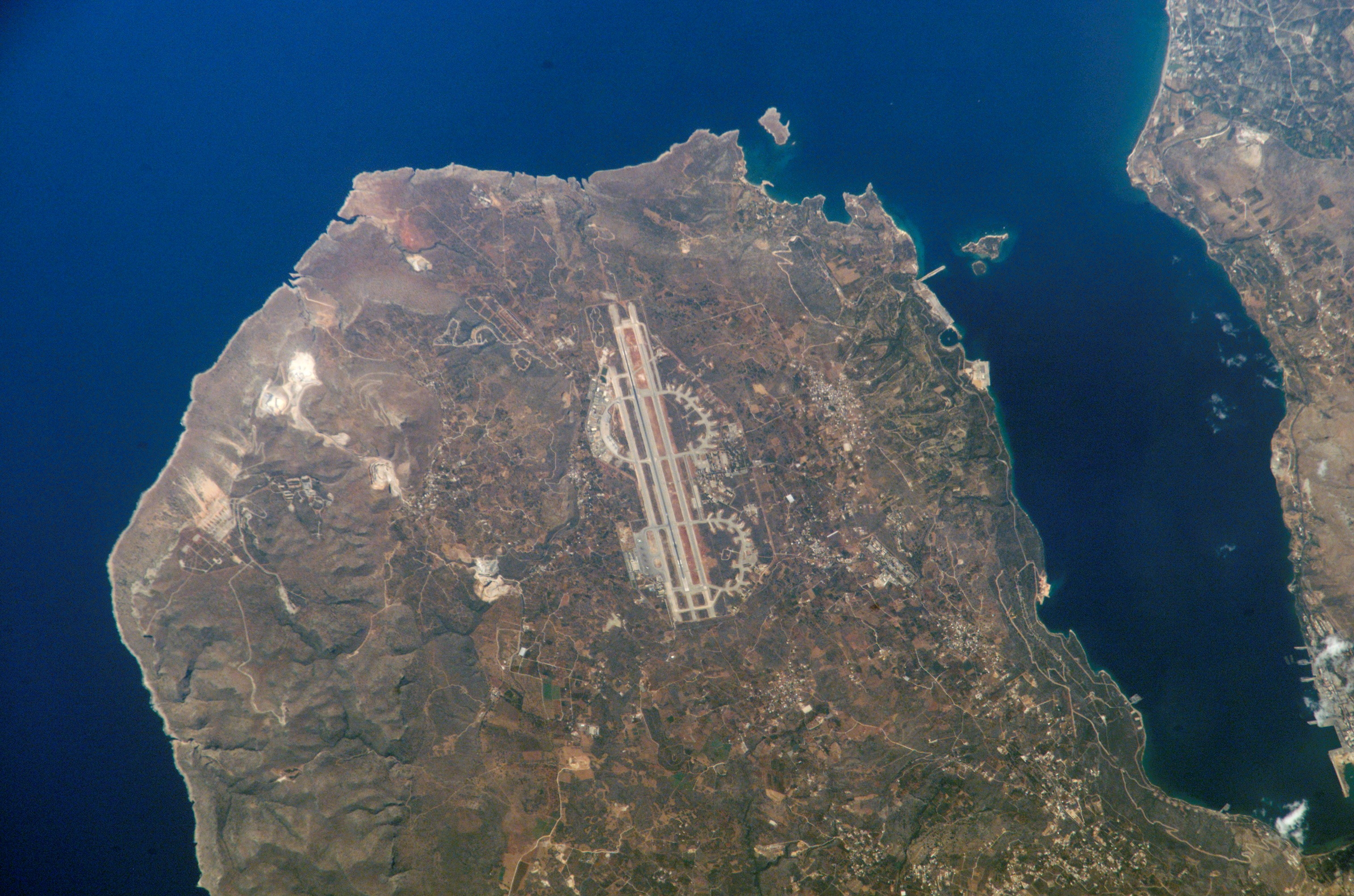
Satellite view of the Akrotiri peninsula. Chania Airport shown in centre

From Gouverneto Monastery, the path is only accessible by foot and leads to the cave of the Arkoudiotissa ("she-bear"), where a stalagmite is said to look like a bear. This cave is believed to have been used for worship since ancient times (as there is evidence for cults of Artemis and Apollo), but was dedicated to the Arkoudiotissa Panaghia (Our Lady) during the Christian era. Ascetics lived in the caves in the area. Further along the path, after a descent of 140 steps, is the Katholikon (monastic church), the third monastery, now abandoned. It is believed to date from the 5th or 6th Century, founded by St John the Hermit. It is built into the cliff, with a unique church largely carved into the rock-face. This striking set of buildings is now overgrown with fig trees but retains significant charm.

Chania's airport, Chania/Ioannis Daskalogiannis International Airport (IATA: CHQ, ICAO:LGSA), named after folk-hero Daskalogiannis, is on the central plateau and is easily reached from Chania by car, taxi or public transport. There are several resorts around Akrotiri, including Stavros, Kalathas and Marathi.
