= Stavro =

Stavro is both a given name and surname. Notable people with the name include:

- Stavro Jabra (1947–2017), Lebanese cartoonist and illustrator
- Stavro Skëndi (1905–1989), Albanian-American linguist and historian
- Astrid Stavro (born 1972), Italian graphic designer based in Barcelona
- Stavri Stavro (1885–1955), Albanian diplomat to Yugoslavia and Greece
- Steve Stavro (1926–2006), Macedonian-Canadian businessman and grocery store magnate

== See also ==
- Stavros (disambiguation)
- Ernst Stavro Blofeld
