= Venetian architecture =

Venetian architecture refers to the architecture of Venice and the territory it controlled, or revival architecture imitating it. It may refer to:

- Venetian Gothic architecture
- Venetian Renaissance architecture
- Venetian revival architecture, most often copying Venetian Gothic.
- Palladian architecture
