= Stavros, Chania =

Town on the island of Crete, Greece

Coordinates: 35.588°N 24.091°E

Stavros (Greek: Σταυρός, Stavrós) is a village and beach in the Akrotiri district of the city of Chania, Crete, Greece and had a population of 543 (2021). It is part of the community Kounoupidiana. The beach was the location where in 1964 Michael Cacoyannis filmed the famous beach dancing scene in the movie Zorba the Greek with Anthony Quinn.

Akrotiri district

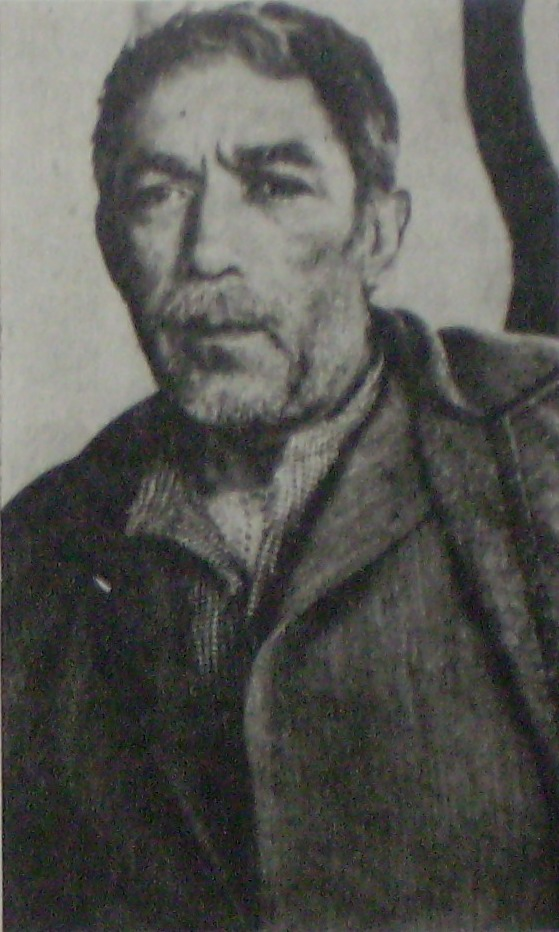
Anthony Quinn as Zorba
