= Nicos Stavrou =

Cypriot footballer (born 1971)

Personal information
- Date of birth: 2 April 1971 (age 55)
- Position: Defender

Senior career*
Years	Team	Apps	(Gls)
1992–2004	Olympiakos Nicosia		
2004–2006	Enosis Neon THOI Lakatamia		

International career
2001	Cyprus	1	(0)
- * Club domestic league appearances and goals

Nicos Stavrou (born 2 April 1971) is a retired Cypriot football defender.
