= Paraskevi =

Paraskevi may refer to:

== People ==
Paraskevi (Greek: Παρασκευή) is a Greek feminine given name. It is the feminine form of Paraskevas. Diminutive forms include Voula (Greek: Βούλα) and Evi (Greek: Εύη). The name comes from the Greek paraskeuḗ (Greek: πᾰρᾰσκευή), meaning "to prepare," a reference to Parasceve, the day of preparation before the Sabbath.

- List of saints named Paraskevi
- Parashqevi Qiriazi (1880–1970), Albanian teacher
- Paraskevi "Voula" Zouboulaki (1924–2015), Egyptian-Greek actress
- Paraskevi "Evi" Christofilopoulou (born 1956), Greek politician
- Paraskevi "Voula" Patoulidou (born 1965), Greek hurdler and long jumper
- Paraskevi Tsiamita (born 1972), Greek athlete and jumper
- Paraskevi Papachristou (born 1989), Greek athlete

== Places in Greece ==
- Paraskevi, Achaea, a village in Achaea
- Paraskevi, Grevena, a village in Grevena

== See also ==
- List of saints named Paraskevi
- Agia Paraskevi (disambiguation), for places and churches in Greece
- Sveta Petka (disambiguation), Bulgarian, Macedonian and Serbian name for Parascheva of the Balkans
- Paraskevas (given name)
- Paraskevas (surname)
- Praskovya
- Paraskeva
