= Paraskevas =

Paraskevas is a Greek name, see:

- Paraskevas (given name)
- Paraskevas (surname)
