= Sveta Petka =

Sveta Petka (Sv. Petka) is the Bulgarian, Serbian and Macedonian name for Saint Parascheva of the Balkans, which may refer to:

== Villages ==
- Sveta Petka, Bujanovac, Serbia
- Sveta Petka, Sopište, North Macedonia
- Sveta Petka, Velingrad, Bulgaria

== Church buildings ==
- A monastery in the village Brajčino in the North Macedonia
- Sveta Petka, Lenište in the abandoned village of Lenište, North Macedonia
- Chapel of Saint Petka in Belgrade, Serbia
- Saint Petka Church (Lakeshore, Ontario)
- Church of St. Petka in Staničenje, Serbia
- Church of St Petka of the Saddlers, Sofia, Bulgaria
- Church of the Holy Venerable Mother Parascheva, Croatia
