= Paraskeva =

Paraskeva is a Slavic feminine given name, a variant of Paraskevi (Greek: Παρασκευή). It is also a Greek surname. Colloquial diminutives: Paraska, Parasha. Notable people with the name include:

== Given name ==
- Paraskeva of the Balkans, 10th-century ascetic female saint
- Paraskeva Clark, Canadian painter
- Paraskeva Diveyevskaya, Russian wanderer and nun

=== Mythology ===
- Paraskeva Friday

== Surname ==
- Janet Paraskeva (born 1946), British government official
- João Paraskeva
- Loukas Paraskeva, Cypriot lawn bowler
- Mary Paraskeva (1882–1951), Greek amateur photographer

== See also ==
- Praskovya
- MissParaskeva, stage name of Pasha Pozdniakova (born 1999), Finnish-Russian model, entrepreneur and social media influencer
