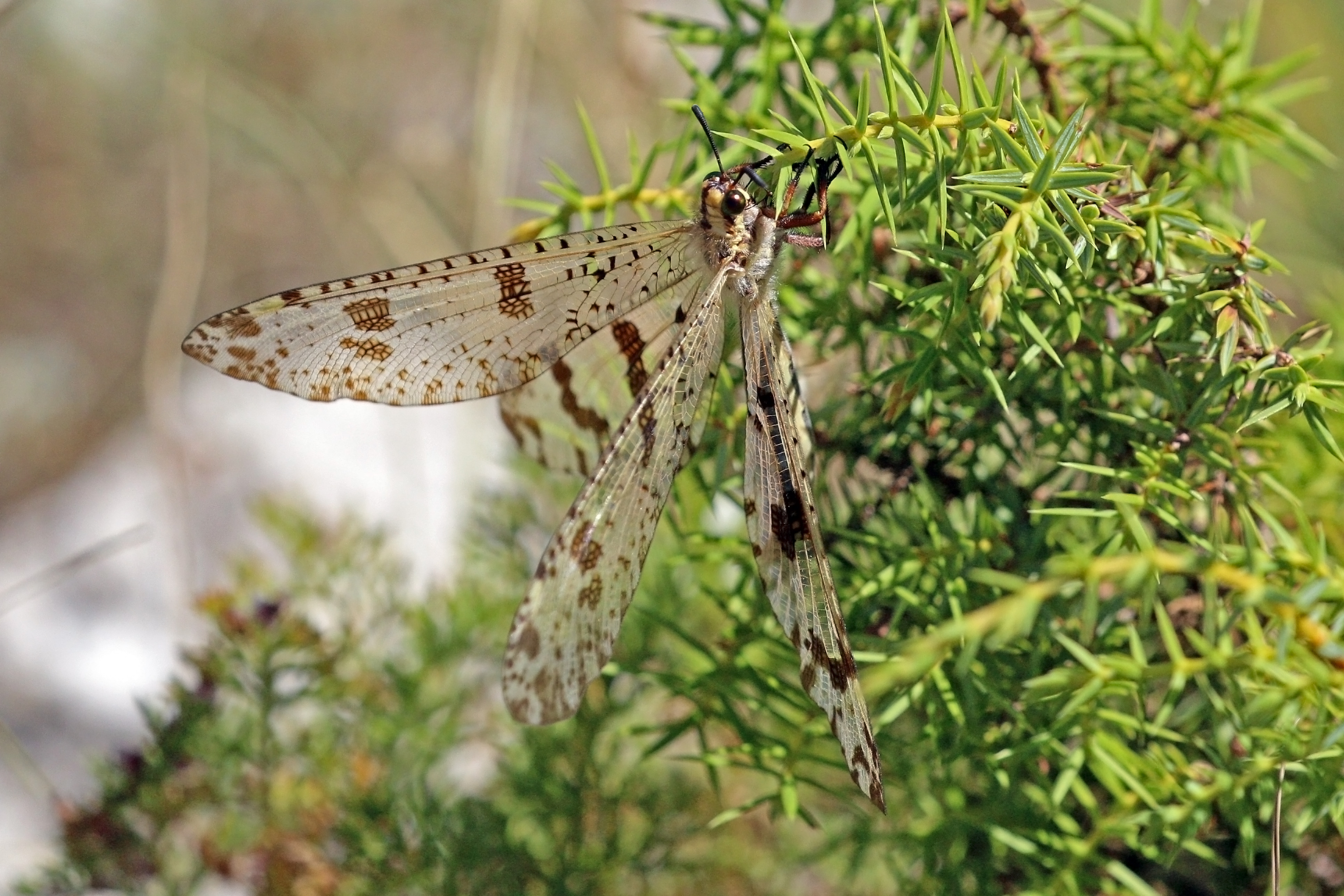
- Pletvar, North Macedonia

Scientific classification
- Kingdom: Animalia
- Phylum: Arthropoda
- Class: Insecta
- Order: Neuroptera
- Family: Ascalaphidae
- Genus: Palpares
- Species: P. libelluloides

Binomial name
- Palpares libelluloides (Linnaeus, 1764)

Synonyms
- Myrmeleon libelluloides (Linnaeus, 1764); Myrmeleon libelluloides nigriventris Costa, 1855; Myrmeleon nordmanni Kolenati, 1846; Palpares chrysopterus Navas, 1910; Palpares libelluloides nigripes Navas, 1912; Hemerobius libelluloides Linnaeus, 1764

= Palpares libelluloides =

Species of insect

Palpares libelluloides is a species of antlion in the genus Palpares belonging to the family Myrmeleontidae . It is found across Southern Europe.

== Description ==
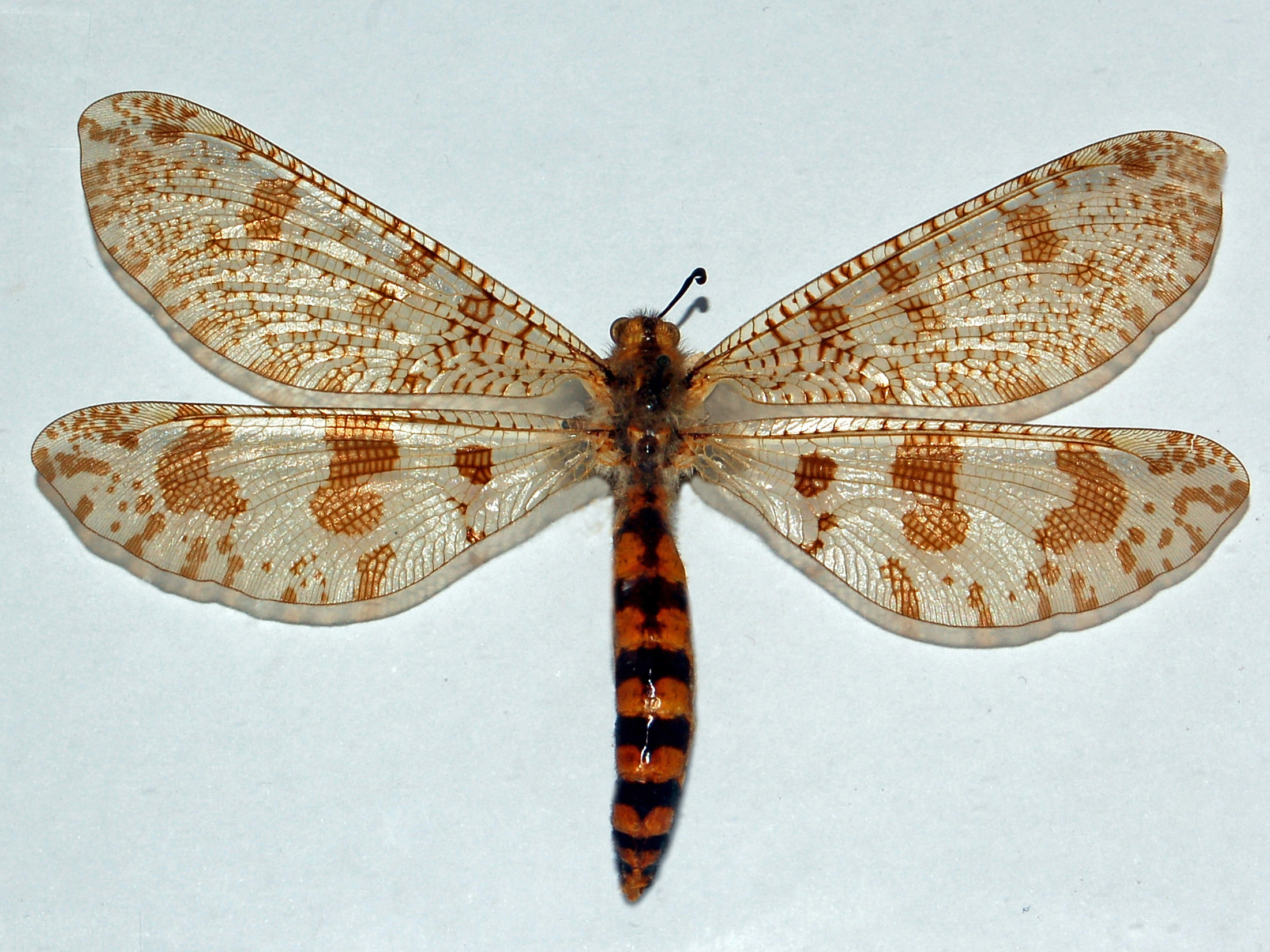
Mounted

Palpares libelluloides has a relatively large wingspan of more than 10 centimetres (3.9 in). The very broad wings are mottled dark brown. The males can be recognized by their long, delicate genital appendages.

The day-and night-active imagos can be observed from May to September. Their flight is usually short and close to the ground.

The specific name libelluloides means "dragonfly-like" (cf the dragonfly genus Libellula).

== Distribution ==
This species is widespread in the Mediterranean regions and it is mainly present in Albania, Bulgaria, France, Greece, Hungary, Italy, Romania, Spain and Turkey. It can be found in thickets and rocky slopes up to about 1000 meters above sea level.
