= Praskovya =

Praskovya or Praskovia (Russian: Прасковья) is an old Russian feminine given name. It derives from the Greek female name Paraskeve, meaning "preparation" or "Friday" (Friday being the day of preparation), the name of a martyred 2nd-century saint.

It may refer to

- Tsarevna Praskovya Ivanovna of Russia (1694–1731)
- Praskovya Bruce (1729–1785), Russian lady-in-waiting and noble
- Praskovya Ivanovskaya (1852–1935), Russian revolutionary
- Praskovia Kovalyova-Zhemchugova (1768–1803), Russian serf actress and soprano opera singer
- Praskovia Saltykova (1664–1723), Russian tsaritsa
- Praskovya Uvarova (1840–1924), Russian archaeologist

== See also ==
- Paraskeva
- Paraska
