= Voula (given name) =

- Gender: Female
- Language: Greek
- Name day: 26 July

Origin
- Region of origin: Greece

Other names
- Related names: Paraskevi

Voula (Greek: Βούλα) is a Greek feminine given name, often a diminutive of the given name Paraskevi.

Notable people bearing the name Voula include:

- Voula Damianakou (1914–2016), Greek author, translator and member of the Greek resistance against Nazi Germany
- Voula Papachristou (born 1989), Greek triple jumper and long jumper
- Voula Papaioannou (1898–1990), Greek photographer
- Voula Patoulidou (born 1965), Greek track and field athlete
- Voula Zouboulaki (1924–2015), Greek actress
