= Belava =

Mountain in Serbia

Belava Белава
- Location within Serbia

Highest point
- Elevation: 946 m (3,104 ft)
- Coordinates: 43°11′38″N 22°28′37″E

Geography
- Location: Southeastern Serbia
- Parent range: Balkan Mountains

Belava (Serbian Cyrillic: Белава) is a mountain in eastern Serbia on the outskirts of the town of Pirot. Its highest peak Kardašica has an elevation of 946 meters above sea level. The historic Church of St. Petka is located at the base of the mountain in the village of Staničenje.

== See also ==
- List of mountains in Serbia
