= Katerina Nurdzhieva =

Macedonian partisan and activist

- Born: 18 October 1922; Gorna Dzhumaya, Bulgaria
- Died: 12 October 2018 (aged 95); Blagoevgrad, Bulgaria
- Movement: Communist resistance during WWII in Vardar Macedonia
- Awards: Honorary citizen of the town Delchevo

Katerina Nurdzhieva (Bulgarian: Катерина Трайкова Нурджиева; Macedonian: Катерина Трајкова Нурџиева) 18 October 1922 – 12 October 2018) was a fighter in the Communist resistance in Vardar Macedonia and a Macedonian national activist. She was an honorary citizen of the town Delčevo in the Republic of Macedonia. She considered herself and is known for being a Macedonian. In Bulgaria she is considered a Bulgarian.

== Biography ==
Nurdzhieva was born in Gorna Dzhumaja (today Blagoevgrad) in Bulgaria in 1922. She was the granddaughter of Gotse Delchev's first cousin. She finished school in 1943 and was sent as teacher in Štip, then under Bulgarian control. Because she was involved in a Communist conspiracy, she was detained and imprisoned in Štip and then deported on the Aegean island of Thassos, then also annexed by Bulgaria.

In the autumn of 1944, she participated in the battles for the liberation of Macedonia from the Germans, with the 12th Macedonian Brigade formed in the mid of September near Veles. After the communists took power over the area in November, she worked again as a teacher, and was later transferred to the Macedonian General Headquarters in Skopje. After a while she became Secretary of Metodija Andonov-Cento, by personal recommendation of Pavel Shatev.

After the arrest of Andonov-Cento in 1946, she was forced by the new Macedonian authorities to move back to Bulgaria, accused of being pro-Bulgarian. Nurdzhieva died in October 2018 at the age of 95.

== See also ==
- Macedonian nationalism
