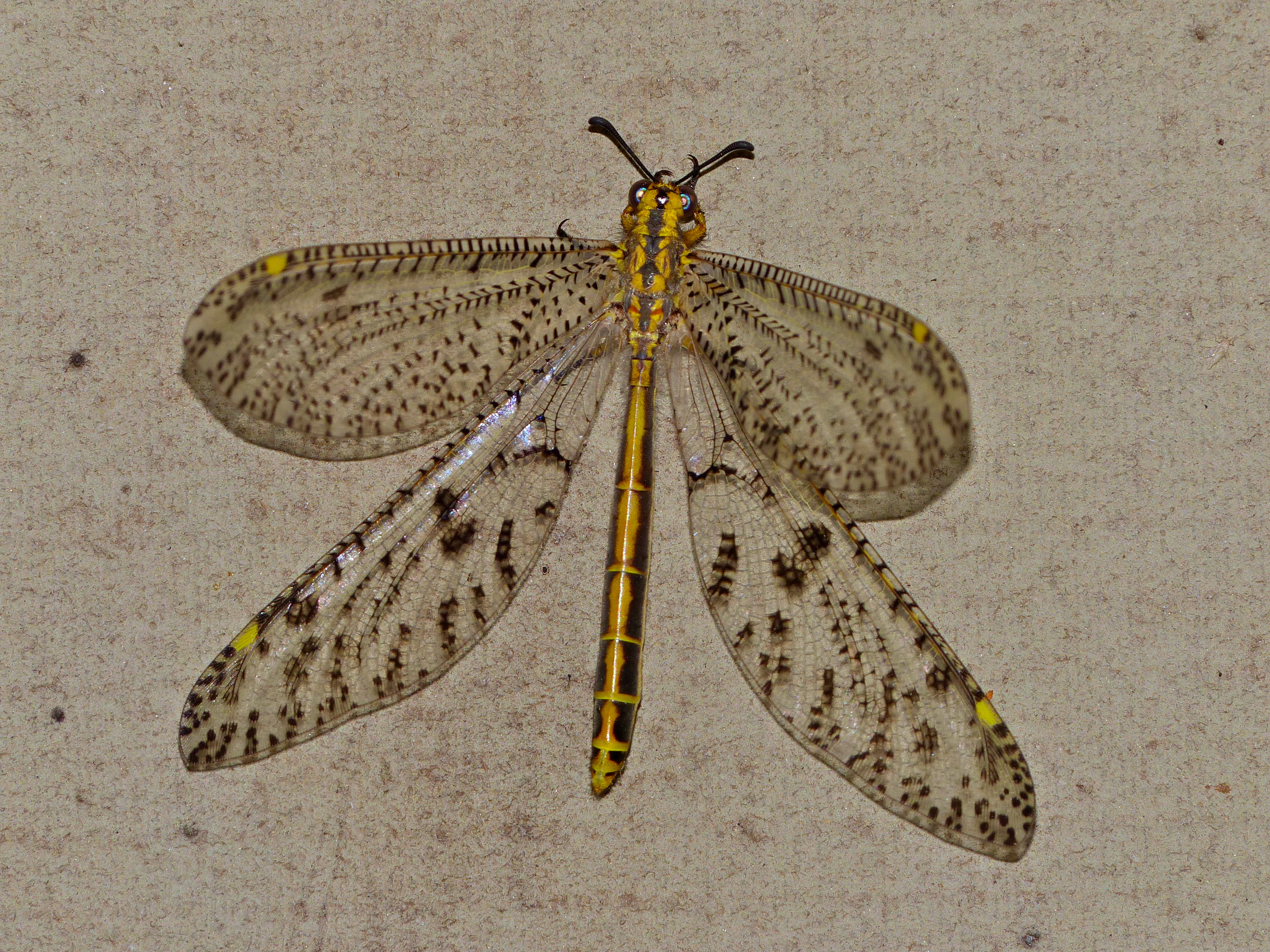
- Female

Scientific classification
- Domain: Eukaryota
- Kingdom: Animalia
- Phylum: Arthropoda
- Class: Insecta
- Order: Neuroptera
- Family: Ascalaphidae
- Genus: Palpares
- Species: P. sobrinus

Binomial name
- Palpares sobrinus (Péringuey, 1911)

Synonyms
- Nosa sobrina (Péringuey, 1911); Palparellus carpentieri (Navas, 1925); Palparellus sobrinus (Péringuey, 1911); Palpares carpentieri (Navas, 1925)

= Palpares sobrinus =

Species of insect

Palpares sobrinus is a species of antlion in the family Myrmeleontidae. It is found in southern Africa.

== Description ==
Palpares sobrinus is a relatively large antlion; wing length is about 5 cm. The very broad wings are mottled dark brown. Males have long appendages at the end of the abdomen.

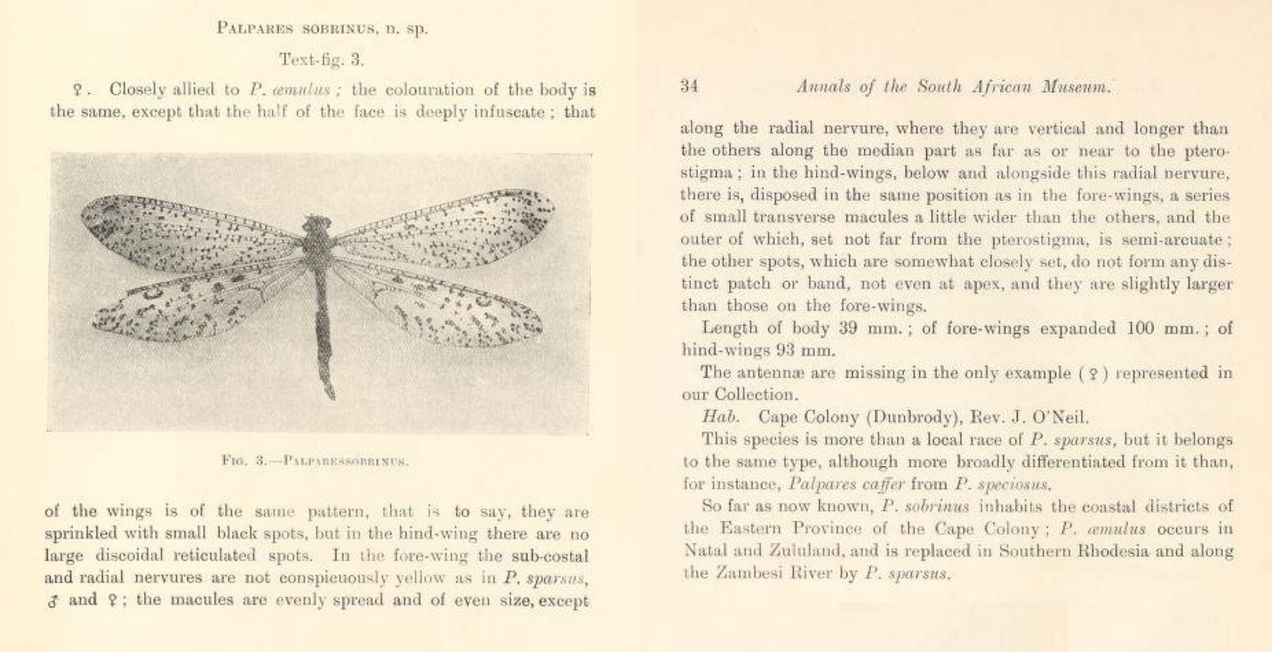
The original scientific description of Palpares sobrinus by Louis Péringuey.

== Distribution ==
This species is fairly common in grassland in north-eastern South Africa. It has also been recorded in Namibia, Botswana and Zimbabwe.

== Gallery ==
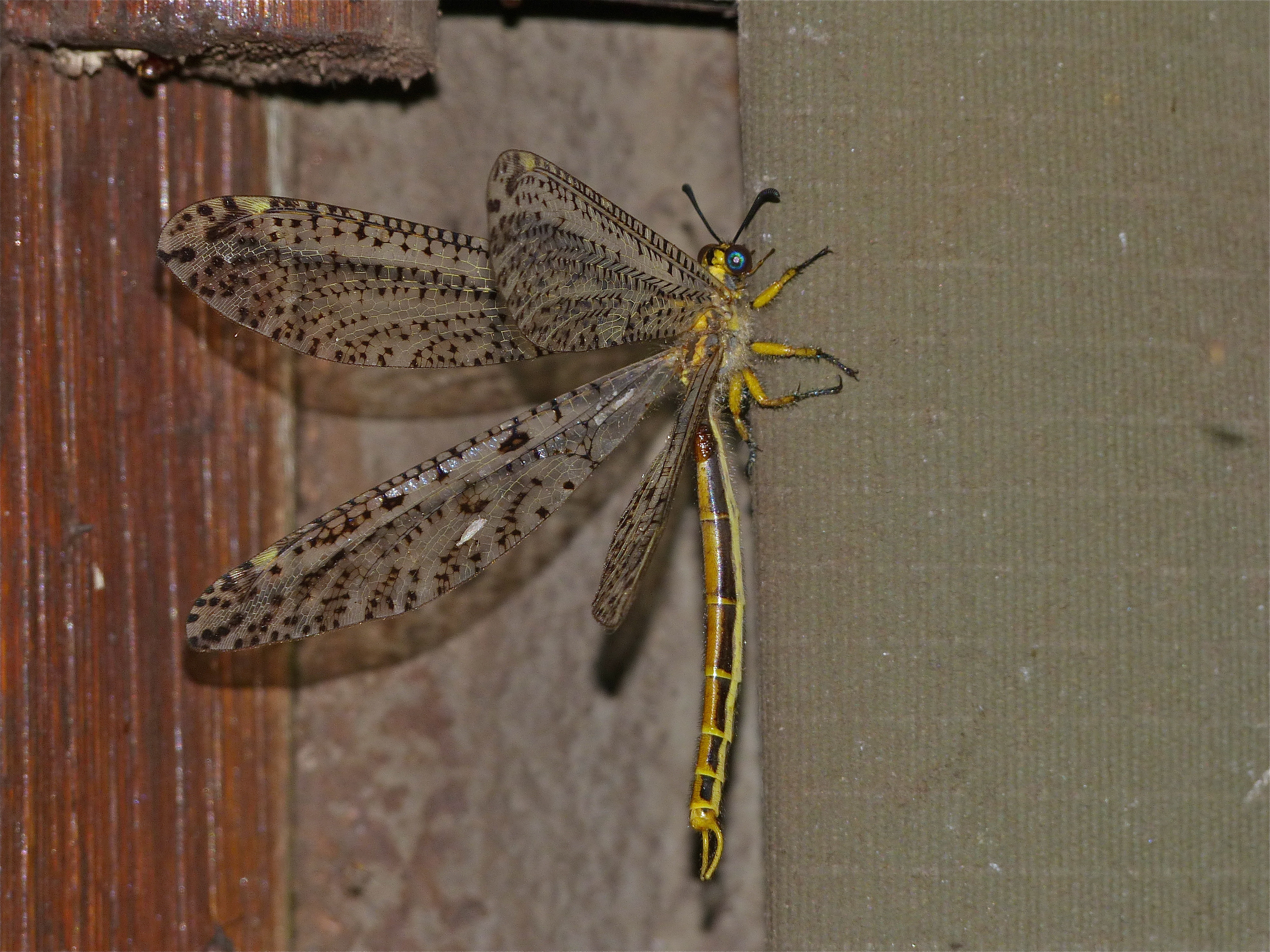
Male

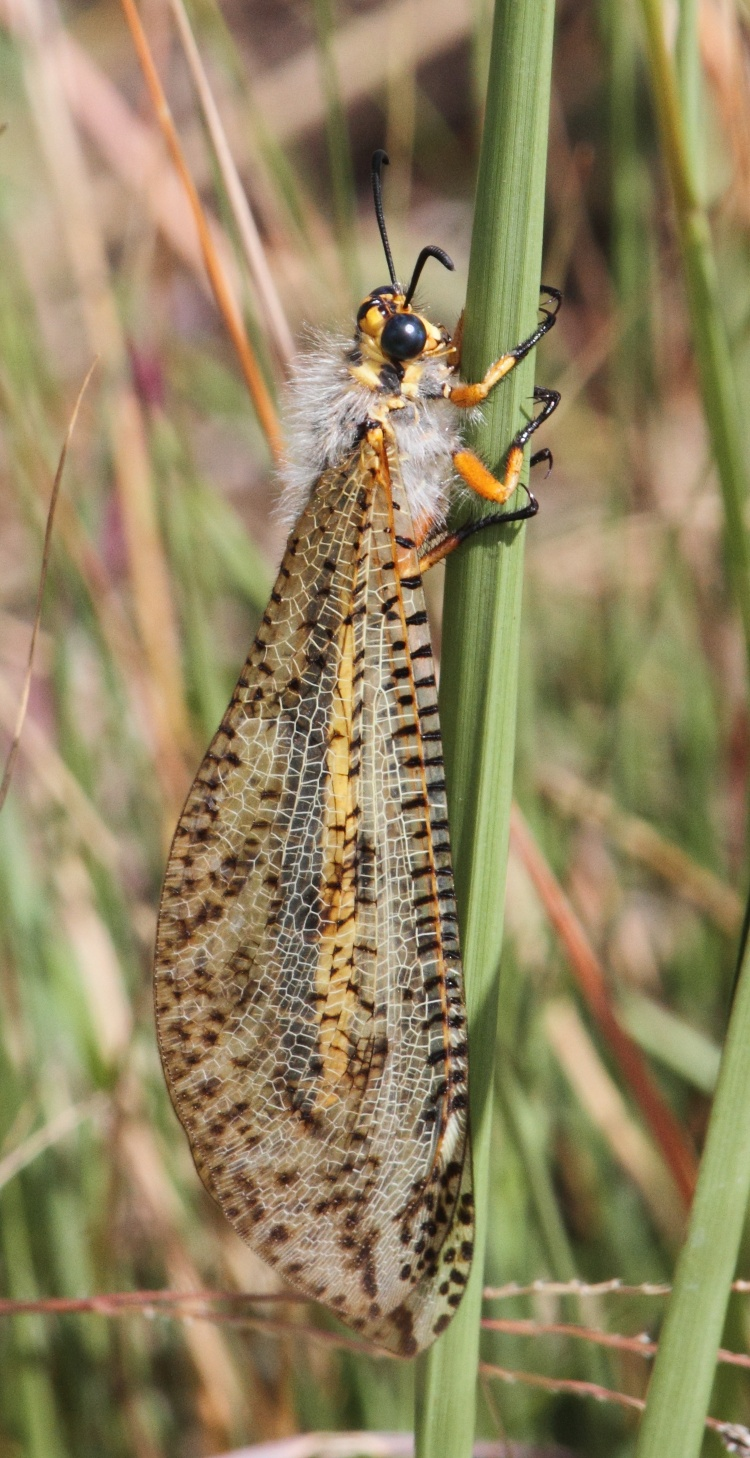

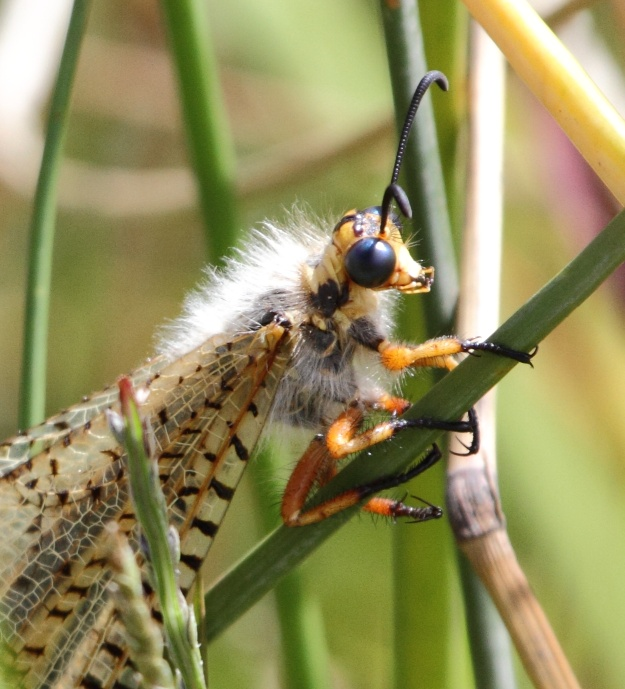
Detail of head and thorax

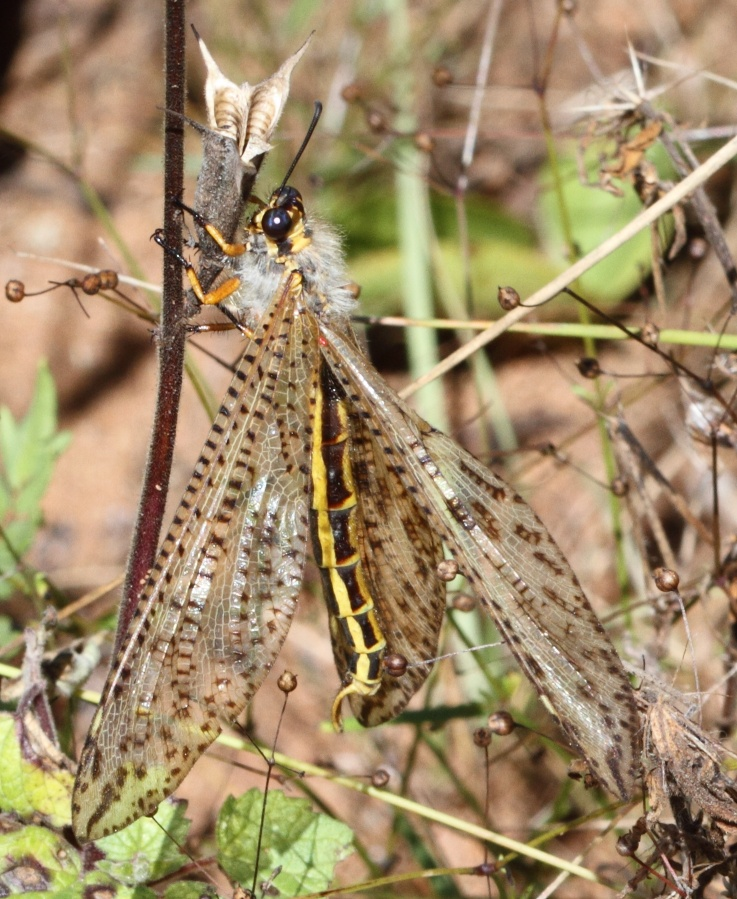
Male
