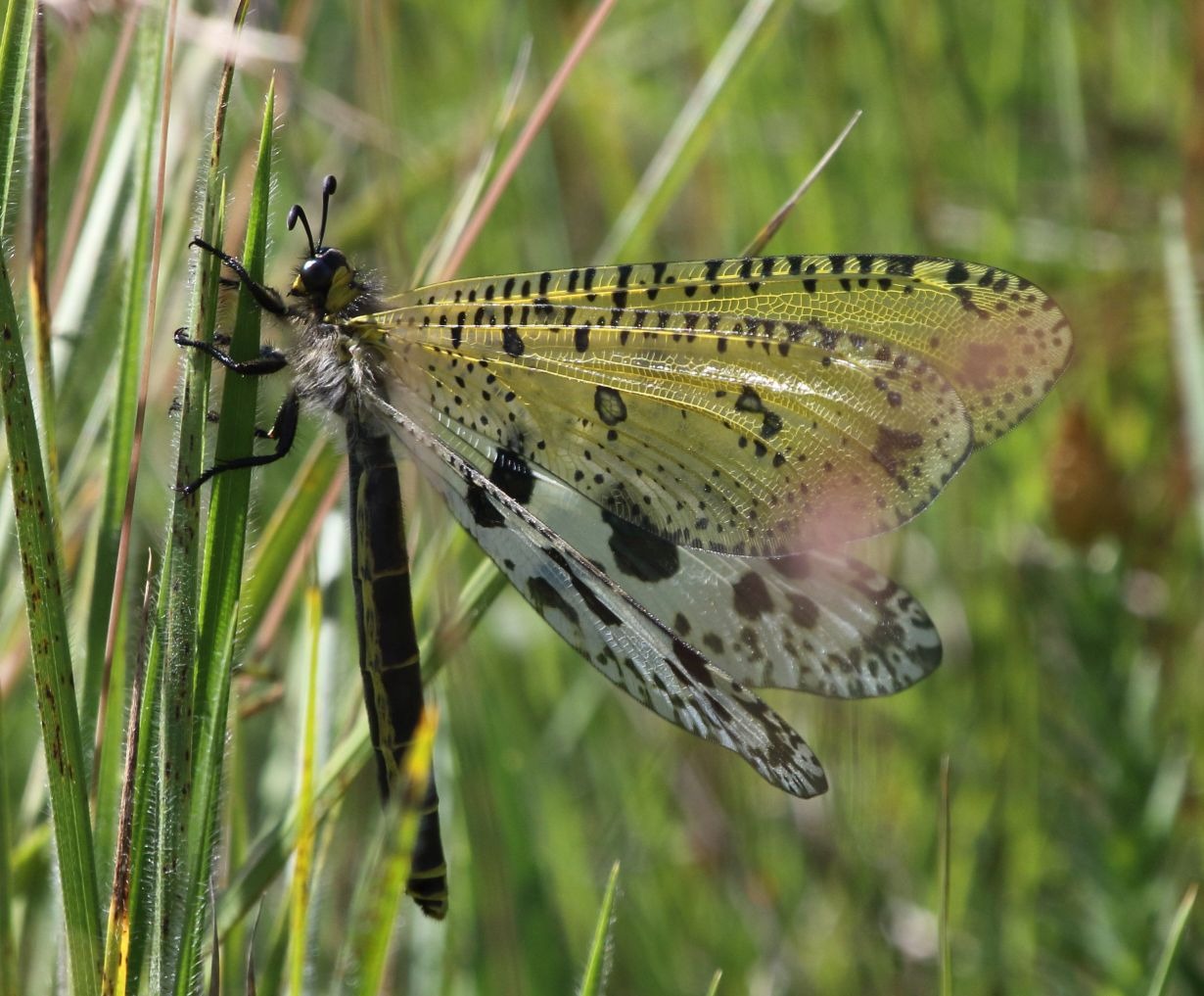

Scientific classification
- Kingdom: Animalia
- Phylum: Arthropoda
- Class: Insecta
- Order: Neuroptera
- Family: Ascalaphidae
- Genus: Palpares
- Species: P. caffer

Binomial name
- Palpares caffer (Burmeister, 1839)

Synonyms
- Myrmecoleon caffer; Myrmeleon caffer; Nosa caffer; Palparellus caffer; Palparellus varius; Palpares caffer audeoudi; Palpares caffer var. audeoudi; Palpares varius

= Palpares caffer =

Species of insect

Palpares caffer is a species of antlions in the family Myrmeleontidae, which is native to southern Africa. It was described by Hermann Burmeister in 1839.

== Description ==
Palpares caffer is a relatively large antlion with a wing length of about 5 cm.

== Distribution ==
This species occurs in South Africa from the Eastern Cape (Grahamstown area) northwards to Limpopo province. It has also been recorded in Namibia and Mozambique.

== Habitat ==
It is fairly common in high-altitude grassland from 1,000 to 2,000 m above sea level.

== Gallery ==
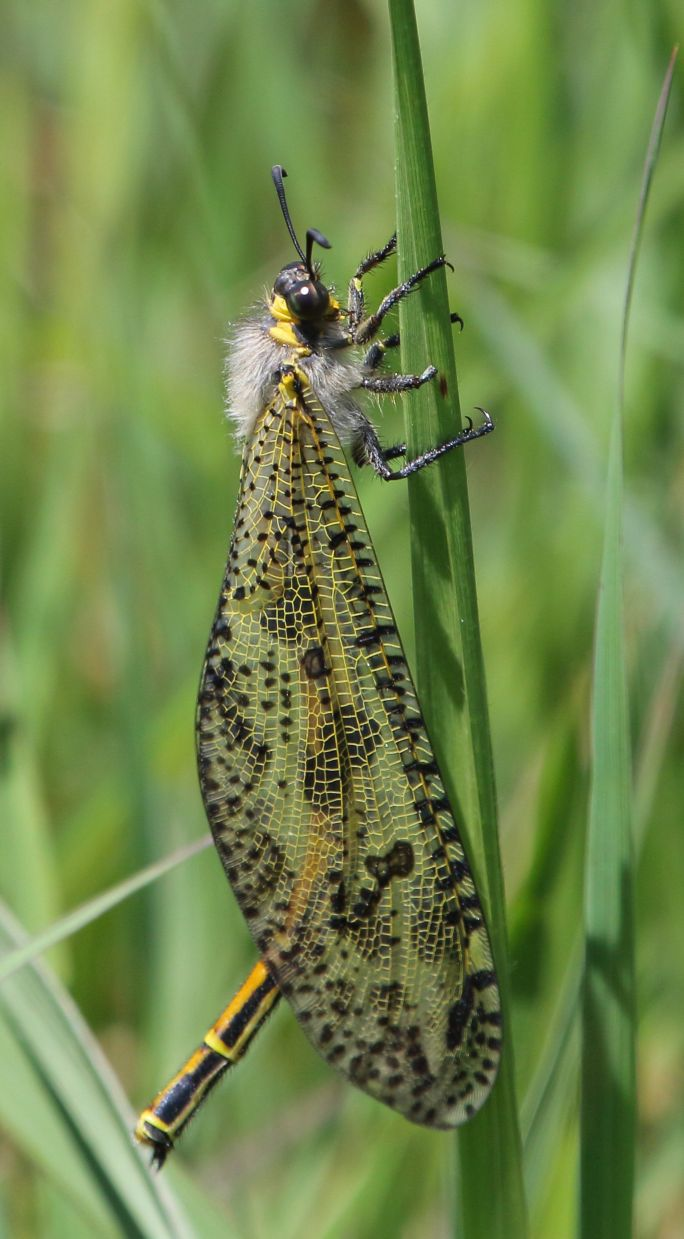
Male

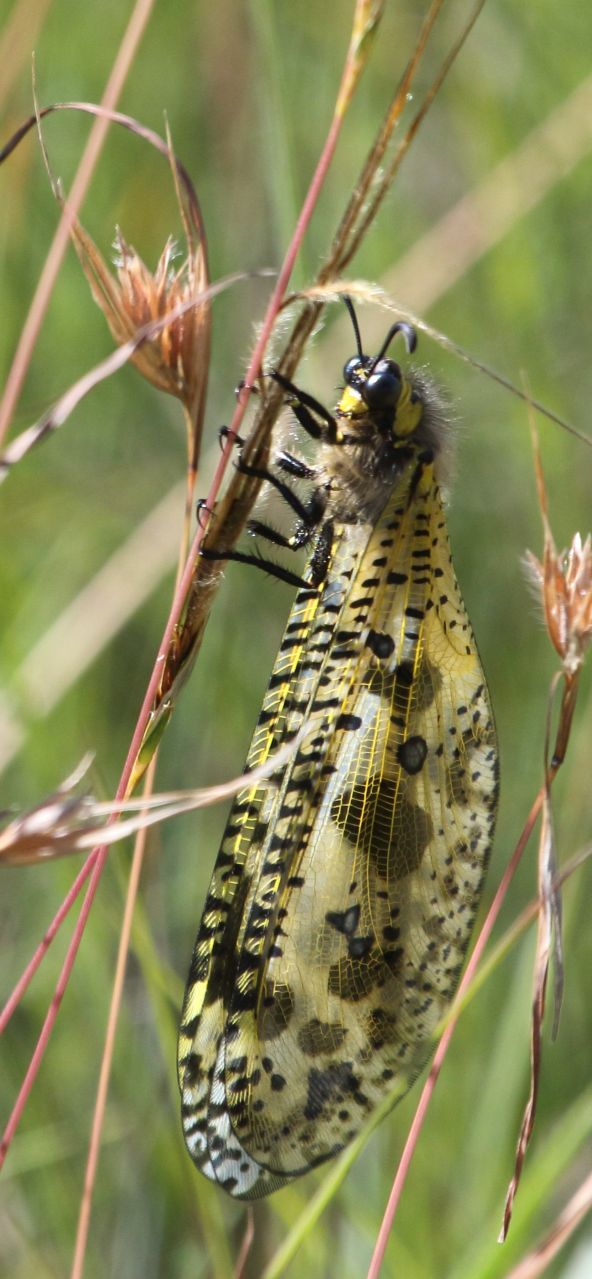
Female
