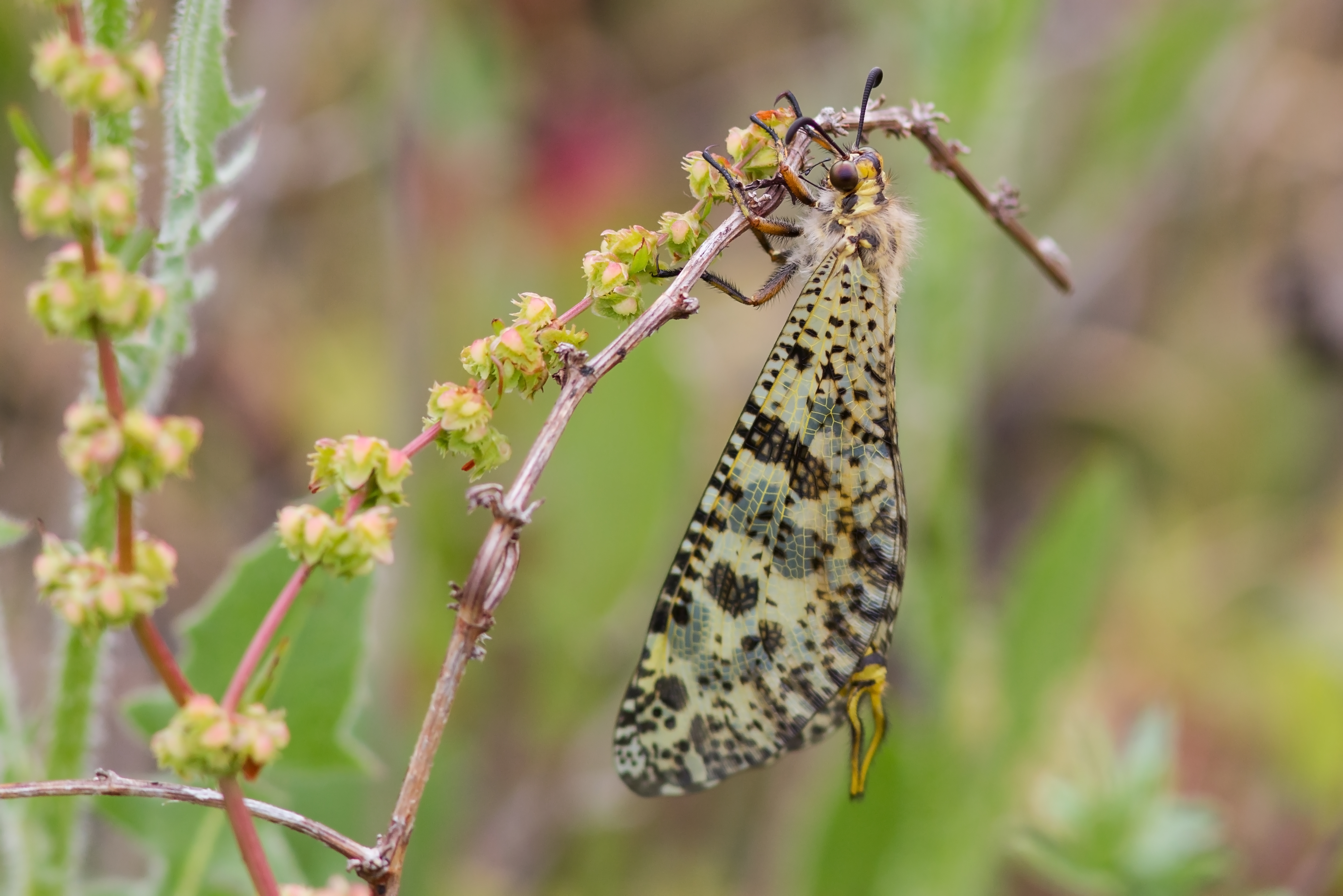
- Palpares libelluloides

Scientific classification
- Kingdom: Animalia
- Phylum: Arthropoda
- Class: Insecta
- Order: Neuroptera
- Family: Ascalaphidae
- Subfamily: Ascalaphinae
- Tribe: Palparini
- Genus: Palpares; Rambur, 1842

Species
- See text

= Palpares =

Genus of insects

Palpares is an antlion genus in the Myrmeleontidae family.

== Species ==
- Palpares abyssinicus
- Palpares aegrotus
- Palpares aeschnoides
- Palpares alexanderi
- Palpares alopecinus
- Palpares amitinus
- Palpares angustus
- Palpares apicatus
- Palpares arcangelii
- Palpares astarte
- Palpares auratus
- Palpares caffer
- Palpares campanai
- Palpares cataractae
- Palpares cephalotes
- Palpares chrysopterus
- Palpares cognatus
- Palpares contrarius
- Palpares digitatus
- Palpares elegantulus
- Palpares ertli
- Palpares fulvus
- Palpares geniculatus
- Palpares gratiosus
- Palpares hispanus
- Palpares immensus
- Palpares inclemens
- Palpares incommodus
- Palpares insularis
- Palpares kalahariensis
- Palpares lentus
- Palpares libelluloides
- Palpares nigrescens
- Palpares normalis
- Palpares nyicanus
- Palpares obscuripennis
- Palpares obsoletus
- Palpares papilionoides
- Palpares pardaloides
- Palpares pauliani
- Palpares percheronii
- Palpares radiatus
- Palpares rajasthanicus
- Palpares schoutedeni
- Palpares selysi
- Palpares sobrinus
- Palpares speciosus
- Palpares stuhlmanni
- Palpares submaculatus
- Palpares tigroides
- Palpares torridus
- Palpares trichogaster
- Palpares tristis
- Palpares umbrosus
- Palpares venustus
- Palpares weelei
- Palpares zebratus
- Palpares zebroides
