= Petar Traykov =

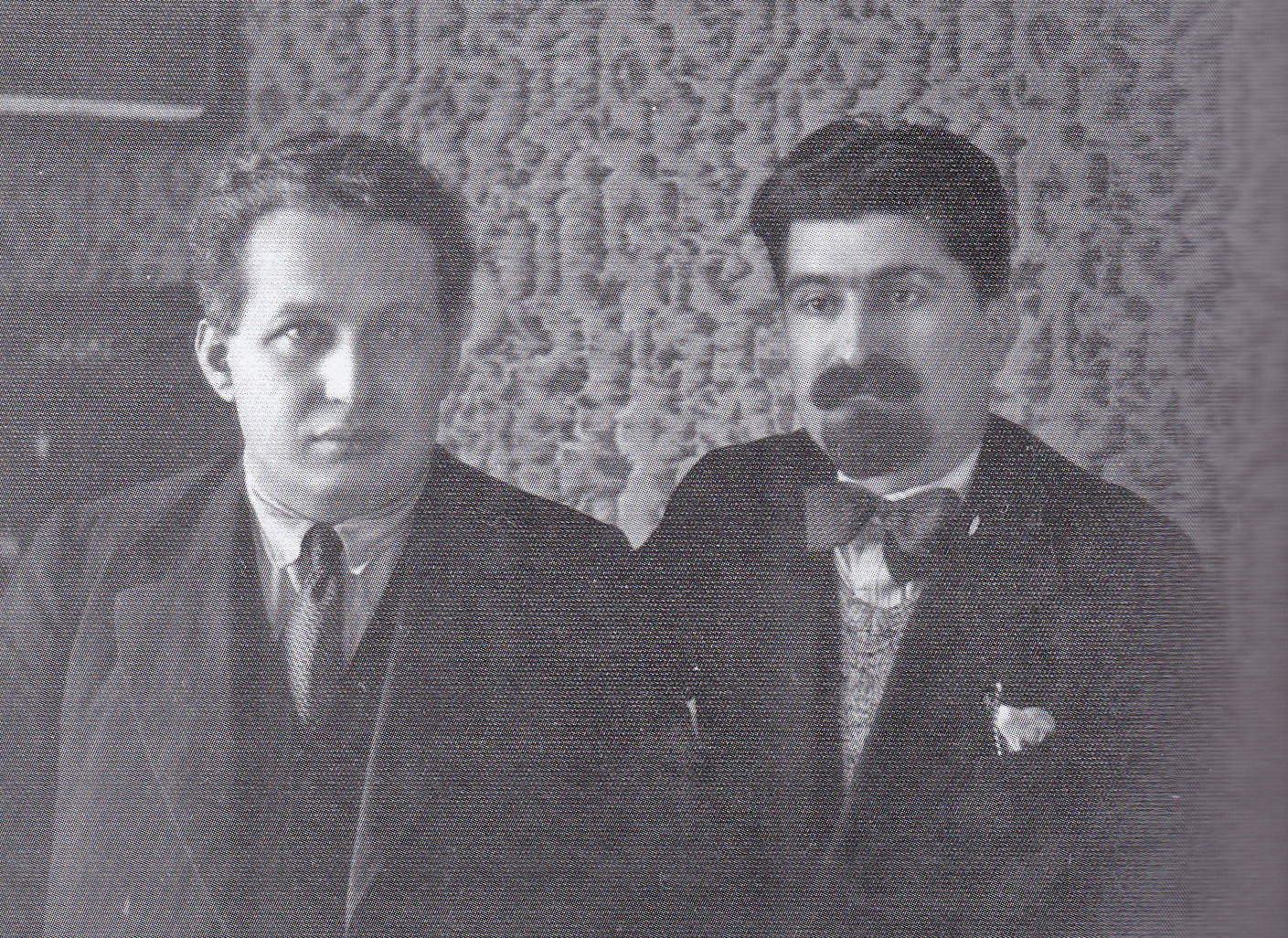
Petar Shandanov, leader of the leftist IMRO faction and Petar Traykov (right)

Petar Traykov Girovski was a Bulgarian Army officer, later activist of the Internal Macedonian Revolutionary Organization. Afterwards he became close to some communist circles and after the Second World War participated in Yugoslav and Bulgarian politics.

== Biography ==
Traykov was born on June 2, 1896, in Vrbeni, then in the Ottoman Empire, today Itea, Florina, in Greece. He is the brother of the Bulgarian politician Georgi Traykov. Traykov graduated from the Bulgarian High School in Bitola. After the Balkan Wars in 1913 he emigrated to Bulgaria and graduated from a military school in Sofia. During the First World War, Traykov served as an officer in the Bulgarian army. After the war he became a member of IMRO and operated since 1920 in Greece and Yugoslavia. Traykov carried out an assassination attempt in Florina, and was sentenced to death in Greece in 1925. He managed to escape to Albania, where in 1927 he was imprisoned. In 1928 he fled again and reached Bulgaria.

After the split in the IMRO after the assassination of Alexander Protogerov in 1928, he sided with the wing of the Protogerovists and opposed the policy of Ivan Mihailov. Subsequently, Traykov switched to the IMRO (United). He assisted then some Bulgarian Communist Party activists in their illegal activities. As result in 1935 he was arrested and interned in a labor camp. After the outbreak of World War II in 1940, he established contacts with British intelligence in Sofia. After the beginning of the operation of the Axis forces against Greece and Yugoslavia, he was arrested and interned again in a labor camp by the Bulgarian authorities (1941). Traykov was later sentenced to life in prison as a coworker the communist Emil Markov.

After the pro-Soviet 1944 Bulgarian coup d'état he was released from prison and became commander of the Gotse Delchev Brigade. Traykov took then part in operations against the Germans on Yugoslav territory. He received the rank of colonel in the Yugoslav communist army. On December 27, he was elected a member of ASNOM and participated in its second meeting. In early 1946, Traykov participated as one of the main prosecutorial witnesses in the trial in Skopje against the notable IMRO member Yordan Chkatrov and other Macedonian Bulgarian revolutionaries. After the rift between Tito and Stalin in 1948, he returned to Bulgaria. Traykov is the author of the book "The Nationalism of the Skopje Leaders", published in 1949 in Sofia, in which he criticizes the communist actions of de-Bulgarianization in Vardar Macedonia. He died on January 13, 1964, in Sofia.
