= Staničenje =

- Village
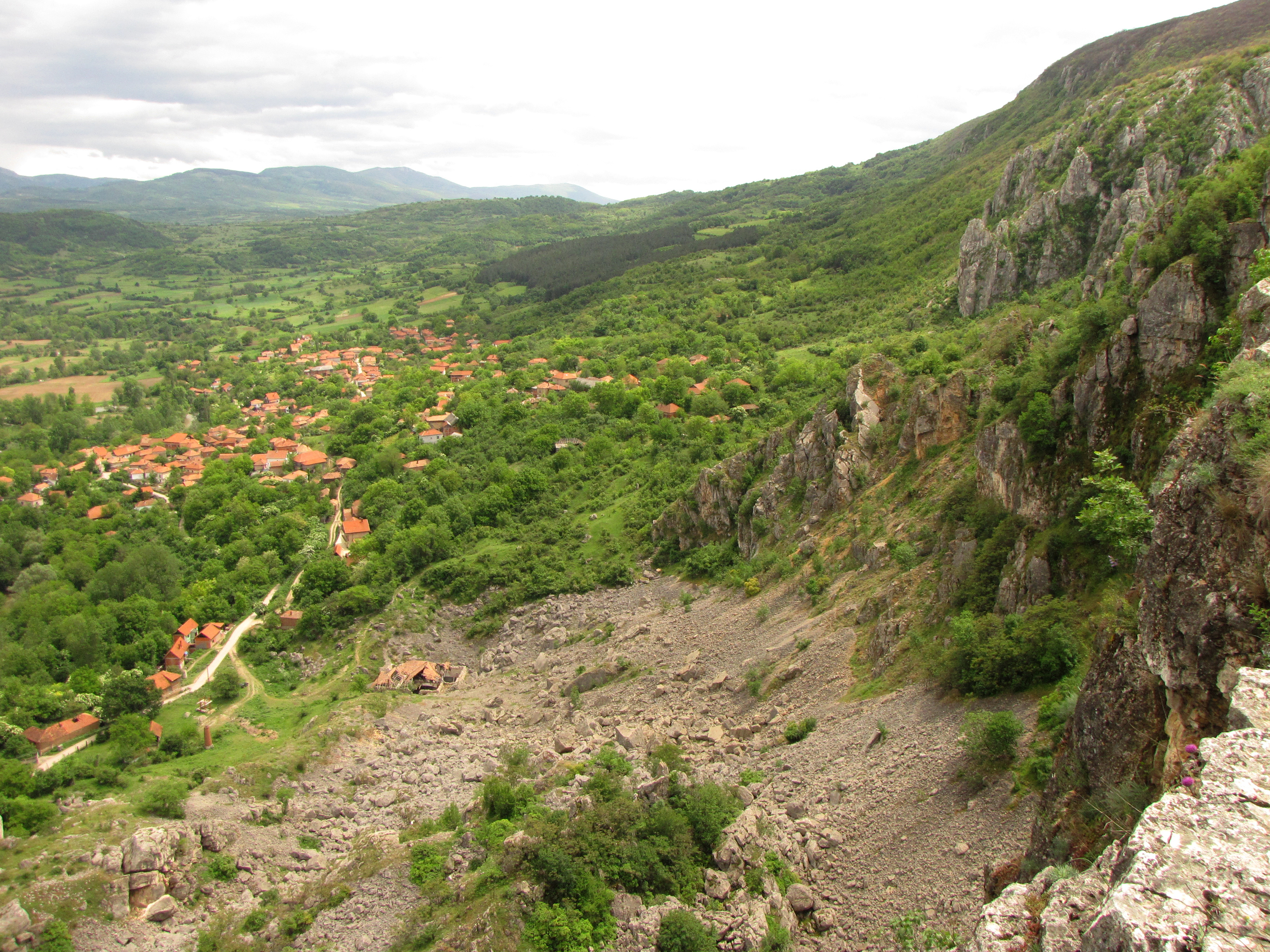
- Landscape view of Staničenje from an old stone quarry on Belava mountain

- Location within Serbia
- Coordinates: 43°12′11″N 22°30′29″E
- Country: Serbia
- Region: Southern and Eastern Serbia
- District: Pirot
- Municipality: Pirot

Population (2002)
  - Total: 609
- Time zone: UTC+1 (CET)
  - Summer (DST): UTC+2 (CEST)

Staničenje is a village in the municipality of Pirot, Serbia. At the 2002 census, the village had a population of 609 people. Two notable features in the village are St Petka's Church and the Bey's Bridge.
