= Lenište =

Lenište / Lenishte Лениште
- Village
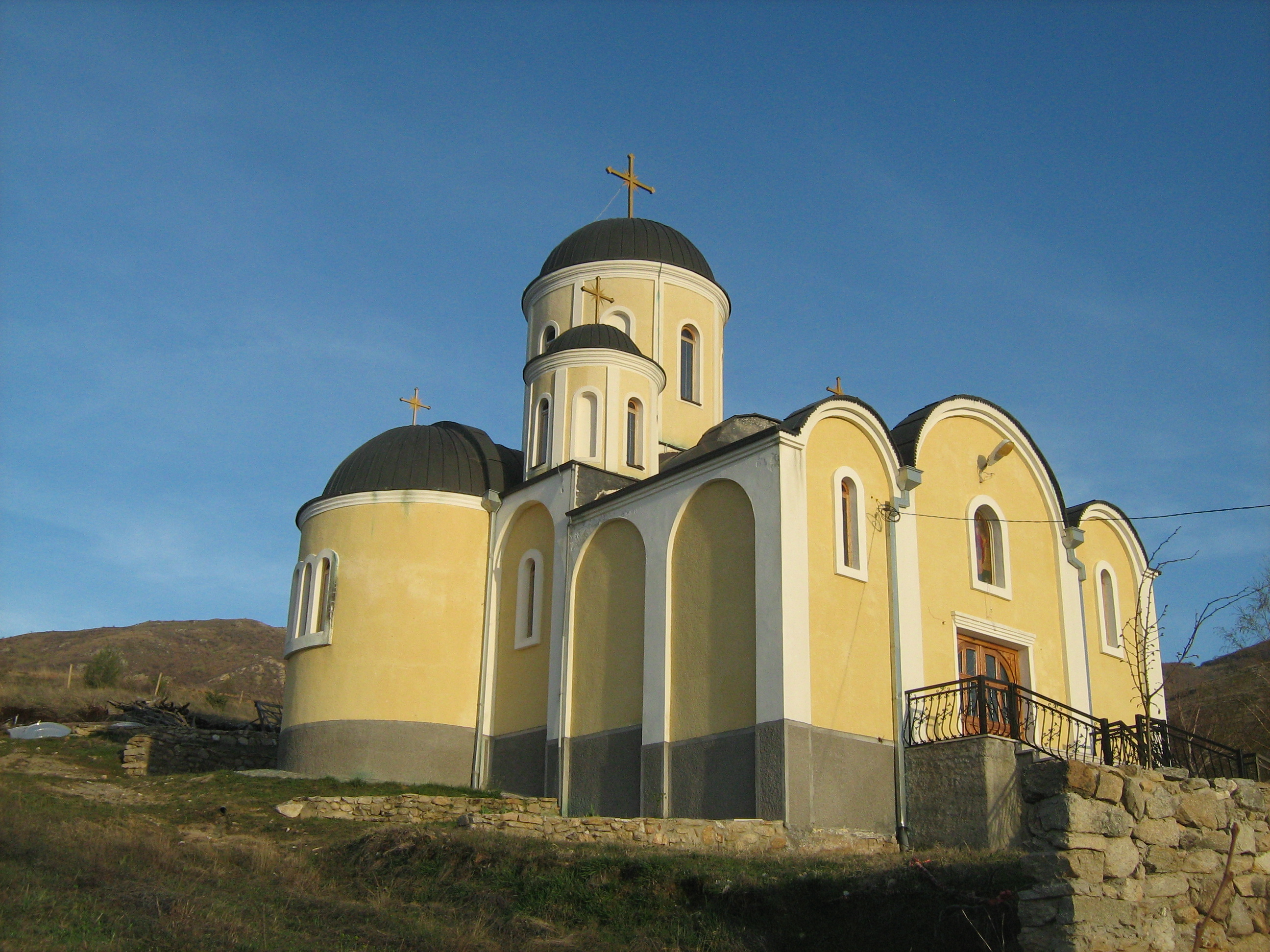
- Monastery's church St. Parascheva

- Location within North Macedonia
- Country: North Macedonia
- Municipality: Prilep
- Elevation: 965 m (3,166 ft)

Population (2021)
  - Total: 2
- Time zone: UTC+1 (CET)
- Postal code: 7500
- Area code: +38948

Lenište is a village in Municipality of Prilep in North Macedonia. The mother of Metodija Andonov-Čento an anti fascist fighter in World War II is from here.

As of the 2021 census, Lenište had 2 residents with the following ethnic composition:

- Macedonians 2
