= Gotse Delchev Brigade =

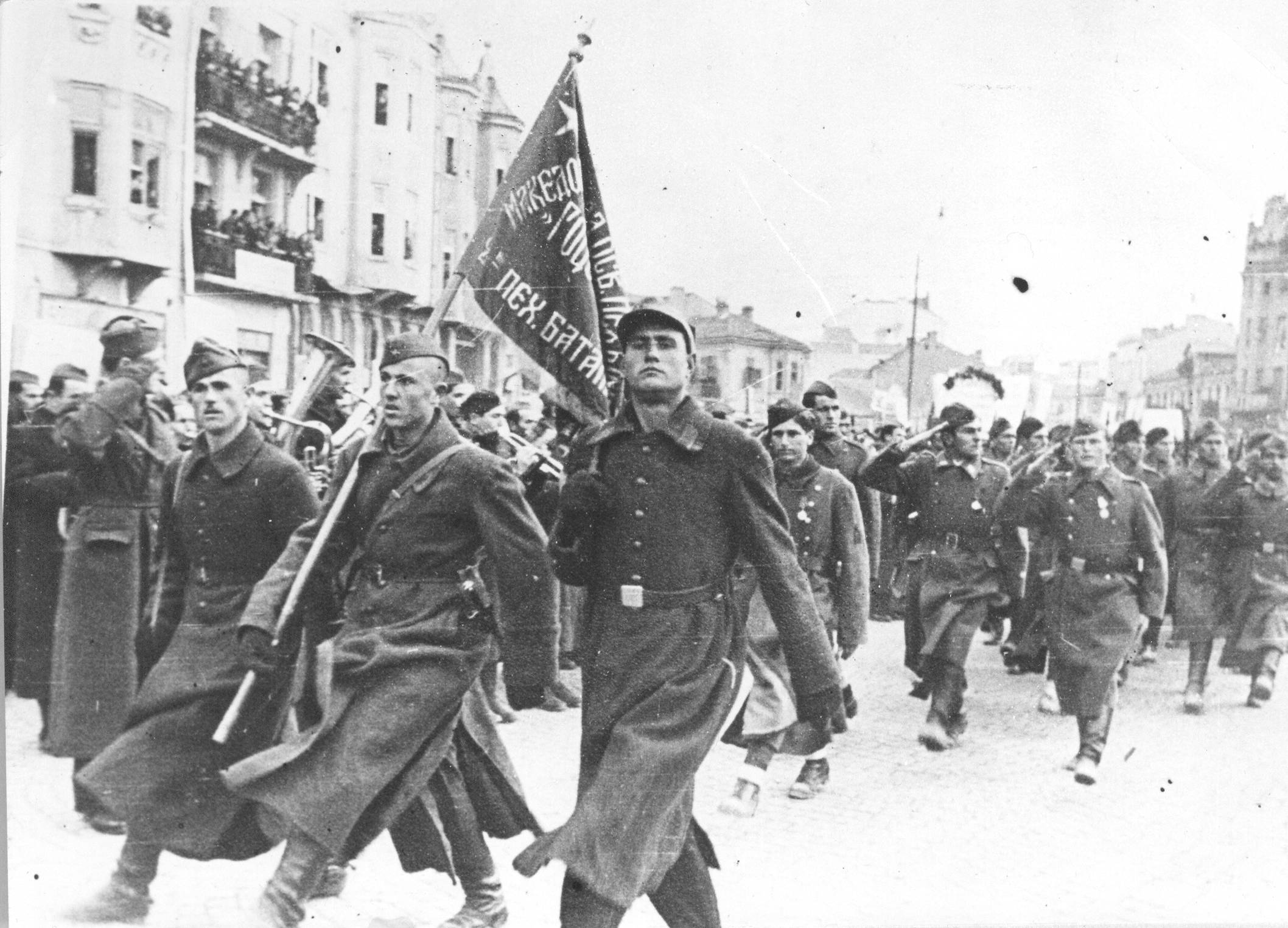
Soldiers of the brigade marching through Skopje in November 1944

"Gotse Delchev" Brigade (Bulgarian: Бригада "Гоце Делчев") was a military unit composed of conscripts and volunteers from the region of Macedonia. The brigade was named after the Internal Macedonian Revolutionary Organization revolutionary Gotse Delchev.

== History ==
The formation of the Gotse Delchev Brigade started in Sofia after the pro-Soviet coup on September 9, 1944. Then the Bulgarian participation in the war switched against the Third Reich. Its official beginning dates back to September 14, when a decree of the Council of Ministers of the new Fatherland Front Government was adopted for this purpose. According to the order of the General Command, the brigade must act together with the Bulgarian Army. It was urgently equipped, armed and involved in hostilities, and was constantly supplemented with new additions. Petar Traykov was appointed commander. After negotiations with the Yugoslav partisans, it was decided the brigade to be turned over to their command. Initially, it consisted of 4,600 people and was composed of soldiers from Vardar Macedonia who served in the Bulgarian Army during 1941–1944, when the area was under Bulgarian control. Its first battalion was sent to the front in Vardar Macedonia on September 30, and the second on October 7. The Brigade set up and equipped by the Bulgarian government provided the basis for the deployment of considerable troops in Vardar Macedonia.

By order of the General Staff of the Macedonian Partisans, the brigade was assigned to the newly formed partisan Bregalnica-Strumica Corps. The only more substantial changes other than renaming were the joining of few hundred guerrillas. At that time some hostilities continued between the Bulgarian army and the Yugoslav partisans. They arose from previous period when Bulgaria had occupied parts from Yugoslavia. As a result, by order of Svetozar Vukmanović-Tempo, the initial composition of the Brigade's Headquarters was changed to local people without military education. The Montenegrin Serb Tempo was Josip Broz Tito's personal envoy in Vardar Macedonia. The name of the Brigade Gotse Delchev had also been removed. The Bulgarian epaulets of the officers were removed too, but without being replaced by other distinctive signs. This suppressed the officers who received their ranks in the Bulgarian Army. The soldiers of the brigade took part in assisting the Bulgarian Army in their repulse operation around Bregalnica and Strumica in October and early November.

In mid-November when the Germans retreated from the region, the brigade already numbered 12,500 people. It had been finally disbanded by the Yugoslav partisans in December, when its units were attached to the 15th Corps and order was given to be sent to the Srem Front. The Yugoslav leadership's hasty promotion of Serbian and Montenegrin officers in charge of Macedonian troops caused resentment among soldiers. The resentment culminated into a revolt. On December 26, the brigade's artillery platoon stationed at the Skopje Fortress, and one of its infantry platoons at Štip revolted against the order to be sent to the Srem front. According to Bulgarian historian Stefan Detchev, the revolt was mostly the work of Macedonian nationalists, with the dissidents wanting to capture Thessaloniki and proclaim a "united Macedonia".

According to Bulgarian sources, in Štip, after they refused to disperse, dozens were shot down and many were arrested on Tempo's order. The soldiers shouted that they want to go to Thessaloniki, instead of Srem. Mihailo Apostolski, who was involved in the suppression of the revolt, claimed the revolt was instigated by a group of young men with Serbian sympathies. After they learned about the Srem front, some of the Macedonian soldiers stationed in Skopje at the fortress' barracks marched across to the Officers' Club on the main square. They demonstrated in front of the building, and demanded access. Similar demonstrations occurred among soldiers remaining at the Skopje fortress and Štip. A Macedonian youth congress was being held at the Officers' Club under the supervision of Apostolski. Tempo, who was present, claimed the revolt was dealt with "exclusively by political means". According to a Bulgarian account, Tempo, who was inside the building, contacted the Yugoslav leadership on how to deal with the unrest, telling the present officers that the dissidents were pro-Bulgarian fascists, and that officers and soldiers who did not comply with orders to go to Srem should be shot. Tempo then sent Apostolski to lecture the dissidents. Apostolski invited around 70 dissident officers to enter the Officers' Club for discussions, while the people of other ranks were told to return to barracks. The officers went inside, and Apostolski said that he ordered the soldiers to line up in the square in front of the Officers' Club, and addressed them from a platform. Per his recollection, he held a short meeting with the men, after which he ordered them to return to barracks at the Skopje fortress, to prepare to march to Srem. One unit went, but a second unit refused to go. According to an alternative version of events, the dissident officers were disarmed when they entered the Officers' Club, had their hands bound and were taken down to the cellars, where they were interrogated by Tempo. Tempo accused them of having fallen under Bulgarian influences. Then they were executed.

According to the Bulgarian account, around 1,000 soldiers, who were aware that something was happening to their officers, returned to central Skopje, where "several dozen" of them were gunned down by Yugoslav troops. Around 900 soldiers were disarmed, arrested and imprisoned at the Skopje fortress, where they were allegedly left for a month without food, water or clothing, so that most of them died. The allegation that a massacre occurred at the Skopje fortress has been strongly challenged by Macedonian sources. Per another version of events, nine dissidents at Skopje were sentenced to death, but their sentences were annulled, while others received lesser sentences, and these men were sent to Srem, with some of them being shot during the march. According to anthropologist Keith Brown, there have been also accounts in Skopje which state the soldiers were killed and buried under the Skopje fortress. The mass execution of dissidents at the Skopje fortress is unproven. The testimony of the soldiers, who were later interrogated and convicted, states that some Serbian and Montenegrin officers addressed them with the words: "You are Southern Serbs," or cursed them as "damned Bulgarians".

== See also ==
- World War II in Yugoslav Macedonia
- Bulgaria during World War II
- Bulgarian rule of Macedonia, Morava Valley and Western Thrace (1941–1944)
