= Pletvar =

Pletvar Плетвар
- Village
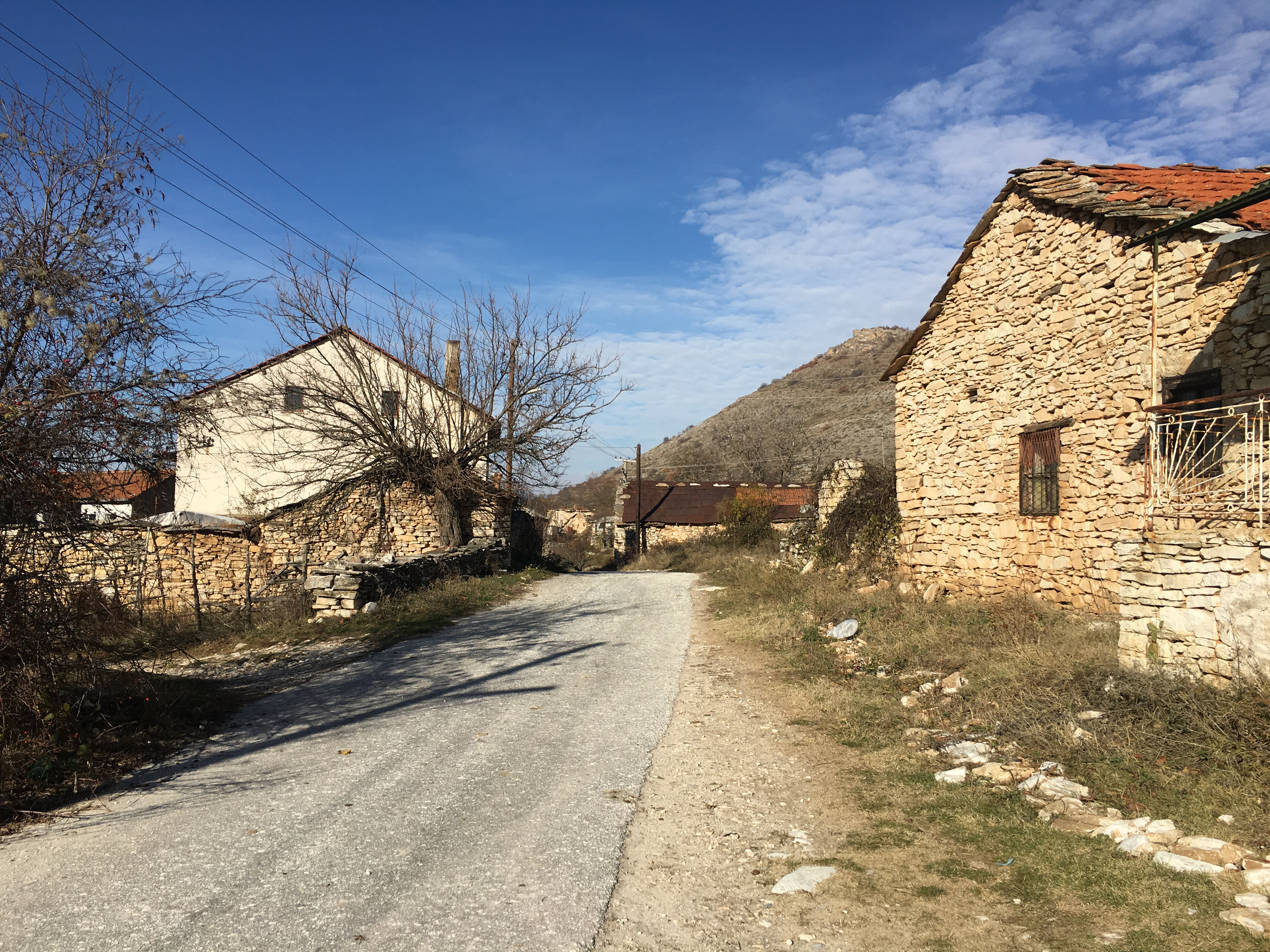
- Road through the village of Pletvar

- Location within North Macedonia
- Country: North Macedonia
- Region: Pelagonia
- Municipality: Prilep
- Elevation: 975 m (3,199 ft)

Population (2002)
  - Total: 22
- Time zone: UTC+1 (CET)
- Area code: +389/48/4XXXXX

Pletvar is a village in Municipality of Prilep, North Macedonia. The critically endangered Macedonian grayling butterfly is only found in the Pletvar area. The father of Metodija Andonov-Čento an anti fascist fighter in World War II is from here.

== Demographics ==
According to the 2002 census, the village had a total of 22 inhabitants. Ethnic groups in the village include:

- Macedonians 21
- Serbs 1
