= Church of St. Petka in Staničenje =

St. Petka Church in Staničenje
- Crkva svete Petke u Staničenju
- St. Petka Church in Staničenje
- 43°12′25.45″N 22°30′51.02″E
- Location: Staničenje, 18300 Pirot, Serbia
- Country: Serbia
- Denomination: Orthodox

Architecture
- Heritage designation: Cultural monument of Great Importance
- Designated: 9 May 1967
- Years built: 1331-32

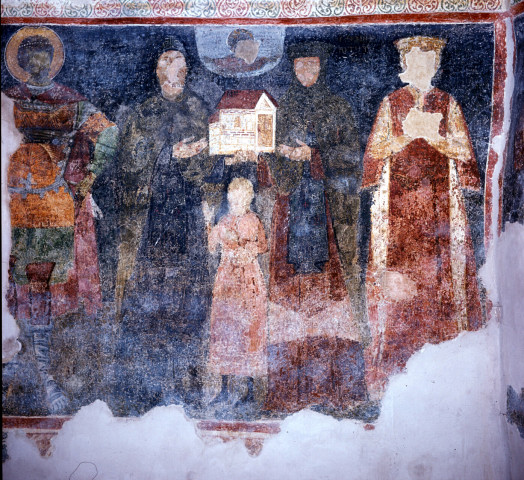
The most popular fresco in St. Petka Church in Staničenje

The Church of St. Petka in Staničenje (Serbian Cyrillic: Црква Свете Петке, Bulgarian: Църква „Света Петка“) is the oldest church in Staničenje, Serbia. In the Middle Ages it was known as the Church of St. Nikola, a Bulgarian monument dating from the beginning of the rule of Tsar Ivan Alexander in the 1330s.

The church is located near Pirot, about 10 kilometers west at the foot of Belava Mountain. It was built on an elevated plateau above the river coast of Nišava, near Staničenje village and the confluence of Temštica, near the main road from Sofia to Niš. A fresco notes that the church was built in 1331-1332.

In 1967, the church was declared a Cultural Monument of Exceptional Importance in Serbia. Radivoje Ljubinković (1910–1979), adviser of the Archeological Institute in Belgrade, visited the building in 1972 and again between 1974 and 1977. Final conservation and restoration of painted walls (frescoes) was made between 1975 and 1978 by Zdenka Živković, a picture restorer from Belgrade.

== History ==
=== Construction period ===
The Church of St. Petka, formerly the Church of St. Nikola, is the oldest church in Staničenje. The fresco epitaph which is written on the west wall above the entrance notes that Arsenije, Jefimija, Konstantin and some other members painted and built the church between 1331 and 1332 in the time of Bulgarian Emperor Ivan Alexander (bulg. Ivan Asen). Some of the people mentioned on the fresco epitaph were already dead by the time the church was completed, so construction was finished by their descendants. Later, a narthex and porch on the south side of the church was built but not preserved. A vestibule with an open wooden porch was built in the 19th century.

=== Turbulent times ===
No written information about the church survives from the Middle Ages under its former dedication to St.Nikola. In later centuries, several historical sources of data contain statements about the church in the late 18th and early 19th centuries. In the memoirs of archpriest Aleksa Minčić, the following is noted:

"A long time ago, it must have been at the end of the 18th century, the priests and all the people who happened to be [in the church] perished, so after that the church was closed for the next 30 years. And it was like this: one year, just for Annunciation, in the time when the priests organized a Divine Liturgy, in the church and the churchyard were many people. Suddenly, [the thugs from] Kardzhali struck and attacked the people in the church and churchyard, and the most horrible killing and slaughtering of people and priests began. All people and priests were killed that day. Everything was plundered and the church was almost destroyed in that Kardzhali action. And today, when someone digs in the churchyard, human bones are found. Those are the bones from the Annunciation. Since then, the church in Staničenje could no longer serve its purpose until 1829. In that time, [it] did not have a priest because they were often killed. In that year, 1829, the people of Staničenje get one priest and they ask the landowner to allow them to recover back the church so it can serve its purpose. The landowner accommodates them under the condition that they must give him, in the name of a church holiday, 26th July, a sterile sheep every year. People of Staničenje recovered the church and it began to serve again to its purpose, and the landowner, since that year, received sterile sheep from the village every year."

The church was desecrated for the last time in the fall of 1877, following the liberation from the Ottoman Empire. The Circassians plundered, looted, and desecrated all of Staničenje, also burning all the liturgical books in the Church of St. Petka.

During the restoration which followed soon after liberation, the church received its first church bells. On one of them is a relief of St. Sava and an inscription which reads:

- "After 500 years of slavery under the Turks, for the first time, we ring out the bell in remembrance of our posterity and for the glory of the Church of St. Petka - Staničenje municipality."

At the bottom of the bell, the year 1882 is engraved.

On the second bell, an inscription reads:

- "To commemorate our liberation from the Turks, and to the glory of our King Milan M. Obrenović, we pour out this bell. - From Villagers of Staničenje to our church St. Petka."

Around the perimeter of the bottom of this bell is inscribed "Đorđe Bota and the sons" and also the year 1882.

=== Era after the liberation from the Turks ===
In the 1970s, Radivoje Ljubinković carried out archeological research, including interviewing the oldest inhabitants of the village. From this, he learned that the church had not been significantly rebuilt or enlarged in the previous century (meaning after the liberation in 1877), and the final form was acquired during Turkish rule. He recorded a legend that the main church in the village had been the church of St. Jovan the Baptist, once located near the present cemetery; after its demolition, the Church of St. Petka became the village church.

== Architecture ==
=== Location ===
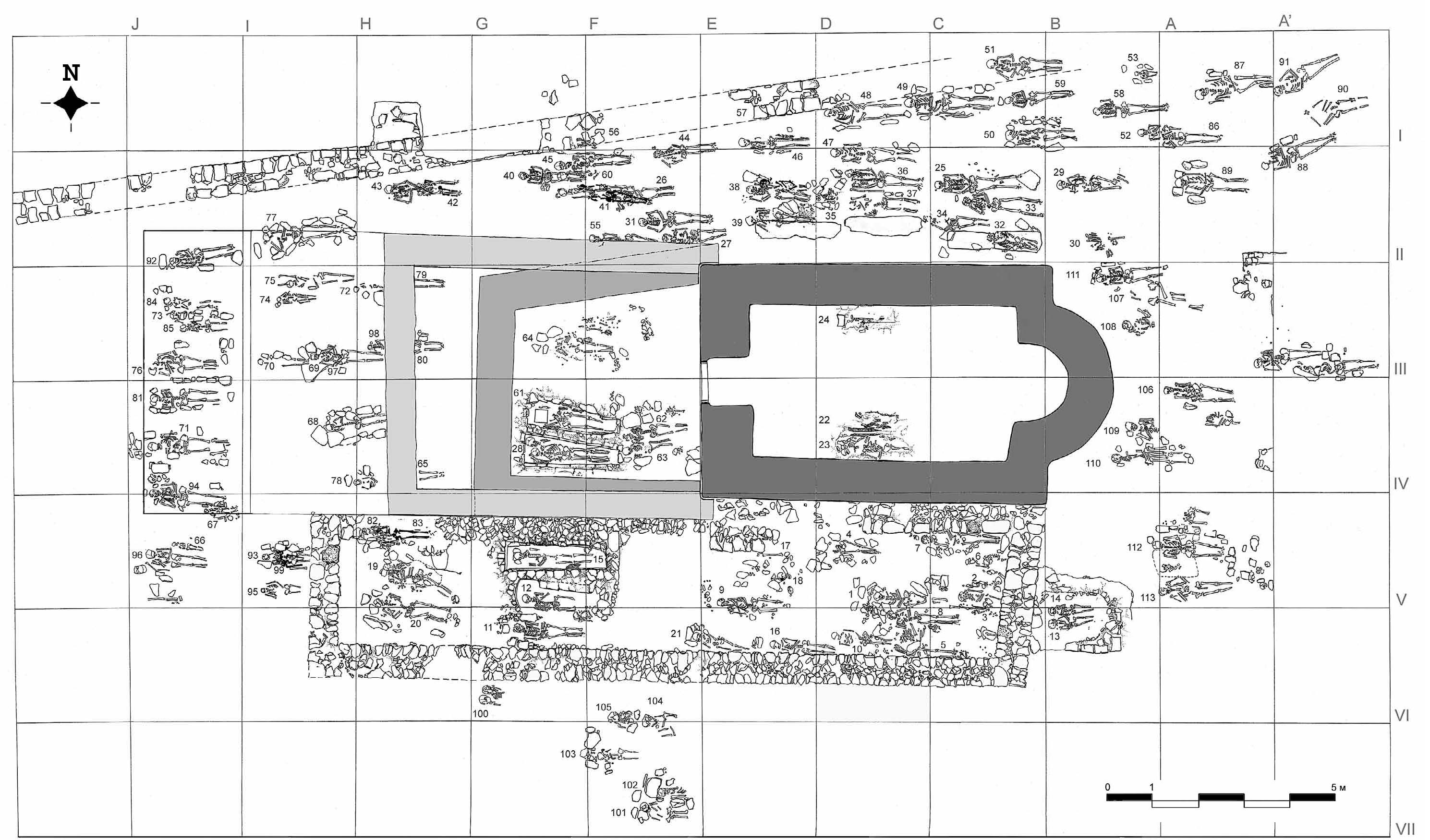
Map of St. Petka Church in Staničenje

The elevated plateau above the coast of the Nišava river and its local microenvironment, where the church is located, represents a dominant strategic position. Soil composition on which church is built consist of fluvial sediments: earth with sand, fine gravel, and many of pebbles of various sizes.

Through archeological research, it was found that the oldest cultural layer, formed at the site, was from the time when the church was constructed. The discovery of an early Byzantine fibula, followed by a later discovery of bricks and brick fragments embedded within the soil, as well as a carved altar in the function of a column, does not indicate the existence of an ancient layer.

=== Phases of construction ===
The oldest phase was the primary construction and painting of the feudal Church of St. Nikola in the years 1331 - 1332. A narthex was added in the following years.

In the second phase, some time after the destruction of narthex, an ordinary porch was built in its stead. This addition has not been precisely dated, but it can be assumed that it was sometime before the end of the 16th century. The next two phases of extensions and upgrades can be reliably dated to the 18th century but before 1796, when the old church in Staničenje was severely damaged.

During the third phase, a spacious half-timbered narthex was built on the site of the former porch. Some time later, an annex with a longitudinal rectangular base was added to the southern side of the church.

The last phase of construction of the church was a conservation and restoration effort carried out from 1973 to 1976, in which the Church of St. Petka was rebuilt and had its open narthex restored, thus giving the church its final form.

=== The original construction ===
==== Basis and the composition of the wall of the temple ====
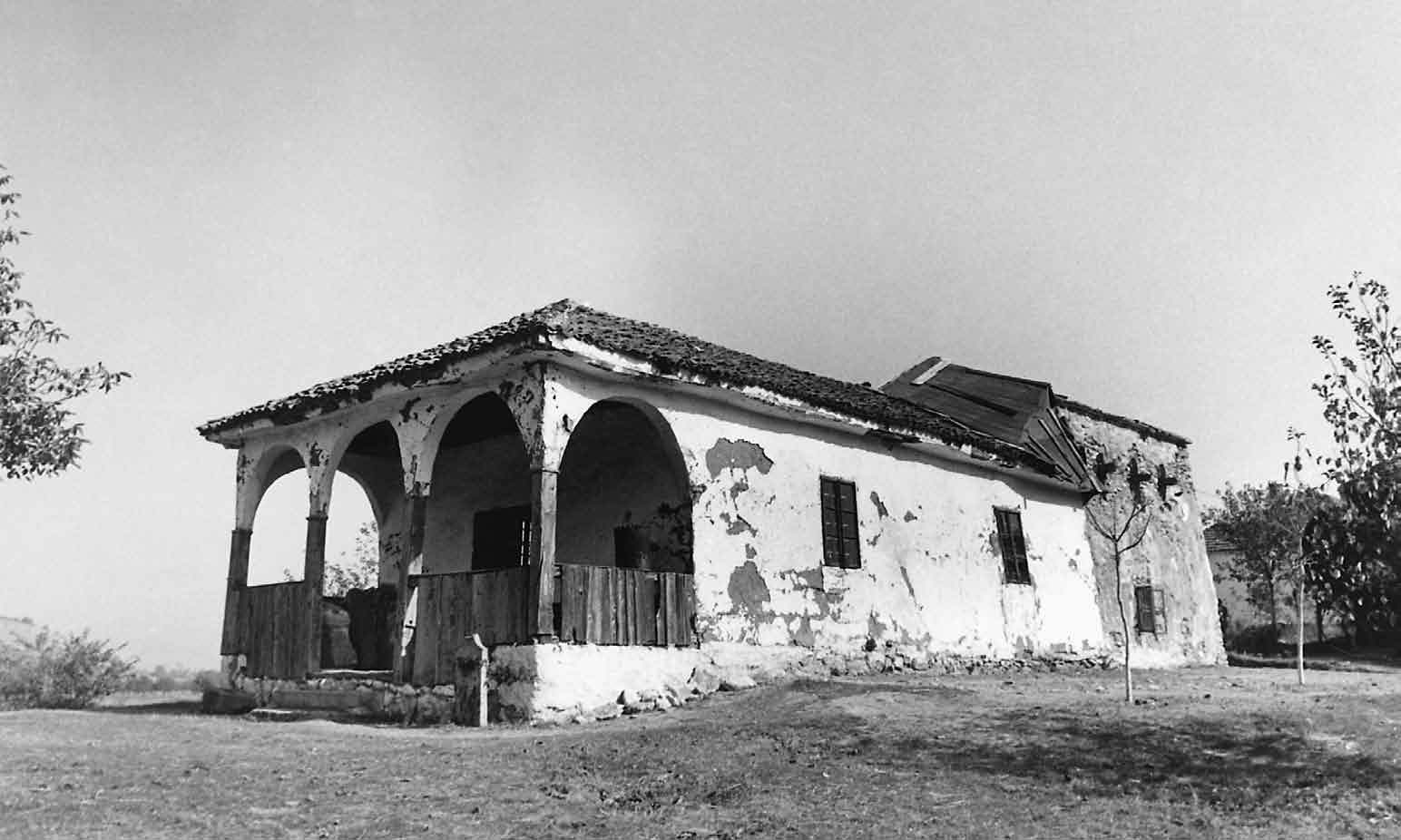
Church of St. Petka before reconstruction

In its original 1332 form, St. Nikola's was built as a rectangular church with a semi-circular altar apse on the east with a total length of 8.9 meters and a width of 5.1 meters. The church was vaulted with a barrel vault, built of cut limestone, the top of which was about 5.6 meters above the floor level.

The walls were crudely constructed with uneven thickness, decreasing in higher areas. The northern and southern walls were approximately 0.9 meters thick at their base, while some walls nearer to the vault did not exceed 0.7–0.8 meters. A similar phenomenon can be seen in the wall of the altar apse on the ground level, where the wall was over one meter thick. The foundation walls were very shallow (0.3–0.4 meters) and were roughly built by pouring the wall mass into an irregularly dug trench.

The materials of the walls are almost entirely made from river pebbles attached with a mortar binder. They were reinforced with wooden crossbars (beams of square cross section, from 15×15 centimeters to 18×18 centimeters) which were located inside the structure of the wall mass. Two parallel beams were placed in horizontal lines with a distance between them of 0.7 to 0.8 meters vertically. On the outer face of the wall, the crossbars appear only under the roof cornice and form the base of both gables. From the inside part of the wall, outer beams are covered only with a layer of fresco plaster. In the western wall, there is an entrance with a stone threshold and shallow jambs. The architrave lintel consists of a series of beams of square cross sections and in that frame there was once a wooden structure with double-winged doors.

==== The interior of the church ====
The interior of the church is illuminated by two small windows. One window, elevated about three meters above the floor level, was placed just below the arch in the central part of the southern wall. It was modeled in the form of round-arched niche, with a relatively narrow opening to the outside part of the wall. Later, that window was bricked, but its original form with fresco decoration was preserved. There was a similar window above the altar in the wall of the altar apse. It was later replaced by a larger window during the 19th century reconstruction, but during conservation work it was restored.

The interior is decorated with frescoes, painted on walls which were divided into two compartments; these were removed in a later phase of construction. The nave, measuring 4.2 x 3.35m, was separated from the large altar space by a wall altar partition. Due to the limited area of the altar, the original altar table made of bricks was set up with the apse wall. All that remains of it is a print on the surrounding painting, surrounded by a red border, and a substructure discovered during archaeological excavations. The print is about a meter from the floor, topped with shingles, approximately 0.7 meters wide, which stood on a stone column.

==== The roof of the church ====
The Church of St. Petka was covered with roof tiles, indicated by the fact that there are no remains of roof bricks and no indications of the existence of a lead covering above the vault. The cornice, which has not been preserved in its original form, was probably made of a series of roughly-hewn stone slabs.

==== The narthex of the church ====
Shortly after the church was built, a narthex was added, which had a length of 4 meters of internal space, but because of deviation of the northern wall, its width is unequal. The facade of the narthex is 4.6 meters in length by and approximately 4 meters on the western side. The walls of the original narthex were about 0.8 to 0.85 meters thick and shallow grounded (about 0.3 meters deep). During the reconstruction, a significant part of the south wall was removed and the central part of the west wall, along with the last remains of the entrance, were also destroyed.

== Paintings in the temple ==
=== Founder's and donor's inscription ===
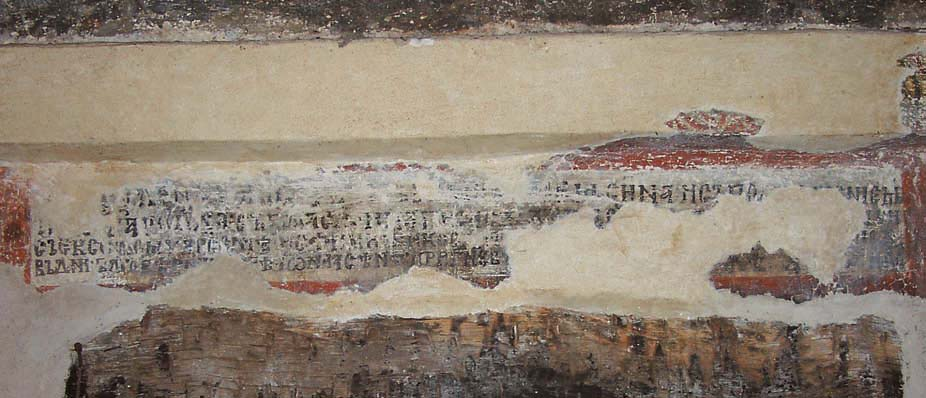
Donor's inscription in the church of St. Petka

A group of painters carried out the whole gallery of portraits on the western part of the nave, composed of ten figures. Several portraits were painted in the narthex, but today only fresco fragments of them remain, which are kept in the Gallery of Frescoes in Belgrade. The paintings depict noblemen, noblewomen, aristocrats, monks, and nuns, of different ages. These frescoes are important sources of material for understanding the aristocratic and royal costumes of the period.

The founder's inscription was written on the inner western wall of the nave, above the entrance to the church, covering the entire width of the lintel. The text of the inscription is written in four lines on a white background in black letters of unequal size. The text begins with the trinity invocation in Church Slavonic language: “Izvolenijem Otca I savršenijem Sina I sapospešenijem”, common to founding inscriptions of Serbs and Bulgarians in the Middle Ages. At the very beginning, the first word was preceded by a small painted cross, partially preserved (Latin invocatio symbolica), which usually began and ended inscriptions of this type in the Middle Ages. Unusually, a mention of the Bulgarian Emperor also mentions the name of the Vidin master Balaur. The label reveals that Balaur was co-ruler, which is important proof of his real power within the Bulgarian elite.

=== Frescoes ===
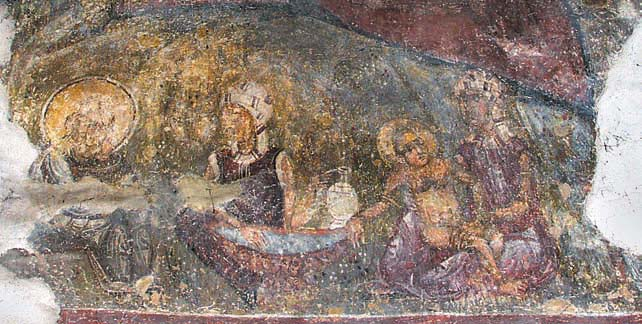
The birth of Christ in church St. Petka in Staničenje

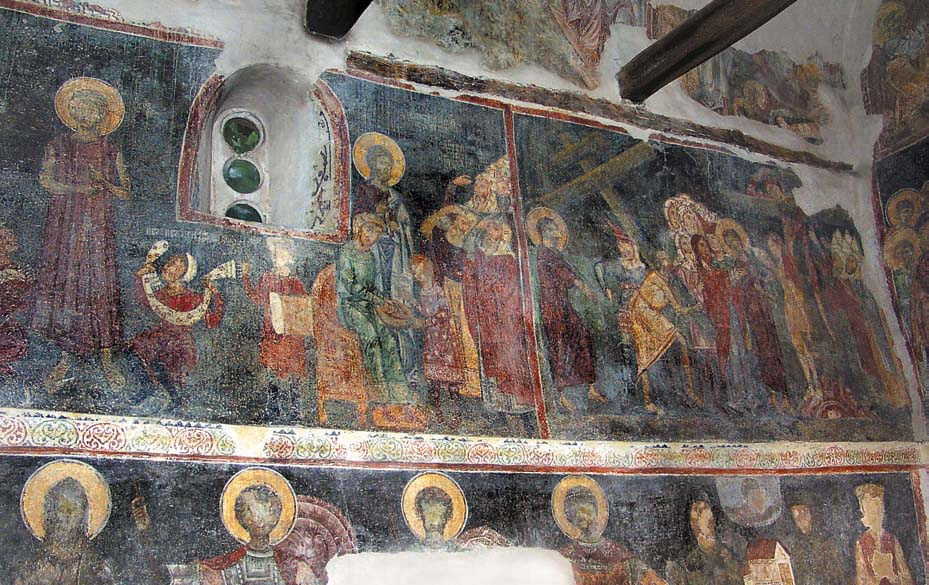
Frescoes in St. Petka Church in Staničenje

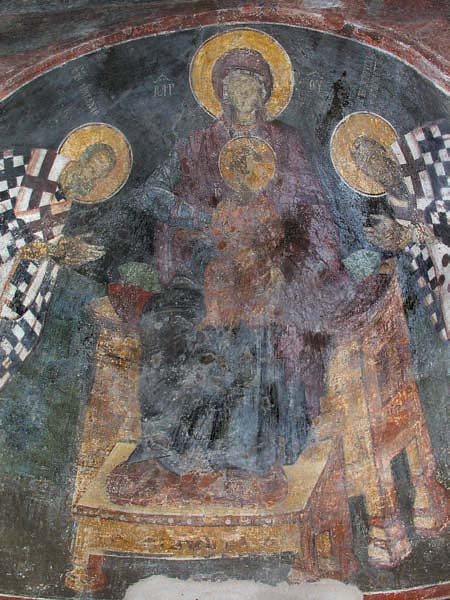
The Virgin Mary with Christ in the Church of St. Petka in Staničenje

Painted work in the church has been mostly preserved. Inside the church, frescoes on the barrel vault were destroyed, but the other frescoes remain. However, the quality of the frescoes has diminished over time. A considerable amount of detail, especially on the incarnate figures, has been lost.

Relatively little has been written about Staničenje's frescoes. In the first report that Radivoje and Mirjana Ljubinković published after the archeological and conservational works on the church, the church was finally known to science. Unfortunately, frescoes in Staničenje remain largely incomplete.

- The frescoes on the half-shaped vault in the naos, today almost destroyed, contained standing representations of Old Testament prophets, as shown by the small remains of the painting. In the southern half and in the eastern part, there are the remains of three standing figures. Comparing the size of the space in the extension, it can be assumed that there were ten figures on that side, leading to the assumption of a total of twenty figures spanning both sides of the vault.
- The smaller dimensions of the building led to a diminished quantity of frescoes in the altar. In it, there is no scene of the Communion of the Apostles. The frescoes from the vault and the triumphal arch – the Ascension of Christ and the Annunciation to the Mother of God – belong to the set of Great Holidays. The conch of the apse contains unusual representations of the Virgin Mary with Christ, enthroned with St. Nicholas and St. Cyril the Philosopher. In the area below is depicted is the Adoration to Christ. In the niche, Christ lies half-naked, dead, and on the walls are three standing figures of Deacons. On the eastern and southern walls are frontal busts of two bishops.
- The content of frescoes on the eastern wall of the narthex consist of:

1. cycle patron of the church,
2. frieze of busts of saints,
3. standing figures in the first zone
4. a high-placed decorative belt

Unlike the frescoes in the nave, the remaining frescoes in the narthex were not protected over time, and thus have faded. Interpreting these frescoes is thus more difficult, and stylistic features cannot be easily identified.

Three upper zones of the frescoes are a dedicated cycle of St. Nikola, patron saint of Staničenje. In the lower part, starting from the north, are compositions of three dukes in a dungeon. These illustrations are some of the more famous miracles of St. Nikola, but their fresco depictions are incompletely preserved. The figure of Emperor Constantine is recognizable as the person locking the wrongfully accused dukes in the dungeon, as is noted in written sources of St. Nikola.

== Changes to the name of the church ==
There are two legends about how the Church of St. Nikola became the Church of St. Petka.

The first legend dates back to 1398, and relates that Princess Milica, engaging in diplomatic activities, had gone with Jefimija to Sultan Bayezid to represent the interests of Stephen Uroš IV Dušan of Serbia that year. During this trip, she obtained the transfer of relics of St. Petka from Vidin to Belgrade. The legend states that the relics stayed overnight in Staničenje, in the church of St. Nikola. After that, the relics were placed in the chapel of St. Petka at Kalemegdan, and today these relics reside in the Romanian city Iași.

The second legend states that on 25 March 1796, according to the old calendar of the Annunciation of the Blessed Virgin Mary, there was a crowd of people at the Church of St. Petka and its surrounding churchyard. At that moment, Kardzhali villagers attacked and slaughtered everyone present, including the priest. Consequently, the church did not open its doors for the next 30 years. This legend states that upon reopening, the Church changed its name to the Church of St. Petka. In more recent times, the church's primary holiday is Holy Friday of Thorns, 8 August.

== Notable graves ==
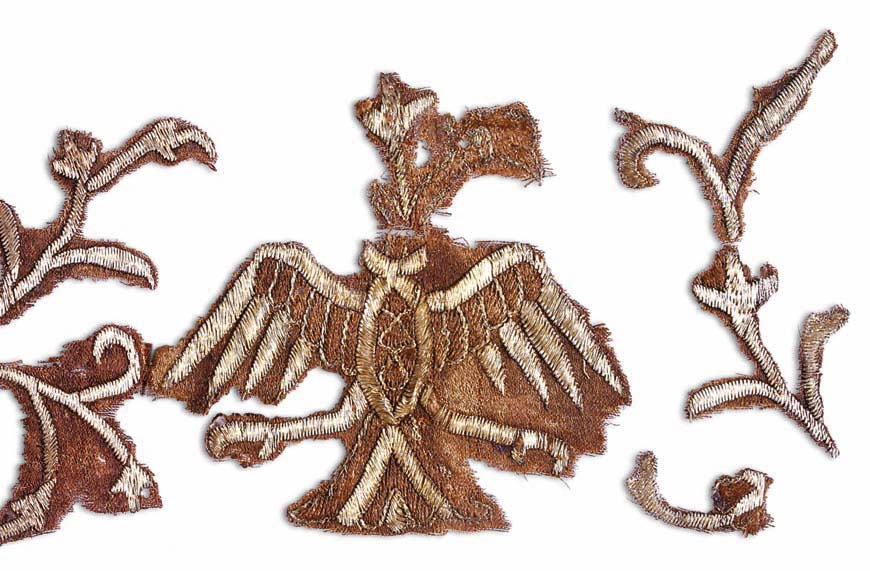
The two-headed eagle done in gold embroidery

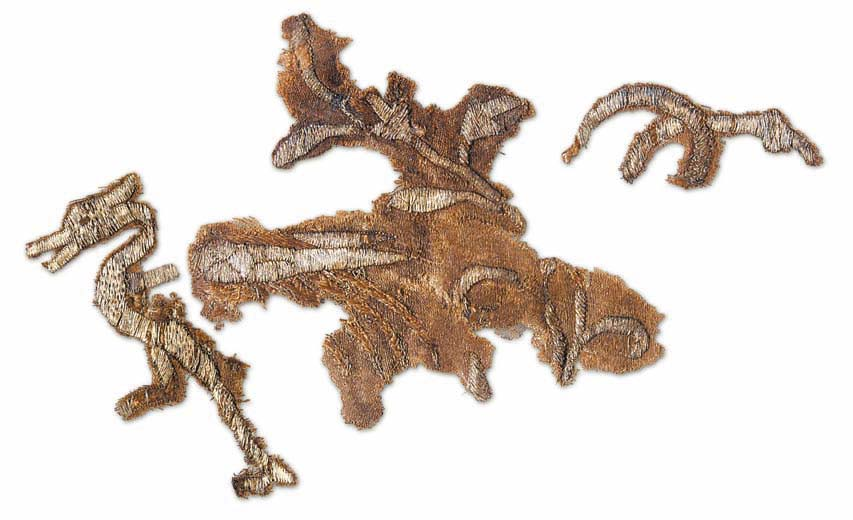
Remains of fabric made with gold embroidery

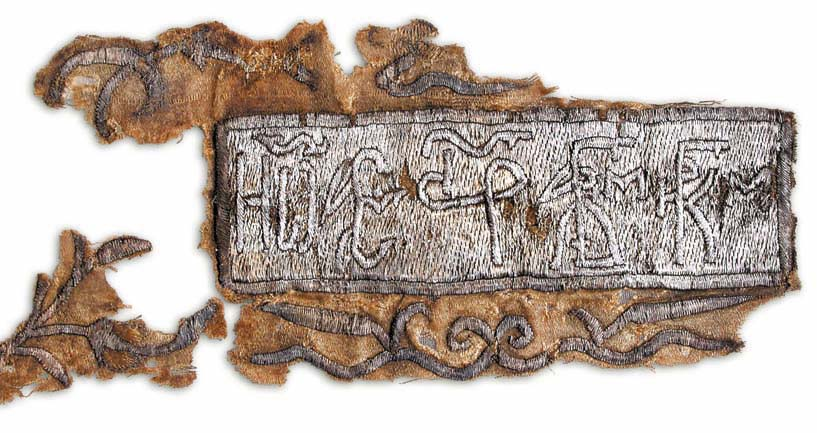
Gold embroidery from royal robes founded in grave 15.

In the nave of the church there are four burial graves, heavily damaged by digging.

One grave that remains well-preserved is Grave No. 23, buried along the southern wall. In the oak chest, of which only parts are visible, a young noblewoman is buried. Judging from the preserved parts, she wore gilded robes detailed with ornaments of double-headed eagles. A piece, or a third of a thin silver penny, was found in her grave.

Next to this grave was a similar wooden coffin, of which only small parts remain, in Grave No. 22. Where the head of the deceased used to be, a third of a thin silver penny was laid on a stone slab, the same as in the grave of the young noblewoman. Both coffins were simultaneously filled with mortar with very little stone.

The location of the founder's tomb was determined to be Grave No. 15, buried on the outside of the southern wall of the narthex. On the remains of a deceased young male were found parts of a robe with 27 silver buttons with gold embroidered work. In addition to ornamented detail, there were also preserved metopes with the name of Tsar Ivan Alexander. The embroidery in gold appears to have been made in an atelier working for the Bulgarian royal court.
