= Paraska =

- Paraska Korolyuk, Ukrainian political activist
- Paraska Plytka-Horytsvit (1927-1998), Ukrainian Hutsul artist, writer and ethnographer

== See also ==
- Paraskeva
