= Paraskevopoulos =

Paraskevopoulos (Greek: Παρασκευόπουλος, "son of Paraskevas") is a Greek surname with the feminine form being Paraskevopoulou (Παρασκευοπούλου). It is the surname of:

- Georgios Paraskevopoulos, Greek cyclist
- Ioannis Paraskevopoulos (1900–1984), Greek banker and interim Prime Minister of Greece
- John S. Paraskevopoulos (1889–1961), Greek–South African astronomer
- Leonidas Paraskevopoulos (1860–1936), Greek general and politician
- Nikos Paraskevopoulos, Greek criminologist and Minister of Justice.
- Panagiotis Paraskevopoulos (1875–1956), Greek athlete

== See also ==
- 5298 Paraskevopoulos asteroid, named after John S. Paraskevopoulos.
- Paraskevopoulos (crater) on the far side of the Moon, named after John S. Paraskevopoulos.
