= João Paraskeva =

João M. Paraskeva is a Mozambican-born public intellectual, pedagogue, critical social theorist, and professor of education at the University of Strathclyde in Glasgow, Scotland. Paraskeva was born in Maputo, Mozambique, where he completed his elementary and high school education. He pursued higher studies at the Portuguese Catholic University and the University of Minho in Portugal. Paraskeva has held teaching positions at the University of Minho and in South Africa, Brazil, Spain, and Italy before moving to the United States. He also served as a Visiting Professor at Miami University in Oxford, Ohio.

== Academic contributions ==
Before Paraskeva's appointment at the University of Strathclyde, he held faculty positions at several universities, including the University of Massachusetts Dartmouth in the U.S. At the University of Strathclyde, Paraskeva is a professor in Educational Leadership and Policy Studies.

Paraskeva is among the leading educational researchers in educational and curriculum studies. He is known for creating the Itinerant Curriculum Theory (ICT), which, in contrast to fixed or standardized views of education, emphasizes the fluidity and diversity of knowledge, suggesting that curriculum should be adaptable, open to diverse epistemologies, and sensitive to the unique cultural, historical, and political contexts of different communities. As van Milders has stated, "Paraskeva offers a highly insightful contribution that attempts to fundamentally reshape the debates on curriculum".

It has been argued that there is a need for Paraskeva’s (2011) Itinerant Curriculum Theory (ICT) in US public education as several reforms such as Race to the Top (RTTT), No Child Left Behind (NCLB), and Ever Child Succeeds Act (ECSA) have perpetuated "a process of colonizing the mind instead of creating a space for liberatory pedagogy and ICT in which identities, spiritualities, and knowledges would strengthen instead of facing erasure."

Paraskeva's theory has also been used in postcolonial studies and global contexts since it challenges the Western knowledge system and speaks on behalf of the subaltern, and favors postcolonial reforms of education. Throughout his work, Paraskeva has emphasized the importance of education as a tool for social change, advocating for policies and practices that promote equal opportunities, inclusion, and justice in schools and universities.

Paraskeva has been critical of neoliberalism and globalization, driven by financial markets, which has led to widespread privatization and budget cuts in education, particularly affecting public services and collective bargaining. He has argued that education has shifted from a social to an economic good, resulting in increased privatization, student loans, and a redefinition of public education in a financialized world.

Paraskeva has been defined as "undeniably one of the most acclaimed curriculum theorists in the world today." (Autio, 2023) "One of the most exceptional scholars writing in the curriculum field today." (McCarthy, 2023) and responsible for 'one of the most influential discourses now.' (Pinar, 2013) It has also been argued that Paraskeva's political discourse shares similarities with the ideas of Noam Chomsky and Slavoj Žižek, both of whom are key figures in understanding the complexities and fragmentation of today's world.

== Publications ==
Paraskeva has authored numerous books and articles that explore critical issues in education. His book Curriculum Epistimicide: Towards an Itinerant Curriculum Theory won an AERA Book Award. Some of his notable works include:

- As Dinâmicas dos Conflitos Ideológicos e Culturais na Fundamentação do Currículo. [The Dynamics of Cultural and Ideological Conflicts within Educational and Curriculum Foundations.] Porto: ASA Editores, Portugal. [Portuguese Edition] (2000)
- Ventos de Descolarização. Nova Ameaç à Escol Pública. [Winds of [De]schooling. The New Threat to Public Schooling]. Lisboa: Plátano Editora [com/with Michael W. Apple and Juro Torres Santomé] (2003)
- Ideologia, Cultura e Currículo, [Ideology, Culture and Curriculum]. Porto. Didáctica. Portugal. (2007)
- Unaccomplished Utopia. Neoliberal Dismantle of European Higher Education. Boston: Sense. (2009) (ed.)
- Nova Teoria Curricular [New Curriculum Theory]. Lisboa: Pedago (2011)
- Conflicts in Curriculum Theory: Challenging Hegemonic Epistemologies. New York: Palgrave [1st Edition](2011)
- Globalisms and Power. New York: Peter Lang. (co-edited with Juro Torres Santomé) (2012)
- Conflicts in Curriculum Theory: Challenging Hegemonic Epistemologies [Updated Paper Back Edition] (2014)
- Global Financial Crisis and Education Restructuring. New York: Peter Lang. (co-edited with Michael Peters and Tina Besley) (2015)
- International Critical Pedagogy Reader. New York: Routledge (co-edited with Antonia Darder and Peter Mayo) (2015)
- Nueva Teoría de la Educación. [New Educational Theory] Queretaro; Universidade Autonoma de Querétaro, Mexico. [Spanish Translation] (2015)
- Curriculum Epistemicide: Towards an Itinerant Curriculum Theory. New York: Routledge. (2016)
- Curriculum: Whose Internationalization? New York: Peter Lang (2016) (ed.)
- Curriculum: Decanonizing the Field. New York: Peter Lang (co-edited with Shirley Steinberg (2016)
- The Epistemicide: Towards a Just Curriculum Theory: The Epistemicide (2017) (ed.)
- 교육과정 인식론적 학살 - 탈식민주의와 교육과정 연구 - [Curriculum Epistemicides. Decolonization and Curriculum Studies] Seoul: Academic Press. [Korean translation] (2020)
- Critical Transformative Educational Leadership and Policy Studies. New York: Meyers Educational Press. (2020) (ed.)
- Curriculum and the Generation of Utopia Interrogating the Current State of Critical Curriculum Theory. New York: Routledge (2021)
- Critical Transformative Educational Leadership and Policy Studies - A Reader: Discussions and Solutions from the Leading Voices in Education (2021) Gotham: MEP (ed.)
- Conflicts in Curriculum Theory: Challenging Hegemonic Epistemologies. New York: Palgrave [Updated 2nd Edition] (2022)
- Epistemicidio curricular: Hacia una Teoría Curricular Itinerante. [Curriculum Epistemicide: Towards an Itinerant Curriculum Theory] Aires: Miño y Dávila. [Spanish Translation] (2022)
- The Curriculum: A New Comprehensive Reader. New York: Peter Lang (2023) (ed.)
- Critical Perspectives on the Denial of Caste in Educational Debate: Towards a Non-derivative Curriculum Reason. New York: Routlefge (2023) (ed.).
- Itinerant Curriculum Theory: A Declaration of Epistemological Independence. New York: Bloomsbury (2024) (ed.)
