= Paraskevas (given name) =

Paraskevas (Greek: Παρασκευάς, romanized: Paraskevás, lit. 'Preparation') is a Greek male given name with the female equivalent being Paraskevi (Παρασκευή). Notable people with the name include:

- Paraskevas Andralas (born 1978), Greek association football player
- Paraskevas Antzas (1976–2026), Greece national team football player
- Paraskevas Christou (born 1984), Cypriot national team football player
- Paraskevas Sphicas, particle physicist

== See also ==
- Paraskevas (surname), Greek surname
- Paraskėvas, Lithuanian given name
- Paraskevopoulos, Greek surname ("son of Paraskevas")
