= Paraskevas (surname) =

Paraskevas (Greek: Παρασκευάς) is a Greek surname. It is the surname of:

- Apostolos Paraskevas, Greek composer and guitarist.
- Betty Paraskevas (1929–2010), American lyricist.
- Michael Paraskevas (born 1961), American illustrator.
- Janet Paraskeva (born 1946), British government official.
- Michalis Paraskevas (born 1976), a Cypriot lawyer and social activist.

== See also ==
- Paraskevas (given name), Greek given name.
- Paraskevopoulos, Greek surname ("son of Paraskevas")
