= Liberei =

Old library building in Braunschweig, Germany

Coordinates: 52°16′05″N 10°31′15″E

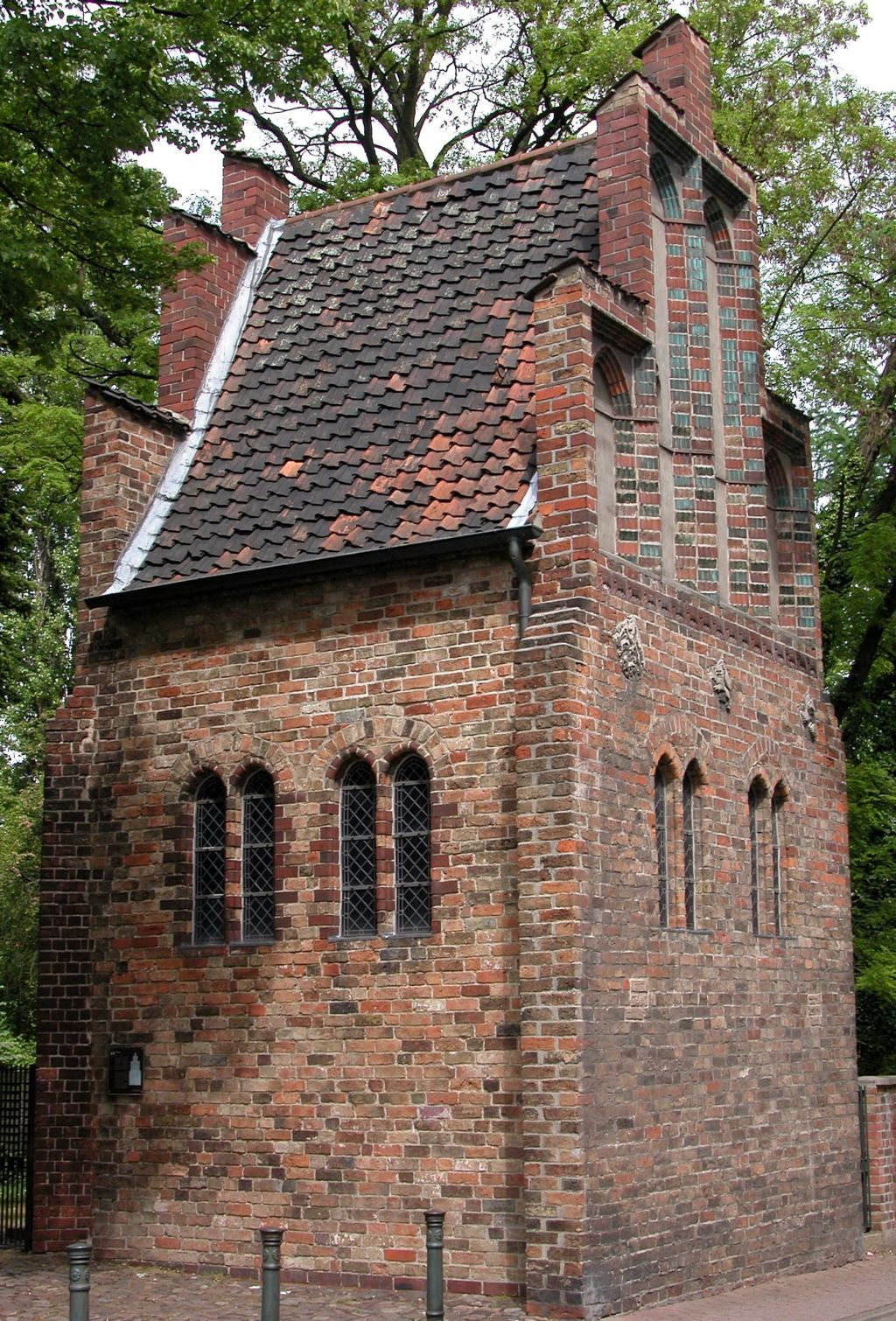
Southwest view of the Liberei

The Liberei, also called Liberey or Andreana, in Braunschweig is considered the oldest freestanding library building north of the Alps. It was built between 1412 and 1422 in Kröppelstraße in the Neustadt municipal area, just a few meters southeast of St. Andreas Church. Due to donations, among others from Johann Ember and especially Gerwin von Hameln, the library was known beyond the borders of the city and was considered one of the most important collections of books and manuscripts in northern Germany for more than 300 years until its dissolution in 1753.

The donation of 336 volumes by Gerwin von Hameln in 1495 marks both the high point and the turning point in the history of the library. After Gerwin's death, there were disputes between the city council and Gerwin's heirs for decades, so that the building and the book collection were permanently damaged by neglect and theft. Although contemporary scholars such as Johannes Bugenhagen in the 16th century or Hermann von der Hardt in the early 18th century pointed out both the importance of the Liberei as a source of knowledge and its endangered state, its decline could not be stopped. In 1753, the remaining holdings were transferred to a larger library. According to current research, 137 volumes from Gerwin's estate still survive.

The chapel-like brick building measures only 5.50 meters × 5.14 meters in floor plan. The building was severely damaged during World War II and was not restored until 1963. The Liberei is the only evidence of medieval brick Gothic in the city and is also probably the oldest surviving building in Germany that was built exclusively as a library. The building is now a listed monument.

== History ==
=== Origin ===
The origins of the library date back to the end of 1309. Shortly before, Master Jordanus, pastor of St. Andreas Church, had died and had left his collection of 18 manuscripts to his parish church in his will "for eternity". The library was founded in 1309.

In the degeding book of the new town the titles were listed individually and noted in addition:

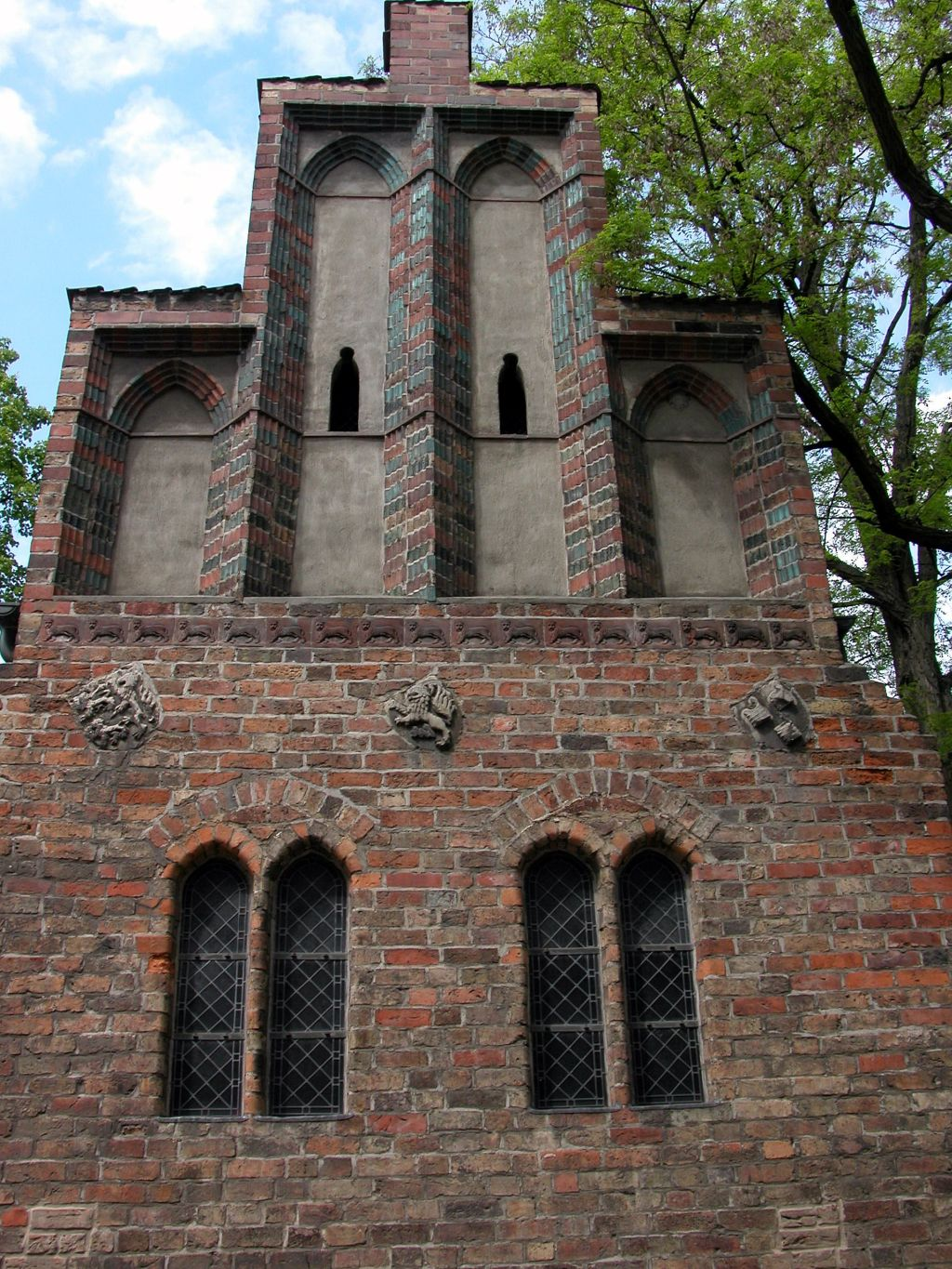
South gable with ornamental cover, decorative frieze and coat of arms

„Dit sint de boke, de mester Jordan, de pernere was to sunte Andreas, deme god gnedich si, heft ghegheven sine nakomelinghen unde eren cappellanen to erer nut to brukende. unde se scullen ewelike bliwen bi der parren. […]“

– Heinrich Nentwig: Das ältere Buchwesen in Braunschweig. p. 19

"These are the books which Master Jordan, who was parish priest at St. Andreas, to whom God be gracious, gave to his successors in office and their chaplains for their use. And they shall remain in the parish/diocese forever ... [...]"

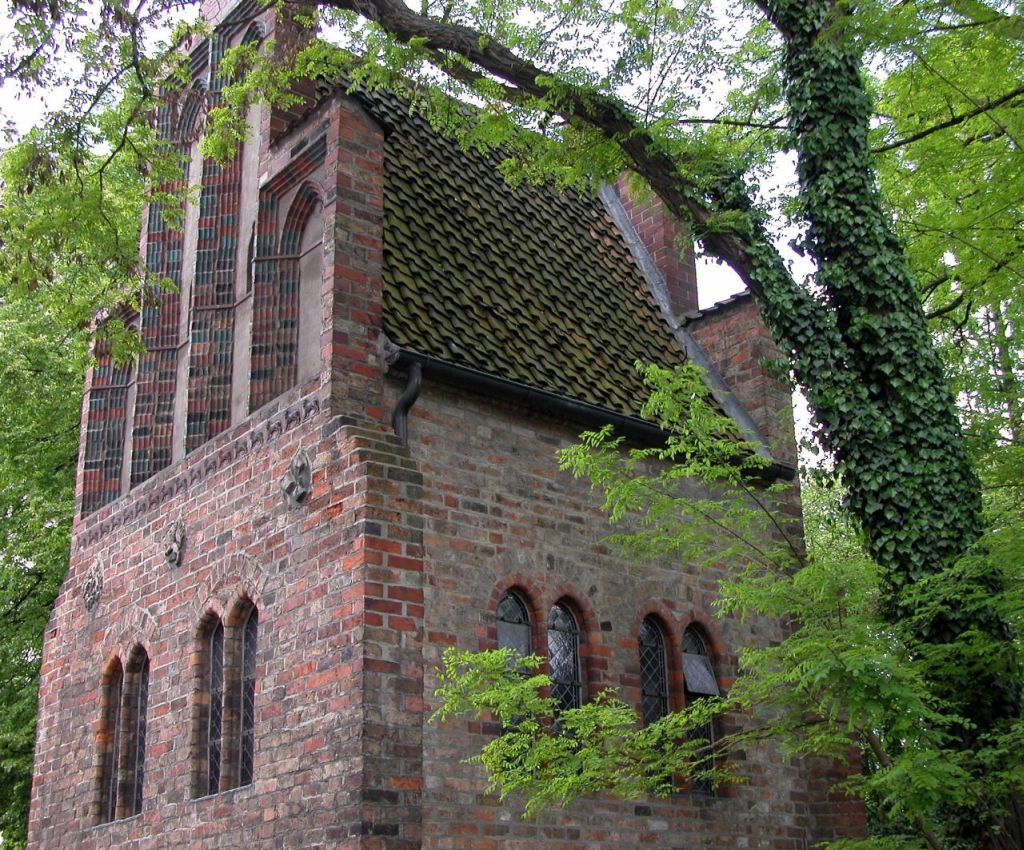
Southeast view

The importance of this collection can be gauged from the fact that his successors, first and foremost Magister Bruno Luckemann as the immediate successor in office (1310-1336), had to sign a document vis-à-vis the dean of St. Blasiusstift as the holder of the patronage of St. Andreas Church, which not only listed the individual titles of the holdings, but also contained the obligation to keep them intact for the church and not to sell them under any circumstances. Finally, each successor had to deposit a bail for the library. The document signed by Magister Bruno on 18 May 1310, barely six months after the death of Jordanus, the founder of the library, contains the oldest listing of the holdings.

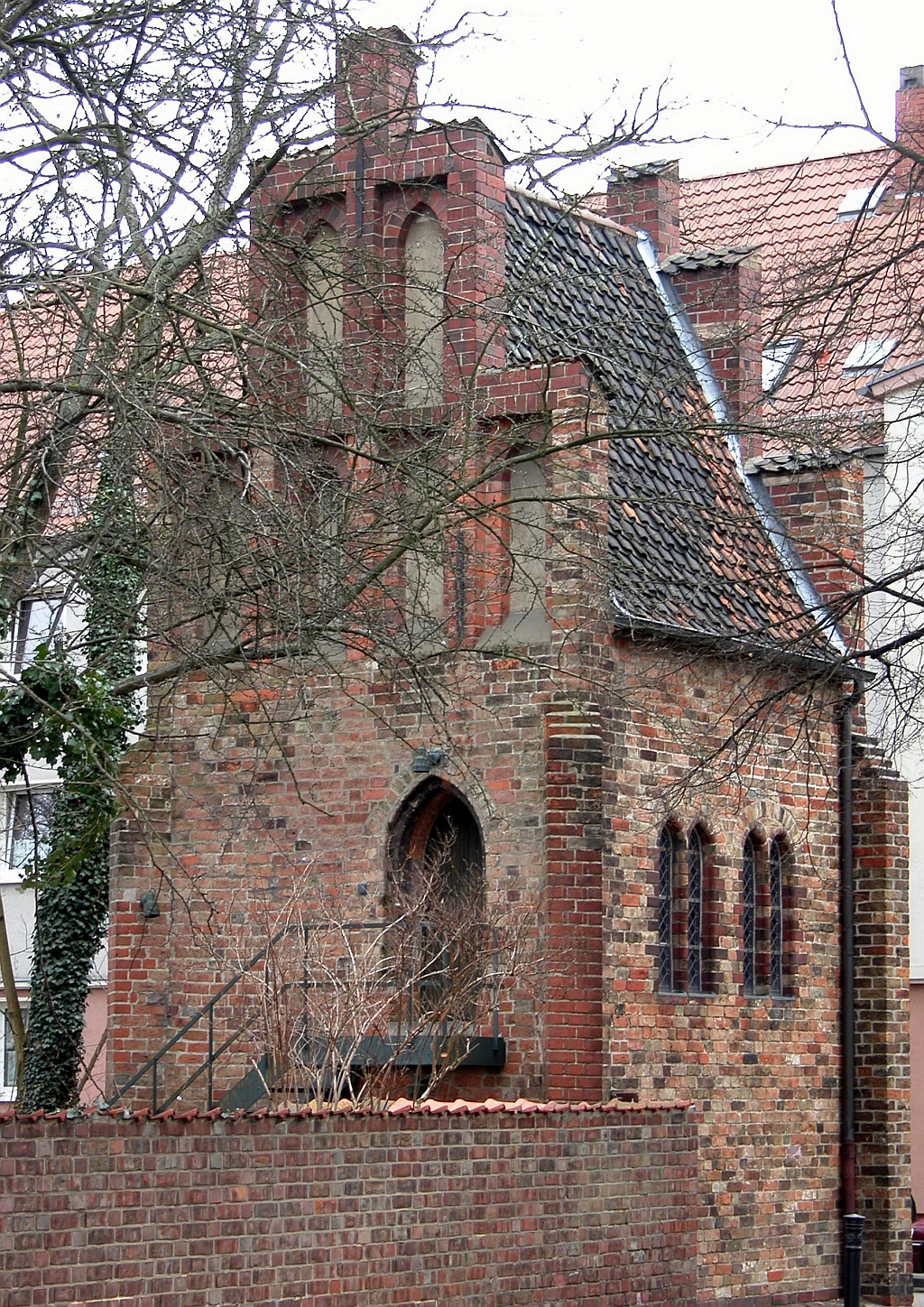
Unadorned north side with entrance and modern metal staircase (2006)

Magister Bruno Luckemann was followed by Ortghisus, who signed a similar document on 10 October 1336, and with it took over a stock of four more titles from the possession of his predecessor. Ortghisus († 1358) was followed by Klaus von Solvede († around 1360) and Ludolf von Steinfurt († probably 1393), from whose time, however, no news about the library has survived. Steinfurt's successor was Johann Ember.

=== Foundation ===
Ember, who had been the pastor of St. Andreas Church since about 1399, had a contract drawn up in 1412, of which a draft has been preserved. In it, the construction of a separate building for the library of St. Andreas Church is mentioned for the first time:

„De anno domini M^{0}CCCC^{0}XII^{0} / Ek her Johan Ember, regerer der parrekerken sante Andreas to Brunswyk, / hebbe to ghetekent und gegheven myner vorscreven kerken to brukinge des perners / und syner cappelane ychteswelke boke to blivende in eynem / huse, dat me noch buwen schal to ewyghen tyden, […] Wes / dar vorder to behof were to dem buwe des huses, dat wil ik, her Johan Ember, / eddir myne vormundere van mynem gude ghentzliken vulbryngen und utgheven, […]“

– Hermann Herbst: Die Bibliothek der Andreaskirche zu Braunschweig. pp. 314–315

"In the year of the Lord M0CCCC0XII0 [1412] / I, Mr. Johann Ember, the head of the parish church of St. Andreas at Brunswick, have assigned and given to my aforementioned church for the use of the priest and his chaplains some books [which] are to remain in a house which is still to be built for eternal endurance, [.... ] What is necessary beyond that for the building of the house, I, Mr. Johann Ember, or my abbots/administrators will bring to an end and pay from my property completely, [...]"

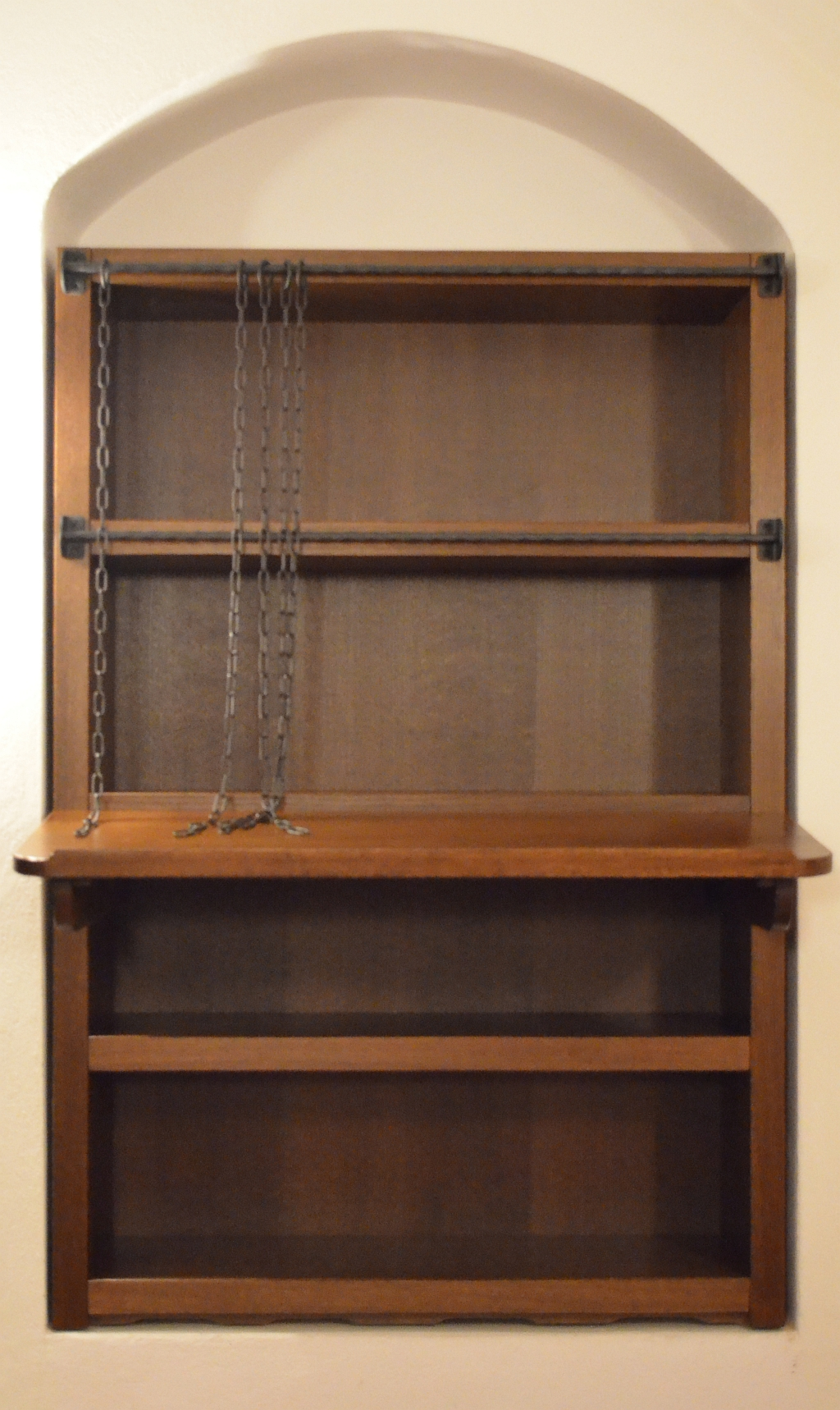
Reconstructed desk shelf for chain books on the 1st floor

Johann Ember, a book lover and collector of the late Middle Ages, thus wanted to donate the building and pay for its construction costs. In addition, he undertook to expand the library collection. Ember only demanded a contribution of ten marks from the church elders. Furthermore, the contract regulated the storage modalities of the works. Thus, each of the manuscripts was to be secured with a chain and stored on a lectern. The keys with which the volumes could be released from the chains were in the possession of the council of the new town and the church elders. This group of people was also contractually responsible for keeping an inventory of the library's holdings and for checking it several times a year. The key to the building itself was exclusively in the care of the respective parish priest of St. Andreas.

Ember expressly decreed that the books should be accessible not only to the clergy of the city but also to "all other venerable persons". Furthermore, he stipulated that - apart from himself - no one was allowed to borrow or remove volumes. It was therefore a reference library. For himself, Ember claimed the right to borrow a maximum of two books at a time, with the church elders to be informed in advance. Finally, the document also contained two inventory lists with detailed descriptions, one of those manuscripts that had already been in the church library from time immemorial, the other of those that Johannes Ember had taken over from his predecessor Ludolf von Steinfurt, and finally a list of the holdings that he himself intended to bequeath to the Liberei. In it, he had not only indicated the individual volumes with the works they contained, but also described them in detail, for example, their external characteristics, such as binding material and markings and whether the pages were paper or parchment. Texts that did not have a clear title or author had been marked by Ember with an incipit.

In "return" for this generous endowment, it was contractually agreed that memorials would be held twice a year for Johann Ember and his parents in St. Andreas Church.

The "old people" of St. Andreas Church, i.e. the church council, contributed ten marks to the construction costs, while Ember undertook to pay the remaining amount. Around Pentecost 1413, the shell of the building was probably completed. However, it was not until the middle of 1422, ten years after construction began, that the roof was covered and the interior furnishings brought in. This considerable delay in completion was caused by the so-called Braunschweig Pfaffenkrieg. Exactly when the construction work on the Liberei was completed can no longer be determined today.

After its completion, it was an early kind of "public library", thus making the Braunschweig Liberei one of the first libraries on German soil that could be used by the general public. It housed the book collection of St. Andreas Church, which was already large at the time.

=== Building and library stock ===
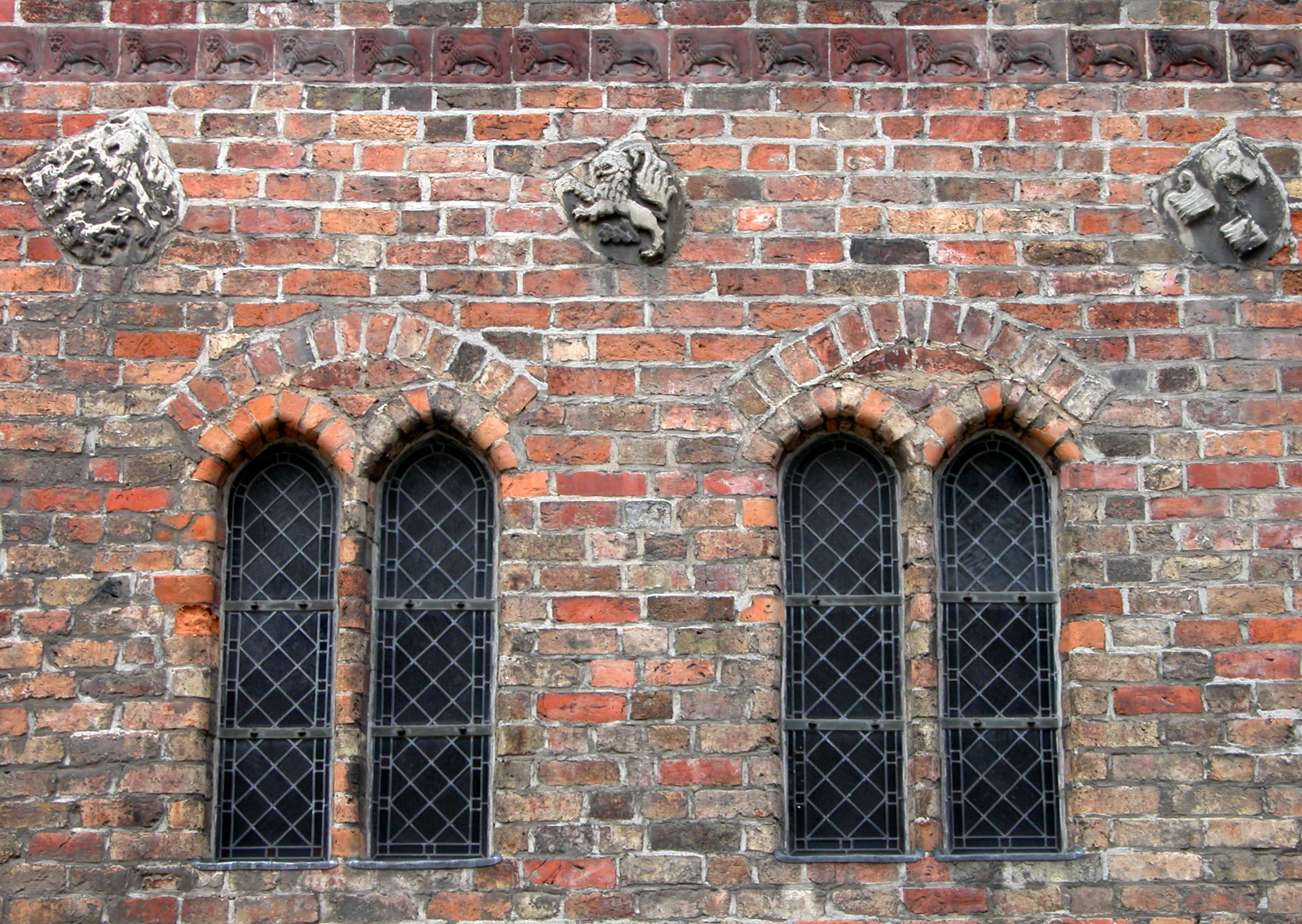
Detail of the south side: double windows on the upper floor, coat of arms and lion frieze

On 25 September 1412 a contract between Ember, the Alterleute, and the Lüneburg master builder, Meister Heinrich, Werner's son, regulated in detail how the building was to look and what materials it was to be made of. Thus, the depth of the foundation, the building material (teygelsteyne = brick), the thickness of the walls, the number of windows and pillars, the type of vault and the construction of a stone staircase inside were determined. The date of completion had been agreed to be Pentecost 1413.

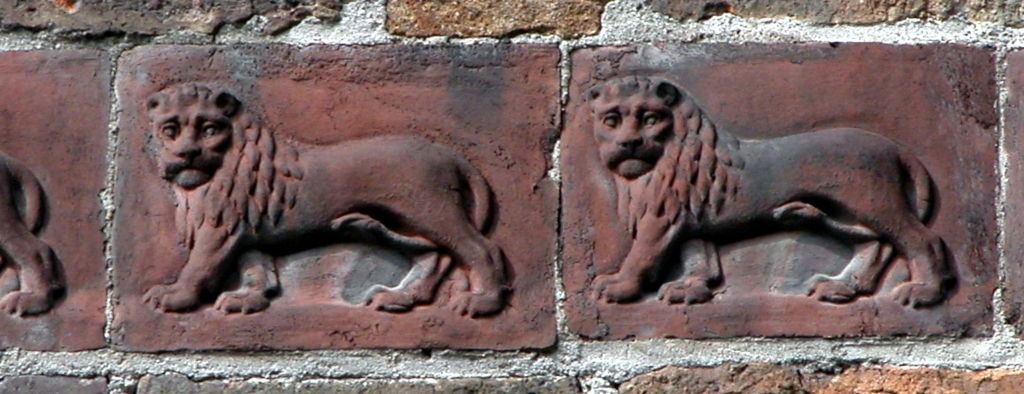
Lion frieze detail

The Liberei was built in the style of the North German Brick Gothic. The building has a special significance, as it is the only medieval brick building in Braunschweig and at the same time belongs to the southernmost ones in the distribution area of the Brick Gothic. Bricks were uncommon in the city at that time - in Braunschweig they mainly built timbered houses. Inside there were two rib-vaulted storey, which were separately accessible from the outside. The basement was partially built into the ground and had small double windows only on the east side.

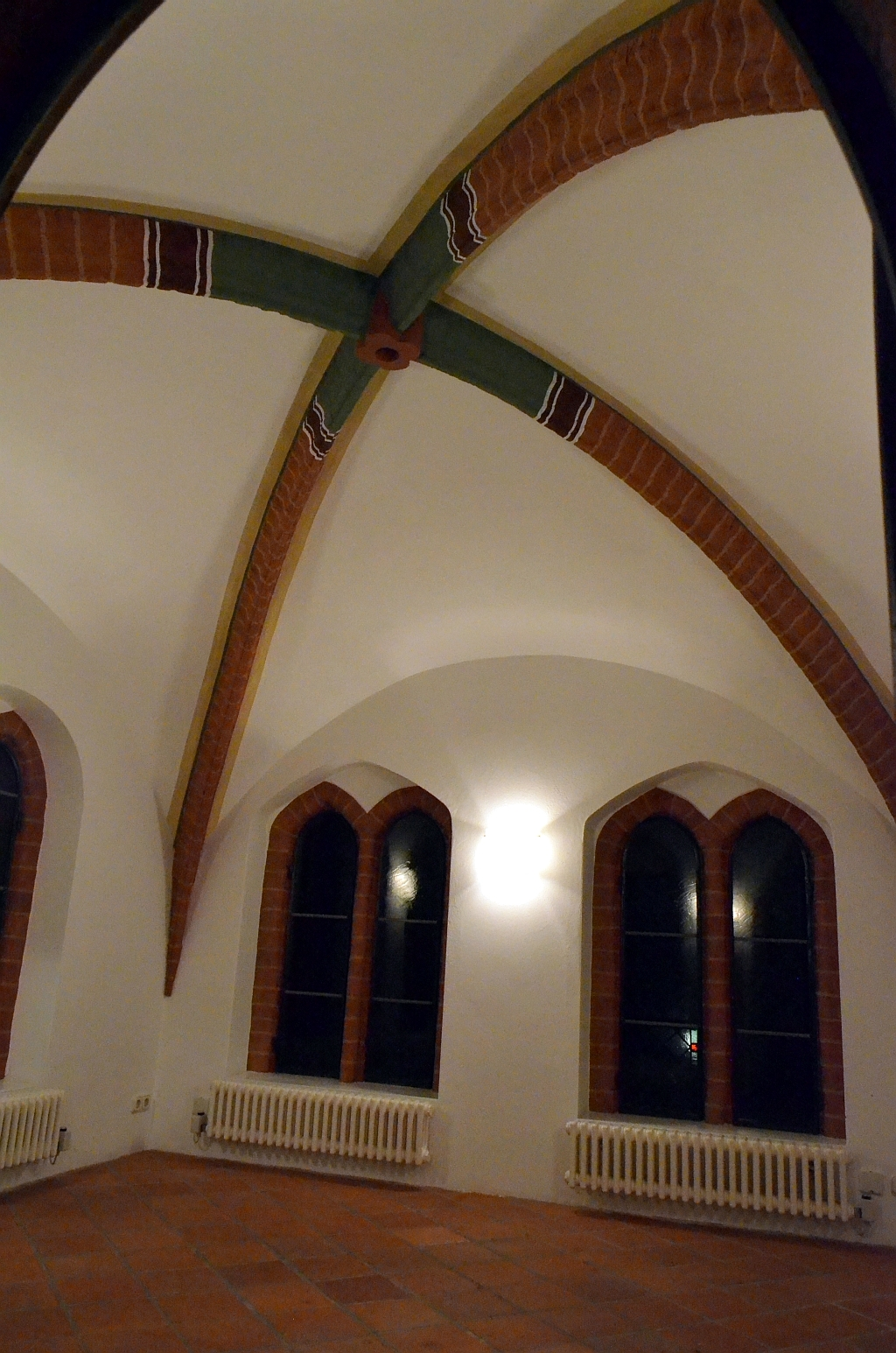
Interior, 1st floor

The building has Gothic stepped gables on both the north and south sides with glazed molded bricks and relief tiles, which particularly emphasize the verticals. In addition, on the south side there are profiled, pointed-arched ornamental cover. Below these, across almost the entire width of the building, runs a decorative frieze with 17 lions striding from right to left, facing the viewer. Whether this is the Brunswick lion or what the meaning of this frieze is, is unknown. Below the frieze are three coats of arms. The purpose of this array of coats of arms, like that of the striding lions, is not clearly understood and is the subject of much speculation, e.g., in relation to the Pfaffenkrieg and Ember's role in it. However, it seems certain that the left coat of arms is that of Duke Bernhard I (or the Blasiusstift). The middle one represents the lion of Brunswick and symbolizes the council. On the far right is that of the client of the building, priest Johann Ember, whose name means vat or bucket and whose coat of arms accordingly shows three buckets.

==== Completion delay ====
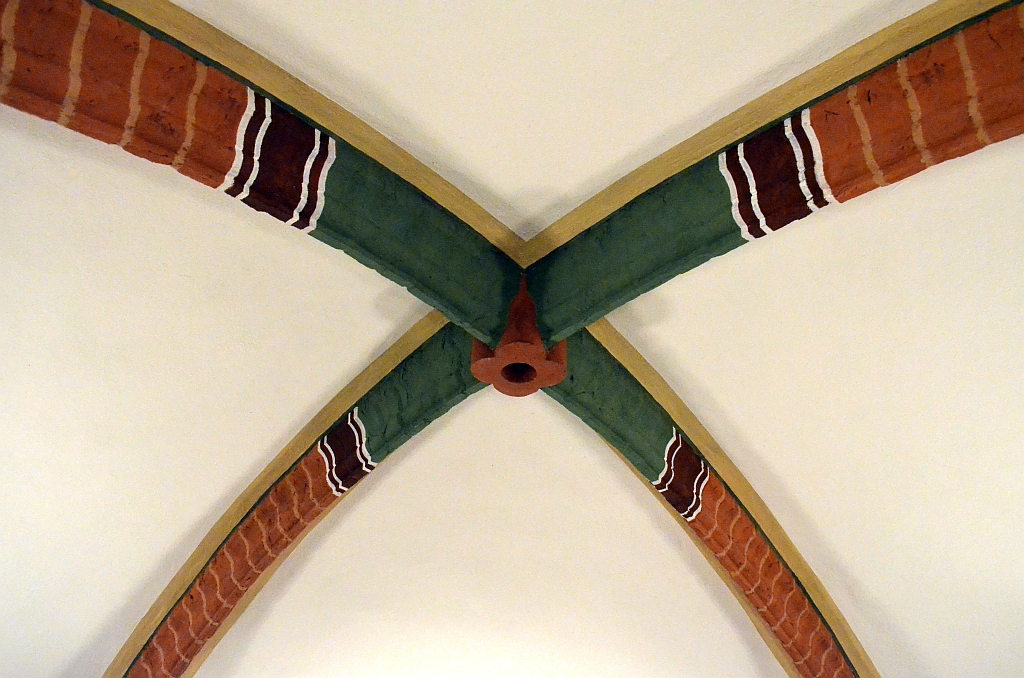
Restored ribbed vault

As contractually agreed, the shell of the building was probably completed around Pentecost 1413. But it was not until 25 April 1422, ten years after construction began, that another document states that Ember and the church elders had agreed on the final completion of the building. The document explicitly mentioned everything that was still missing to complete the work, namely stairs, windows, pews, lecterns, doors, roof, and locks.

This ten-year delay was caused by the Braunschweig War of the Priests. This inner-city "war" between the Blasiusstift and the Gemeinen Rat lasted from 1413 to 1420. It was not fought with weapons, however, but with words and ecclesiastical decrees as well as mutual anathema. It was triggered by the dispute over the filling of a vacant parish priest's position at St. Ulrici, which was subsequently followed by another dispute over the establishment of two new Latin schools. This resulted in an inner-city dispute that lasted a total of eight years. During the Pfaffenkrieg, numerous churches in the city, including St. Andreas Church, were closed. Because of a ban on Johann Ember, he had to flee Braunschweig in 1413 to the curia of the antipope John XXIII and could not return until 1420. At times, there were no services in either church for several years. This also explains the involuntary "building break" of several years due to the blockade attitude of the Andreas congregation. That the foundation of the Liberei should have been an "atonement" of Ember, as Meier and Steinacker assume, cannot be supported by the surviving documents. The church was built on the basis of the "Liberei".

It is no longer possible to determine exactly when construction work on the Liberei resumed, when it was fully completed, and when the building was finally handed over to its intended use. After its completion, the Liberei was an early kind of "public library" and thus one of the first libraries on German soil usable by (an albeit very limited circle of) the population.

Furthermore, the above-mentioned deed of 25 April 1422 is the last known document that was created during Ember's lifetime. A renewed bail deed dated 24 March 1424 already names Ember as "deceased" and is signed by his successor in office, Ludolf Quirre.

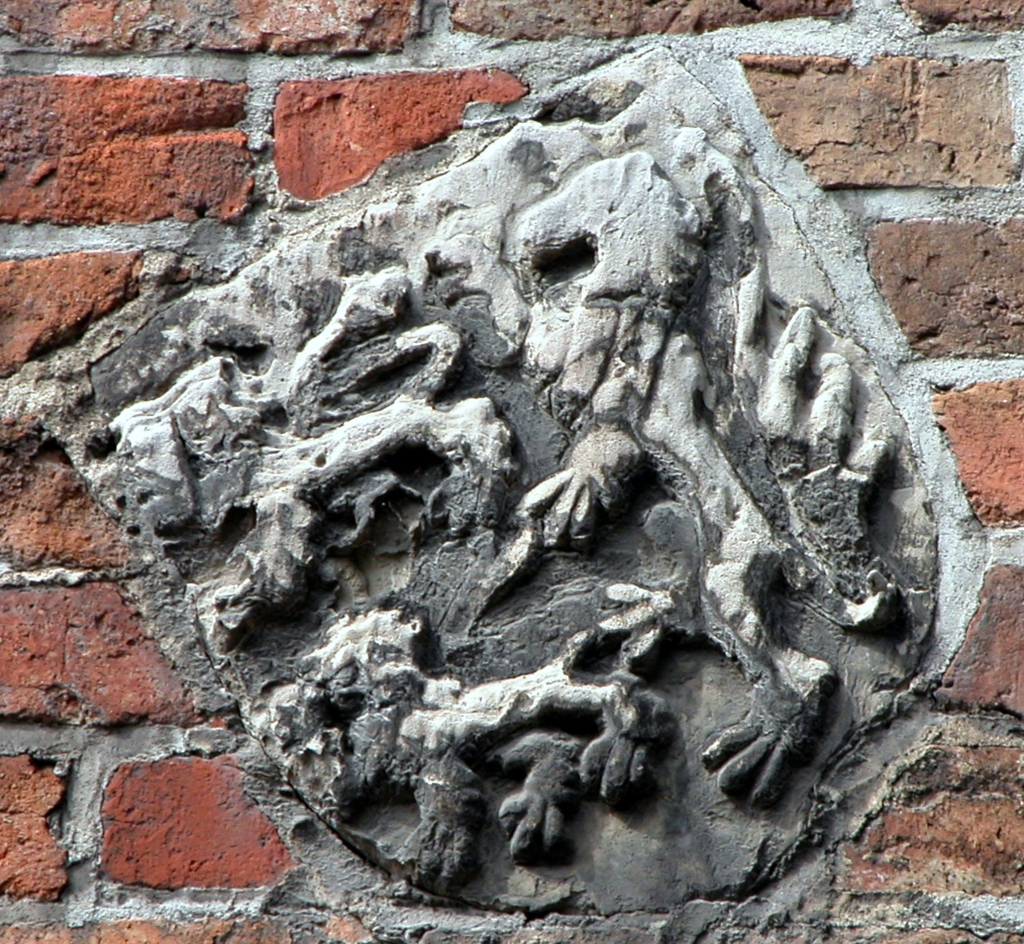
Ducal coat of arms

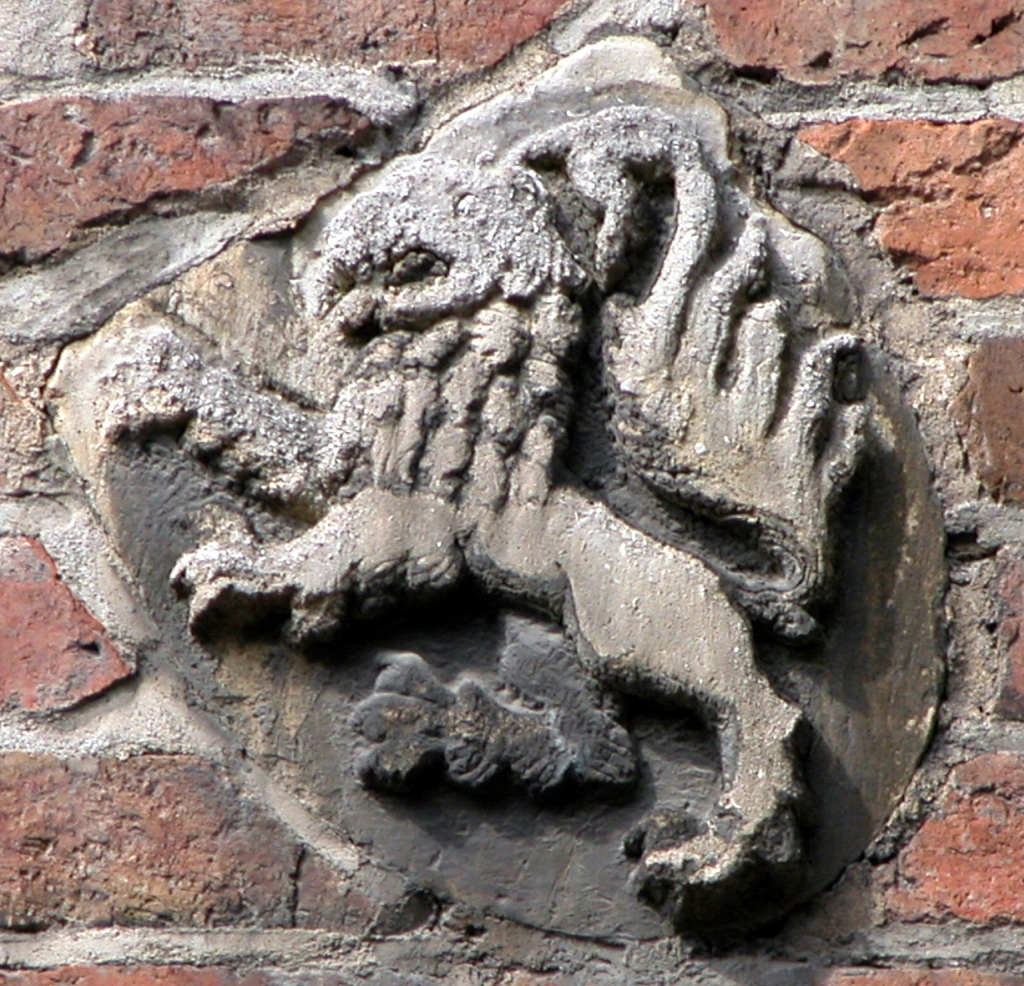
Council coat of arms

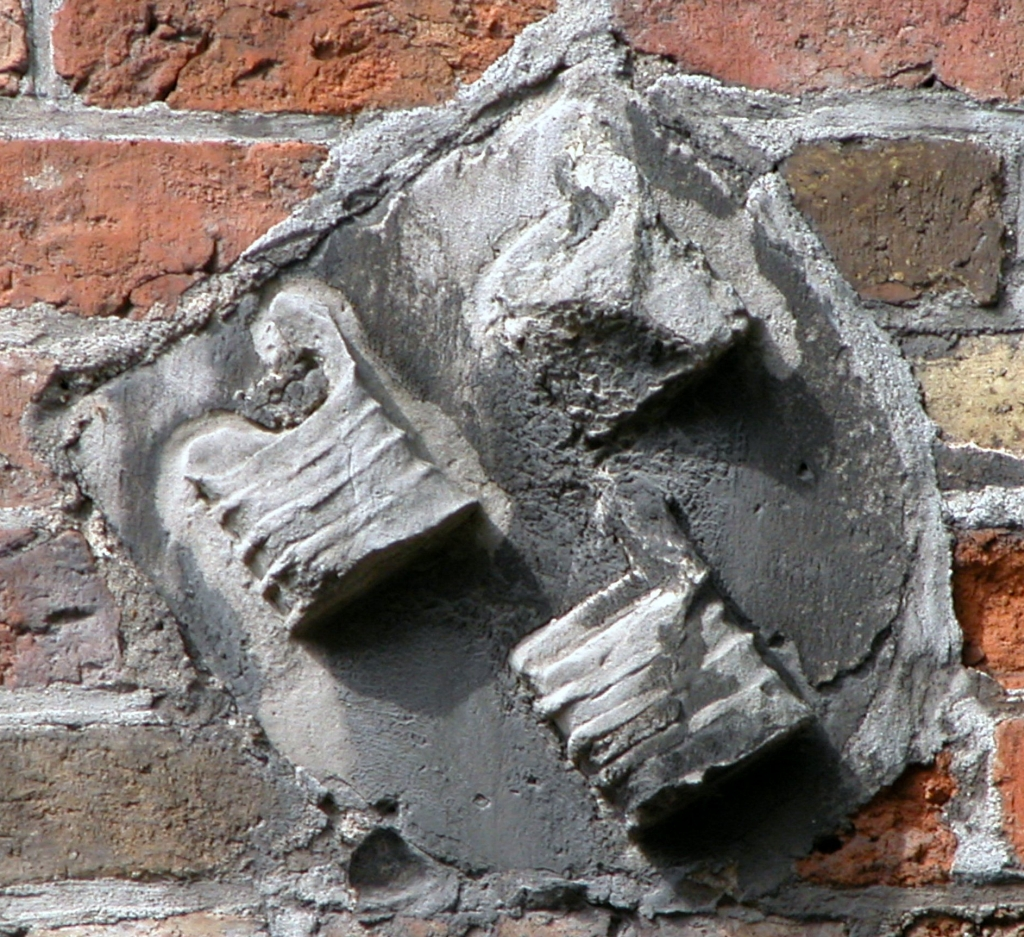
Supposed coat of arms Johann Embers

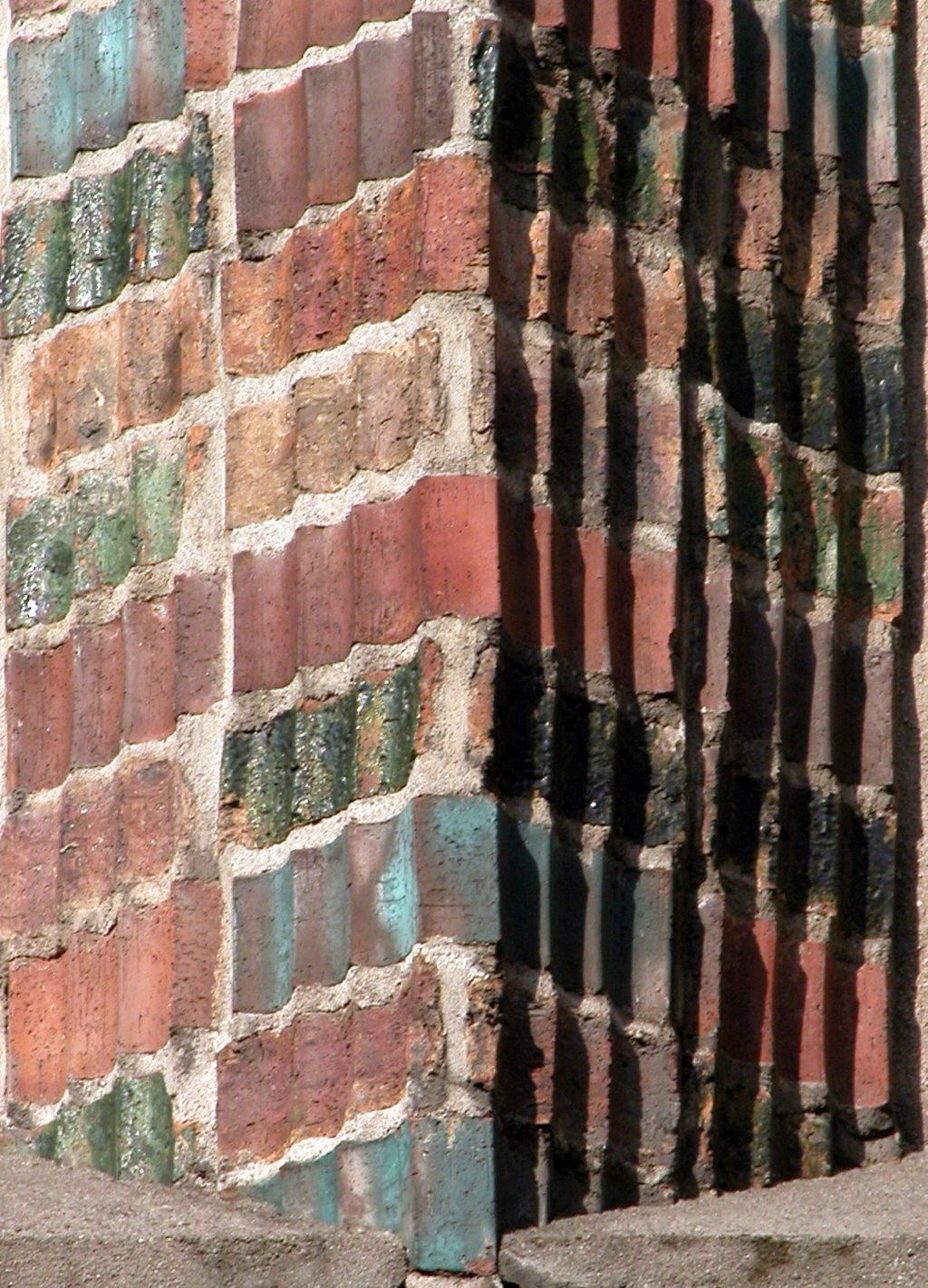
Glazed shaped tiles on the south gable

==== Donation of Gerwin von Hameln ====
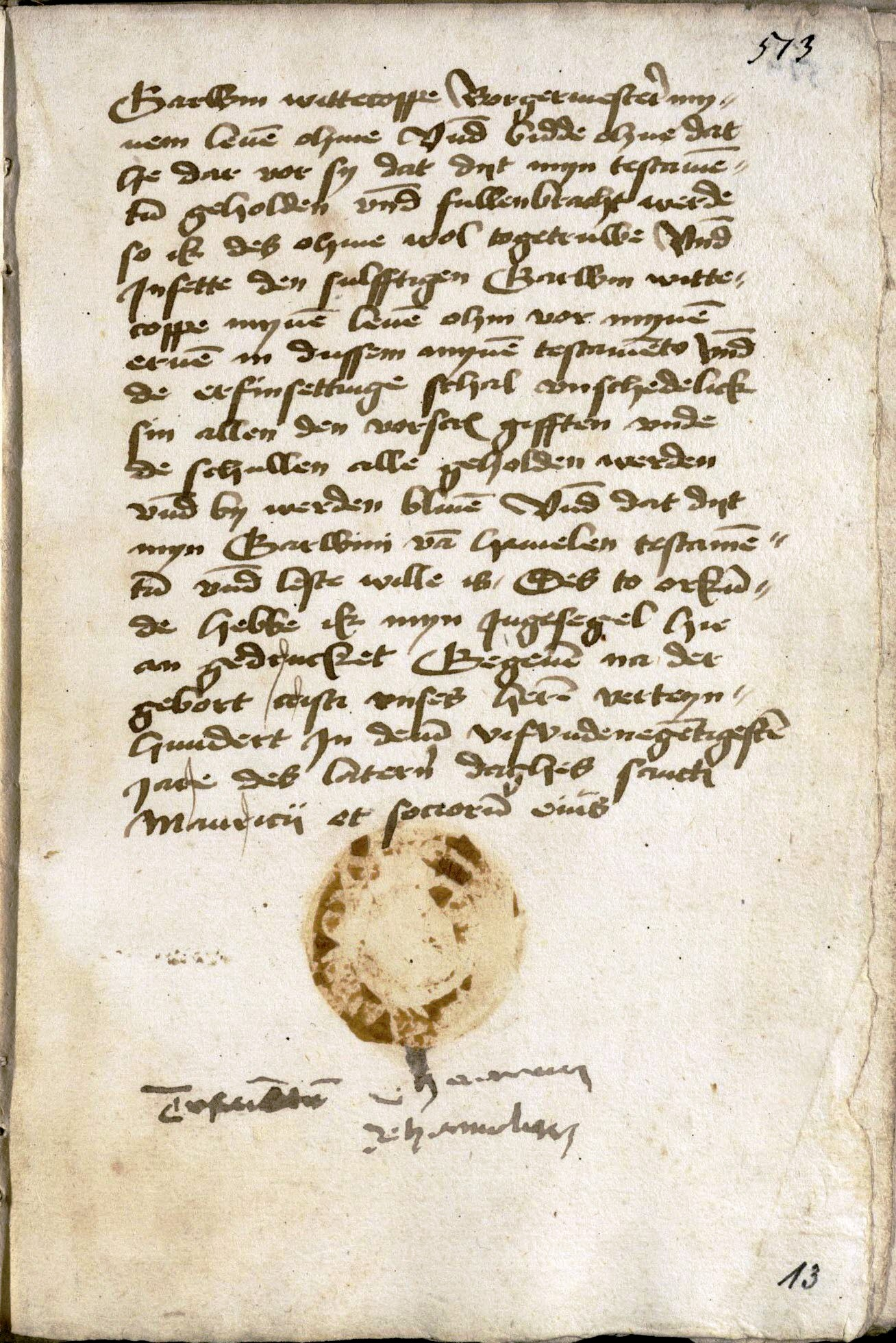
Last page from the will of Gerwin von Hameln dated 23 September 1495

Over a period of about 300 years, from the origin of the library under Magister Jordanus around 1309 to the end of the 16th century, the collection of manuscripts, incunable, etc. grew through acquisitions and donations.

The most important and extensive donation was that of the Braunschweig municipal clerk Gerwin von Hameln. It also marks the high point in the history of the Liberei. Gerwin came from a respected Brunswick family, which is documented since the beginning of the 14th century as citizens and house owners, first in the old town, later also in other parts of the city. Gerwin's family was the first to be founded in Brunswick. In 1438, at the age of about 23, Gerwin became town clerk of the Common Council and thus the highest official of the town. He held this position for a period of more than 50 years. In 1494, at the age of about 80, he wrote his will, which is still preserved today, and concluded it on 23 September 1495. In it he left "myne liberie to sunte Andrease" expressly "as eternal property" his collection of 336 books and manuscripts. The scope and quality of this collection were exceptional for the late 15th century, even beyond the borders of Brunswick. None of the town scribal libraries of the 15th and 16th centuries known today can be compared to that of Gerwin of Hamelin. It was one of the most important private libraries of the time.

Gerwin's will states:

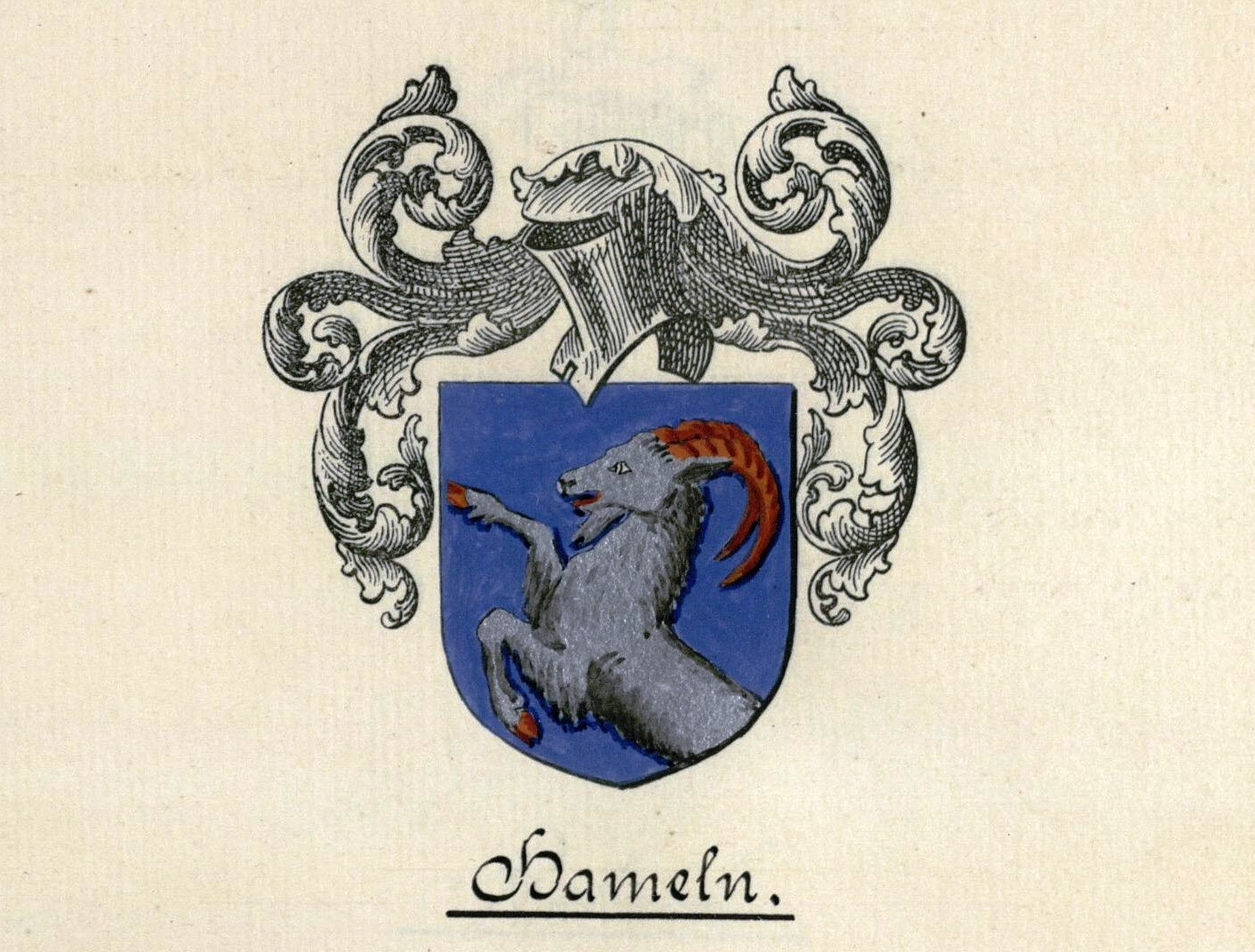
Coat of arms of the family von Hameln

„Item alle meyne boke, de ik up myne liberie to sunte Andrease gelacht hebbe, der in dem tale iß drehundert unde sesundedrittrich […] Ok moghen dusser liberie unde boeken gebruken darynne to studerende unde to lesende de erliken gelarden personen bynnen Brunswigk wesende darup to ghande, wu, vake unde wan se des begherende sin, geistlick unde wertlick unde sunderliken des ersamen rade to Brunswigk doctores, licentiaten, sindici, prothonotarii unde secretarii.“

– Anette Haucap-Naß: Der Braunschweiger Stadtschreiber Gerwin von Hameln und seine Bibliothek. pp. 297f

"Likewise all my books which I have deposited in my library at St. Andreas, which in number are Three Hundred and Thirty-Six [.... Furthermore, this library and the books therein may be used to study and read therein by respectable/prestigious learned persons residing within Brunswick who [may] go there as, where and when they wish, ecclesiastical and secular and especially of the honorable council of Brunswick doctors, licentiates, jurists, protonotaries and secretaries. "

Gerwin's collection consisted mainly of theological, canonical and Roman law works, which had to be distributed over both floors of the Liberei because of the large number. The library had grown so much through the donation that the small building could hardly hold the volumes. In contrast to the earlier endowments by Magister Jordanus, who had decreed that the volumes were only at the free disposal of the priests of St. Andreas Church, and John Embers, who had expanded the circle of users to include "all priests and venerable persons of the city", Gerwin of Hamelin explicitly stipulated that his family members were allowed to borrow volumes, which until then had not been permitted to anyone and ultimately contributed to the decline of the library.

Although the Council did not allow the will to stand, it nevertheless deposited it with the Council of the New Town on 29 December 1496. Why the will should be invalid according to the council is unknown. Gerwin von Hameln's collection, meanwhile, remained in the Liberei.

==== Liberei in the judgment of contemporary scholars ====
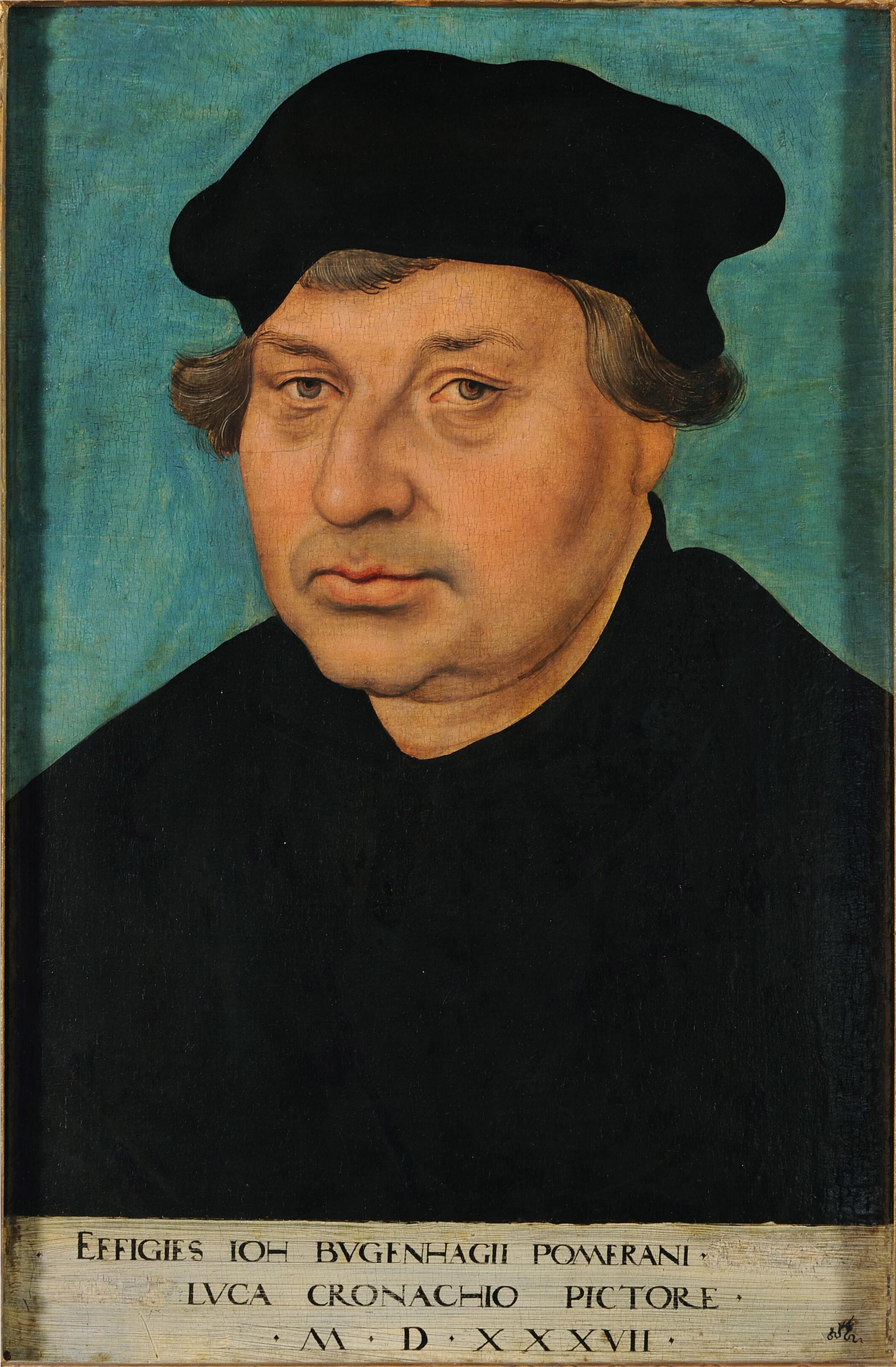
In 1531, reformer Johannes Bugenhagen explicitly referred to liberei as a source of knowledge in his Braunschweig Church Order.

Another, probably last, large donation of books took place 84 years later, in 1579. This time the volumes came from the estate of Johannes Alßhausen, secretary to the council of the city of Braunschweig. An inventory of the estate states:

„… und weil Johan Alßhausenn seliger alle seine buchere, klein und groß, und die tabulas mundi bey seinen lebenn in die lieberey zur kirchenn Andre in Braunschweig gegeben, daruber auch schriftlicher beweiß vonne ihme vorsiegelt vorhandenn […]“

– Paul Lehmann: Gerwin van Hameln und die Andreasbibliothek in Braunschweig. p. 572

"... and because Johan Alßhausenn blessed gave all his books, small and large, and the tabulas mundi during his life to the lieberey zur kirchenn Andre in Braunschweig, darüber auch schriftlicher beweiß vonne ihme vorsiegeltn vorhandenn [...]".

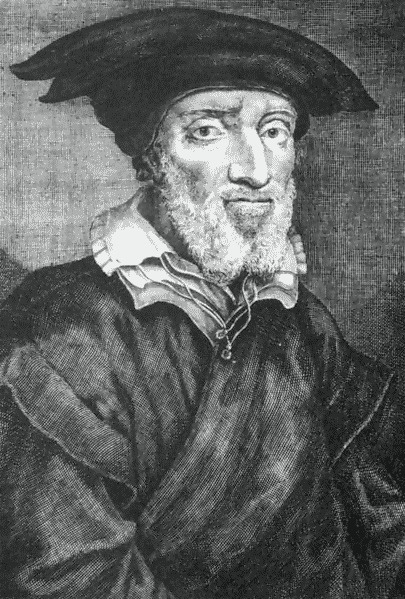
The theologian Matthias Flacius used the library around 1555 for his works on church history.

At this time, the Liberei already had the rank of an important site of research and enjoyed great prestige even beyond the borders of the city. The reformer Johannes Bugenhagen, who was active in Braunschweig in 1528, had recognized its importance and explicitly referred to the Liberei as a source of knowledge in his Braunschweig Church Order of 1531. Even at this time, however, its decline seems to have been clearly noticeable, for Bugenhagen wrote:

„Die liberey bei St. Andres sol man nit verfallen lassen, sondern lieber mit der Zeit, was gůte buecher sind, mehr darzů verschaffen, sonderlich solche, die nit yedermann zue bezalen hat […]. Diser liberey mit irer zuegehoer sol allen schatzkestenherren in allen pfarren bevolhen sein.“

– Paul Lehmann: Gerwin van Hameln und die Andreasbibliothek in Braunschweig. pp. 571f

"The Liberei at St. Andreas should not be allowed to fall into disrepair, but rather, over time, more of the good books should be acquired for it, especially those that not everyone can afford [...]. This Liberei with its accessories should be entrusted to all treasury lords in all parishes."

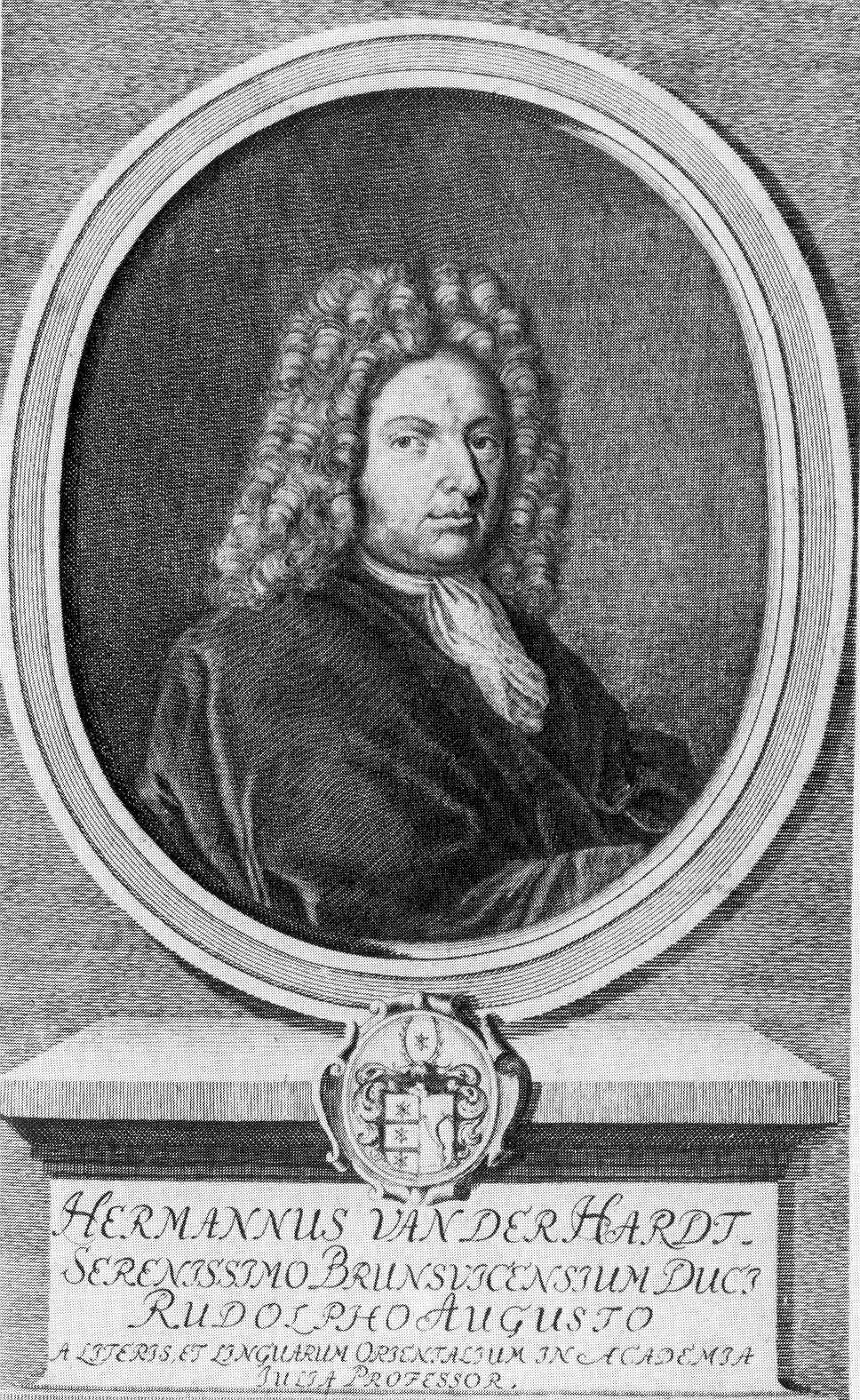
The scholar Hermann von der Hardt visited the Liberei several times around 1700 and lamented its deplorable condition.

Other scholars also used the library, such as the Protestant theologian Matthias Flacius around 1555, who also noticed that books were already missing from the collection. Hermann von der Hardt, professor at the University of Helmstedt and librarian at the university library there, visited the Liberei, called "Andreana" by him, several times to look for material for his work on the reform councils of Constance and Basel. In the preface to the 3rd part of the first volume of his "Magnum oecumenicum Constantiense concilium" Flacius describes in detail what he found in the Liberei. He was assisted by Heinrich Weiß, who had been pastor of St. Andreas since 1691 and had formerly been librarian to the Guelph Herzog Rudolf August of Brunswick-Wolfenbüttel. Hardt referred to what he found as "reliquiae," or "remains" of what had once constituted this library and established its fame. In a letter to the duke on 22 August 1695, he complained about the deplorable condition of the building and library holdings. On 13 September 1695 Hardt enquired of the duke: "How did it go with the Andreana in Brunswick, from which His Serene Highness still saved some good relics?" Hardt probably saw to it that between 1702 and 1706, most of the library's remaining holdings were transferred to the "Bibliotheca Rudolphea," Duke Rudolf August's private library, which in turn was absorbed into the library of the University of Helmstedt in 1702 and finally into the Herzog August Library in Wolfenbüttel. Another part went to the library of the University of Helmstedt and a smaller part of the Liberei stock probably passed directly into Hardt's own book collection. When the library of his nephew Anton Julius von der Hardt, also a professor in Helmstedt, was auctioned off in 1786, it contained quite a few works from the possession of Gerwin von Hameln.

In 1714, the polymath Caspar Calvör wrote to his father Joachim Calvör, pastor at St. Andreas, about Liberei:

"Before the Reformation, secular priests and vicars lived there as in a collegiate house and made use of the enormous books that were locked on chains on the hard-situated library or old library. – Hermann Herbst: Die Bibliothek der Andreaskirche zu Braunschweig. p. 337

=== Decline ===
==== Building fabric ====
In the decades following the Alßhausen donation of 1579, news about the Liberei gradually became sparser. Mostly it was a matter of disputes between the descendants of Gerwin of Hamelin and the council of the new town as well as the old people of St. Andreas Church, who had to pay for the maintenance of the building as well as for the care and protection of the library stock.

Gerwin von Hameln appointed his nephew Gerwin Wittekop († 1510) as universal heir and executor. He was the mayor of Hagen, which bordered the new town directly to the east. One of his grandsons was Heinrich Wittekop († 1608), a councillor of the new town. Due to their special position in the city, Gerwin's descendants considered both the building and the library it contained to be their family property. This repeatedly led to disputes over many years. Thus, on the part of the New Town Council, attempts were made several times to use the Liberei for other purposes: In 1585, the Council intended to convert the building into two sheetmakers' houses, but Heinrich Wittekop was able to prevent this. On 27 March 1587 Wittekop complained in writing in a harsh tone that both the preachers of St. Andreas Church and the mayor and chamberlain of the Neustadt were "ungrateful" and were "shamelessly" "sinning" against the foundation. Around 1600, a latrine was to be installed directly adjacent to the Liberei, which, in Wittekop's opinion, not only violated the city's building regulations, but also made the continued use of the library impossible due to the odor nuisance.

These ongoing disputes, most recently at the end of 1602 because of (allegedly wantonly) broken window panes and subsequent rainwater penetration, finally escalated: on 22 December 1602 the council ultimatively demanded that the Wittekop family repair the damage caused by the end of the year. After letting the deadline pass without complying with the demand, the 76-year-old Heinrich Wittekop filed an objection on 4 January 1603, at the same time repudiating any debt or obligation. As a result, the Wittekop family was finally deprived of the patronage rights to the Liberei. Subsequently, the Liberei seems to have been closed for several years. After Wittekop's death, his descendants tried again to assert claims in 1609, but were finally rejected. Since no one felt responsible for the upkeep of the building and library as a result of the disputes, the Liberei gradually became so dilapidated that it finally fell to the New Town Council around 1700.

In 1753, the remains of the library were cleared out. Subsequently, the building served first as a washhouse, later as a parish widow's house. It was not until 1862 that it was restored by city architect Carl Tappe. Afterwards, the St. Andreas Church set up its registry there. By 1941, the building served only as a storage place for garden tools.

==== Inventory losses ====
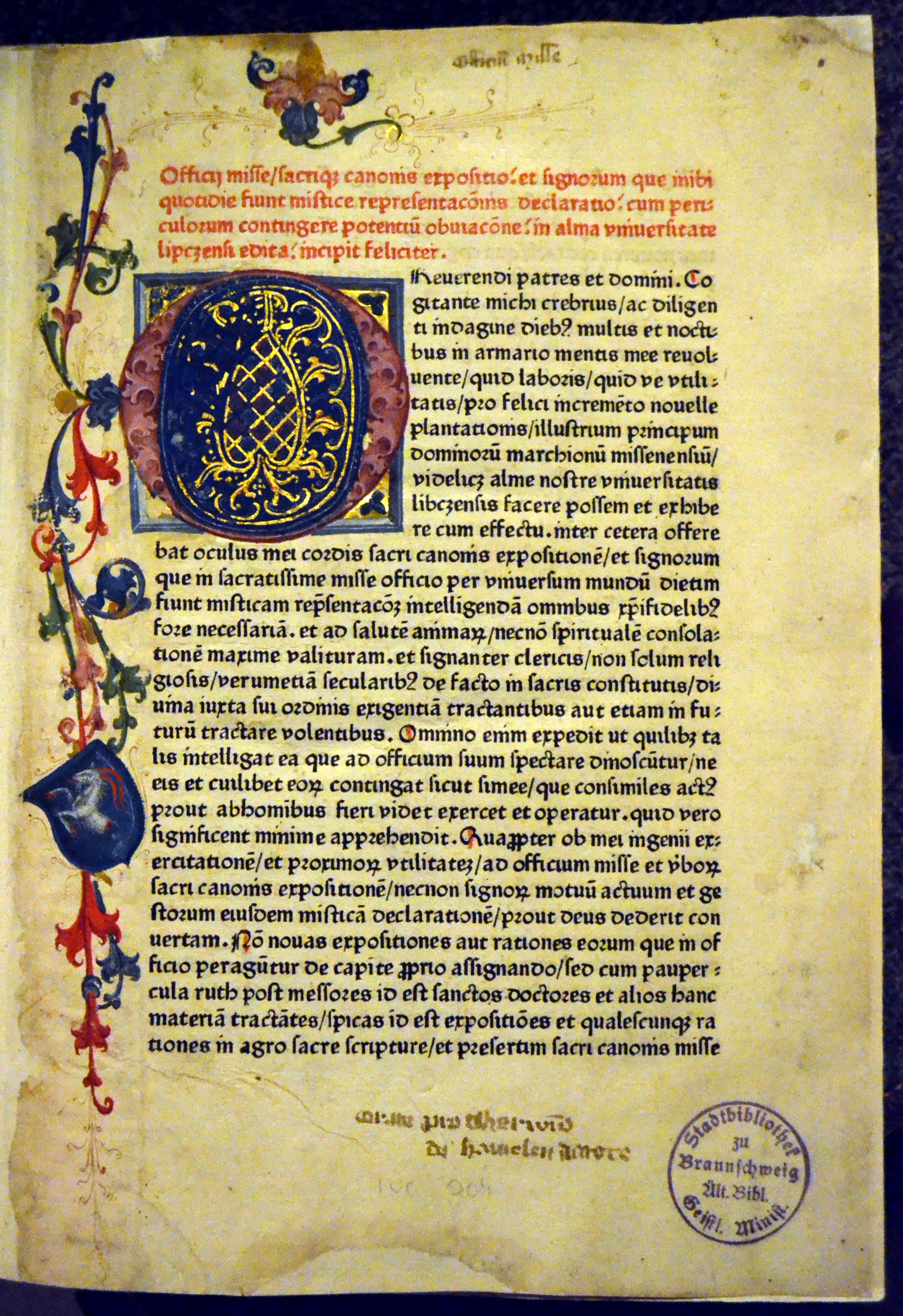
First page of an incunable (before 1474) from the library of Gerwin of Hamelin. His family coat of arms can be seen in the left margin and the handwritten addition Orate pro Gherwino de Hamelen datore in the lower margin. The volume is now in the Braunschweig City Library.

The donation of Gerwin of Hameln was at the same time a high point, but also a turning point in the importance of the Liberei. Soon after Gerwin's death, its gradual decline began. Although Braunschweig was aware of the importance of the library in scholarly circles even outside the city limits, care and protection of the building and collection were neglected. Also, it was precisely the publicity of the book collection that led to creeping losses through theft over decades, as the books continued to be in the public domain. Thus, other book collectors stole works for their own libraries, or volumes were stolen because the paper or parchment they contained could continue to be used.

It is unknown how large the total inventory of manuscripts was, since a number of works were lost during the lifetime of Ember and his successors, while new acquisitions were made at the same time. Herbst mentions "about 400 volumes, a large part of them in folio format." After Johann Ember's death, his successor Quirre initially administered Ember's estate, and he was also responsible for the care of the library. From Quirre's time (1423-1463) almost nothing is known about the history of the Liberei. He also appears to have been the last to sign a bond document upon acquisition, as his predecessors had to do. From Ember, he took over a collection of 52 volumes. The inventory list that Quirre signed represents the most recent library inventory today. The original is preserved as "Sunte Andreases Bok." A comparison of the inventories in Ember's time and the list Quirre drew up when he took office in early 1424 makes it clear that works were already missing at that time. Moreover, Quirre's information is often inaccurate or even wrong. Frequently, for example, bound works are missing.

Gerwin von Hameln had granted his descendants a special right in his will in 1496: they had the sole right to borrow volumes. A right that had only been granted once before, namely to Johann Ember, who had stipulated this right as a benefactor.

In 1753, Duke Charles I of Brunswick-Wolfenbüttel issued a decree stating that all church libraries in the city of Brunswick were to be dissolved in order to merge their holdings into the library of the Spiritual Ministry at the Church of the Brothers. With this, Charles I effectively dissolved the Liberei.

=== Preserved remnants of the Liberei ===
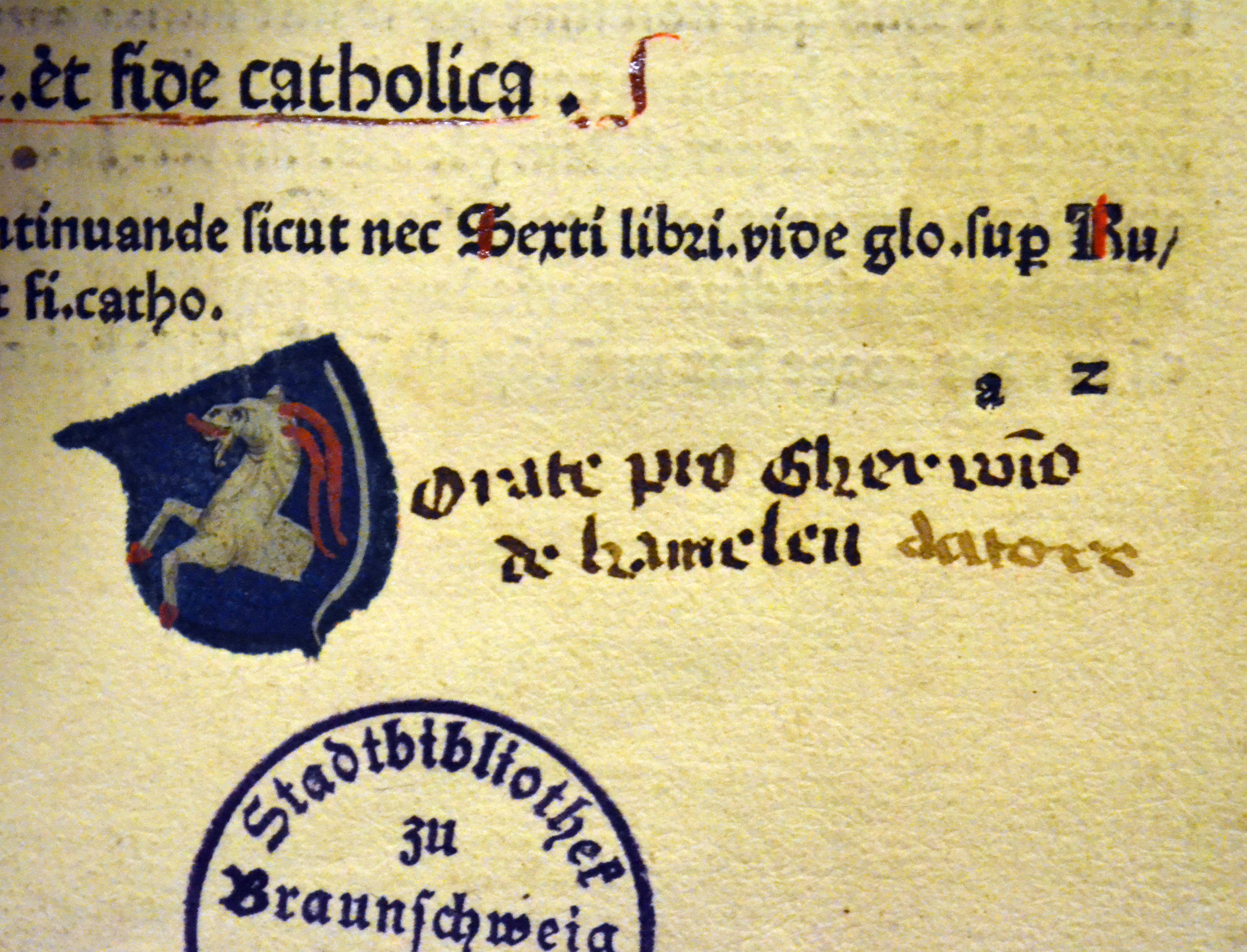
"Orate pro Gherwino de hamelen datore" (Pray for Gerwin of Hamelin, the donor), family coat of arms and stamp of the Braunschweig City Library, where the work is now located.

Since there are no reliable figures on the total, let alone remaining stock of the Liberei, almost only the remaining stock of Gerwin of Hamelin's volumes can be examined today. According to today's research, 137 (41%) of Gerwin's 336 volumes from 1495 are still preserved. Large parts of them are located in the Braunschweig City Library and the Herzog August Library in Wolfenbüttel. Smaller holdings are in the Göttingen State and University Library, the State Library of Württemberg in Stuttgart, the Baden State Library in Karlsruhe, and the Anhalt State Library in Dessau-Roßlau.

Volumes from the collection of Gerwin of Hamelin can be clearly assigned on the basis of individual characteristics. Thus, the book cut is labeled, and all are marked with the family coat of arms, "... which shows on a blue background a half to the left rising white ibex with red tongue, red horns and hooves. Next to it is written all times by his hand: Orate pro Gherwino de Hamelen d[on]atore. [Pray for Gerwin von Hameln, the donor." The coat of arms is always on the first page, occasionally also on the endpapers or title page. In addition, many volumes contain marginal notes by Gerwin, such as "perlegi" ("read") or "perlegi totum librum" ("the whole book read").

=== War damage and restoration ===
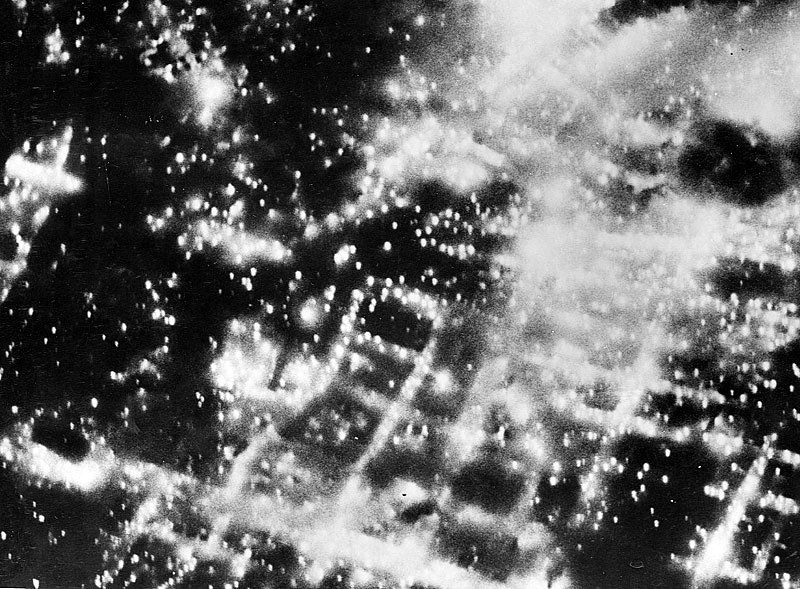
The burning city center of Braunschweig after the bombing raid of 15 October 1944

During World War II, Braunschweig's inner city, which includes the Neustadt, was extensively destroyed by the numerous air raids of the Royal Air Force and the United States Army Air Forces. The Liberei was particularly badly damaged by the bombings of 10 and 15 February 1944. The structure burned out, the vaults collapsed, the saddle roof burned off, and both gables were badly damaged, with parts of the south gable falling onto Kröppelstraße.

In view of the severe damage to the building, shortly after the end of the war preservationists made the proposal to leave only the north gable and to restore the badly damaged south gable and the likewise damaged side walls using other materials. However, this proposal was not implemented due to the historical significance of the building. In 1947, it was initially possible to secure the structure's existence. However, the outer appearance of the former library could not be restored in a simplified form until 1963/64. It was not until then that brickworks were again technically capable of producing and glazing the molded bricks. Thanks to private donations, but also public funds, the interior restoration could be carried out in 1984/85, and an external staircase - this time made of steel - was again erected on the north side in order to be able to reach the interior.

In the following years, the Liberei was occasionally used by youth groups or for meetings of the church council. Art actions and smaller celebrations also took place in the premises. The originally planned establishment of a stone museum could not be realized so far due to lack of money.

== Bibliography ==
- Elmar Arnhold: Liberei. In: Mittelalterliche Metropole Braunschweig. Architektur und Stadtbaukunst vom 11. bis 15. Jahrhundert. Appelhans Verlag, Braunschweig 2018, ISBN 978-3-944939-36-0, pp. 196–197.
- Reinhard Dorn: Mittelalterliche Kirchen in Braunschweig. Verlag CW Niemeyer, Hameln 1978, ISBN 3-87585-043-2.
- Hermann Dürre: Geschichte der Stadt Braunschweig im Mittelalter. Braunschweig 1861. (Digitalisat)
- Anette Haucap-Naß: Der Braunschweiger Stadtschreiber Gerwin von Hameln und seine Bibliothek. (= Wolfenbütteler Mittelalter-Studien. Band 8). Harrassowitz Verlag, Wiesbaden 1995, ISBN 3-447-03754-7.
- Hermann Herbst: Die Bibliothek der Andreaskirche zu Braunschweig. In: Zentralblatt für Bibliothekswesen. Jg. 58, Heft 9/10, Sept./Okt. 1941, pp. 301–338 (online).
- Jürgen Hodemacher: Braunschweigs Straßen – ihre Namen und ihre Geschichten. Band 1: Innenstadt. Cremlingen 1995, ISBN 3-927060-11-9.
- Wolfgang Kimpflinger: Denkmaltopographie Bundesrepublik Deutschland. Baudenkmale in Niedersachsen. Band 1.1: Stadt Braunschweig. Teil 1, Verlag CW Niemeyer, Hameln 1993, ISBN 3-87585-252-4.
- Paul Lehmann: Gerwin van Hameln und die Andreasbibliothek in Braunschweig. In: Zentralblatt für Bibliothekswesen. Jg. 52, 1935, pp. 565–586.
- Paul Jonas Meier, Karl Steinacker: Die Bau- und Kunstdenkmäler der Stadt Braunschweig. 2., erweiterte Auflage. Braunschweig 1926.
- Heinrich Nentwig: Das ältere Buchwesen in Braunschweig. Beitrag zur Geschichte der Stadtbibliothek. Nach archivalischen Quellen und anderen Urkunden. (XXV. Beiheft zum Centralblatt für Bibliothekswesen). Otto Harrassowitz, Leipzig 1901, pp. 19–38. (Digitalisat)
- Brigide Schwarz: Hannoveraner in Braunschweig. Die Karrieren von Johann Ember († 1423) und Hermann Pentel († nach 1463). In: Horst-Rüdiger Jarck (Hrsg.): Braunschweigisches Jahrbuch für Landesgeschichte. Band 80, Selbstverlag des Braunschweigischen Geschichtsvereins, Braunschweig 1999, ISSN 1437-2959, pp. 9–54 (Digitalisat)
- Werner Spieß: Geschichte der Stadt Braunschweig im Nachmittelalter. Vom Ausgang des Mittelalters bis zum Ende der Stadtfreiheit 1491–1671. 2. Band, Braunschweig 1966.
