= Hermann von der Hardt =

German historian and orientalist

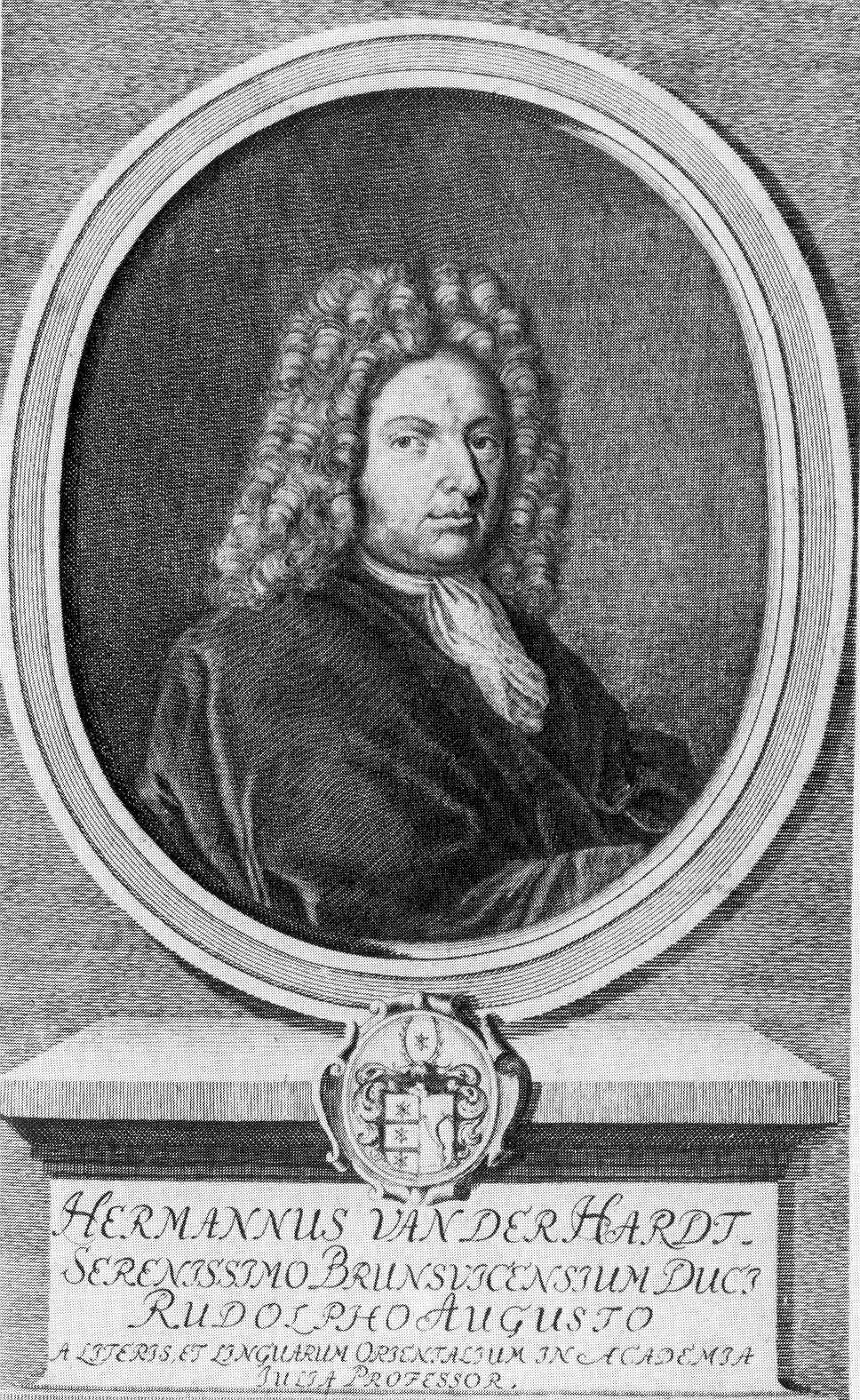
Hermann von der Hardt.

Hermann von der Hardt (November 15, 1660 – February 28, 1746) was a German historian and orientalist.

He was born at Melle, in Westphalia (now in Lower Saxony). He studied oriental languages at the universities of Jena and Leipzig, and in 1690 he was called to the chair of oriental languages at Helmstedt. He resigned his position in 1727, but lived at Helmstedt until his death.

Among his numerous writings the following deserve mention:

- Autographa Lutheri aliorumque celebrium virorum, ab anno 1517 ad annum 1546, Reformationis aetatem et historiam egregie iliustrantia (1690–1691)
- Magnum oecumenicum Constantiense concilium (1697–1700)
- Hebraeae linguae fundamenta (1694)
- Syriacae linguae fundamenta (1694)
- Elementa Chaldaica (1693)
- Historia litteraria reformationis (1717)
- Enigmata prisci orbis (1723)

Hardt left in manuscript a history of the Reformation which is preserved in the Helmstedt Juleum.
