= Hortus Sanitatis =

Natural history encyclopedia, published in 1491

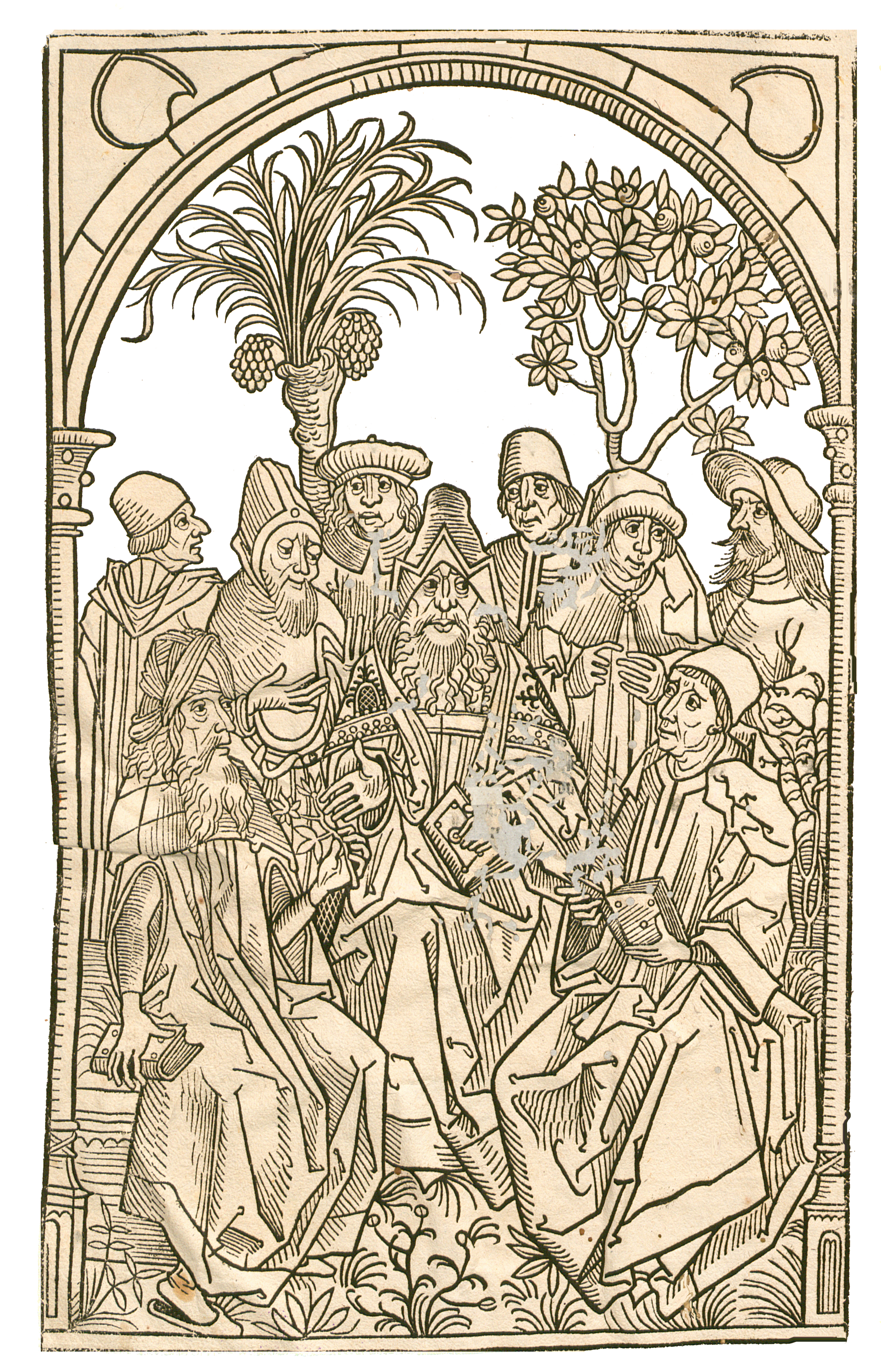
Hortus sanitatis. Mainz 1491 Titlepage

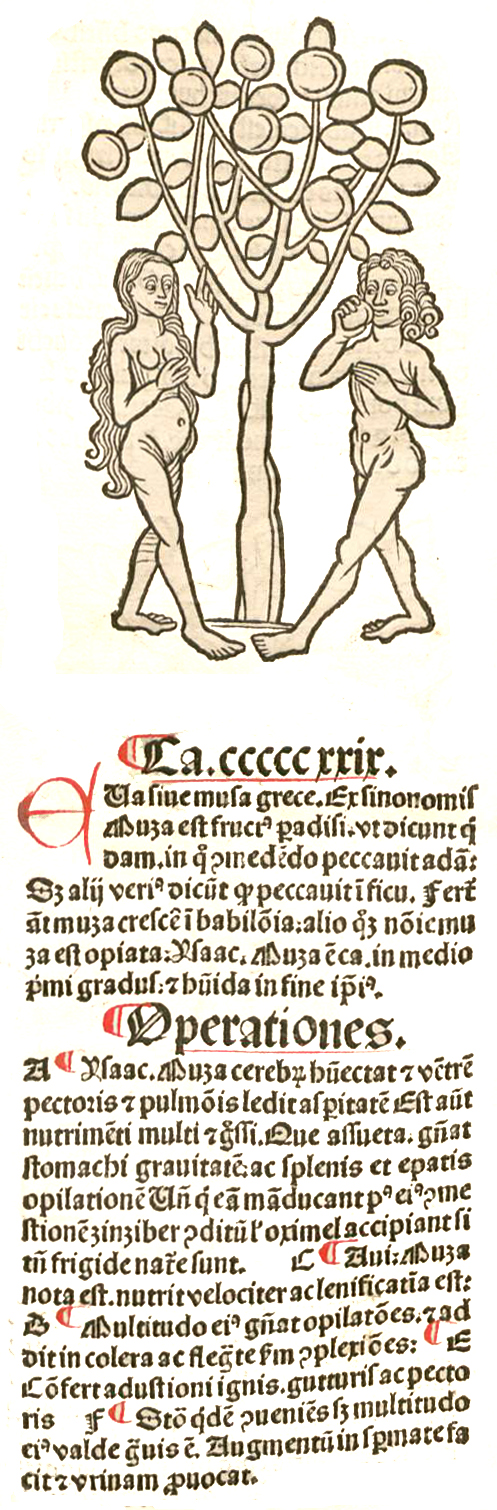
Fruits of Paradise. Hortus sanitatis 1491

The Hortus Sanitatis (also written Ortus; Latin for The Garden of Health), a Latin natural history encyclopaedia, was published by Jacob Meydenbach in Mainz, Germany in 1491.

It describes species in the natural world along with their medicinal uses and modes of preparation. It followed the Latin Herbarius moguntinus (1484) and the German Gart der Gesundheit (1485), that Peter Schöffer had published in Mainz. Unlike these earlier works, besides dealing with herbs, the Hortus sanitatis deals with animals, birds, fish and stones too. Moreover the author does not restrict himself to dealing only with real creatures, but also includes accounts of mythical animals such as the dragon, harpy, hydra, myrmecoleon, phoenix, and zitiron.

== Author ==
The author is unknown. Occasionally the Frankfurt physician Johann Wonnecke von Kaub is incorrectly named as the author.

== Contents ==
Set in two columns, the work contains five sections describing simple drugs used for therapy:

1. De Herbis with 530 chapters on herbs.
2. De Animalibus with 164 chapters on land animals (Chapter 1: De homo).
3. De Avibus with 122 chapters on birds and other airworthy animals.
4. De Piscibus with 106 chapters on aquatic animals.
5. De Lapidibus with 144 chapters on semi-precious stones, ores and minerals.

As appendix a treatise on uroscopy and several detailed registers.

Set in two columns, each chapter is headed by a picture. The following text gives a general description of the related simple drug and under the title of »oparetiones« a list of its effects on the human body.

The plants of the section "De Herbis" were determined by B. and H. Baumann (2010, pp. 205–222) according to current binominal nomenclature.

== Sources ==
The author has composed the Hortus sanitatis out of well-known medieval encyclopaedias, such as the Liber pandectarum medicinae omnia medicine simplicia continens of Matthaeus Silvaticus (14th c.) and the Speculum natural of Vincent of Beauvais (13th century).

The text of uroscopy at the end of the Hortus sanitatis was borrowed from a text that circulated in numerous manuscripts under the names of »Zacharias de Feltris« or »Bartholomew of Montagna«.

A Latin manuscript, dated 1477, which already contains the textual core of Hortus sanitatis, was initially regarded as a possible template for the printing, but is now held for an independent copy of a Latin »circa-instans-manuscript«.

== Publication history ==
Incunabule

- Mainz. Jacob Meydenbach (June 23) 1491
- Strasbourg. Anonymous 1496
- Strasbourg. Anonymous 1497-1498 (with woodcuts from the workshop of Johann Grüninger, which were also used to illustrate the Kleines Destillierbuch of Hieronymus Brunschwig (1500).
- Strasbourg. Anonymous 1499 (Johann Prüß der Ältere?)
- Paris. Antoine Vérard 1500 Ortus sanitatis translate de latin en françois

16th century

- Strasbourg after 1500 (with woodcuts from the workshop of Hans Grüninger).
- Venice (Bernhardinus Benalius and John de Cereto de Tridino) 1511 (4th reprint: Venice 1611); Reprint (in two volumes) Würzburg 1978.
- Strasbourg 1517
- Paris 1539 Phillipe le Noir Le jardin de santé

Sections two to five of the Hortus sanitatis (section one – herbs – lacking). Latin

- Strasbourg. Matthias Apiarius 1536

Sections two to five of the Hortus sanitatis (section one – herbs – lacking). German

- Straßburg 1529. Hans Grüninger
- Straßburg 1529. Balthasar Beck. Gart der gesuntheit. zu latin …
- Straßburg 1536. Mathias Apiarius. Gart der gesuntheit zů latein …
- Frankfurt 1556. Hermann Gülfferich. Gart der Gesundtheyt Zu Latein …

An English version of extracts from the Hortus, the Noble lyfe & natures of man, of bestes, serpentys, fowles & fisshes, was produced in 1491 by Laurence Andrew (fl. 1510–1537). A facsimile edition of this was published in London in 1954 by B. Quaritch.

== Illustrations ==
The woodcut illustrations are stylised but often easily recognizable, and many were re-used in other works. In addition to the representations of simples, pictures show their use by humans, and scenes in which figures are surrounded by the subjects in their natural environment, such as standing by a river with fish and mermaids.

== Illustrations. Mainz 1491 ==
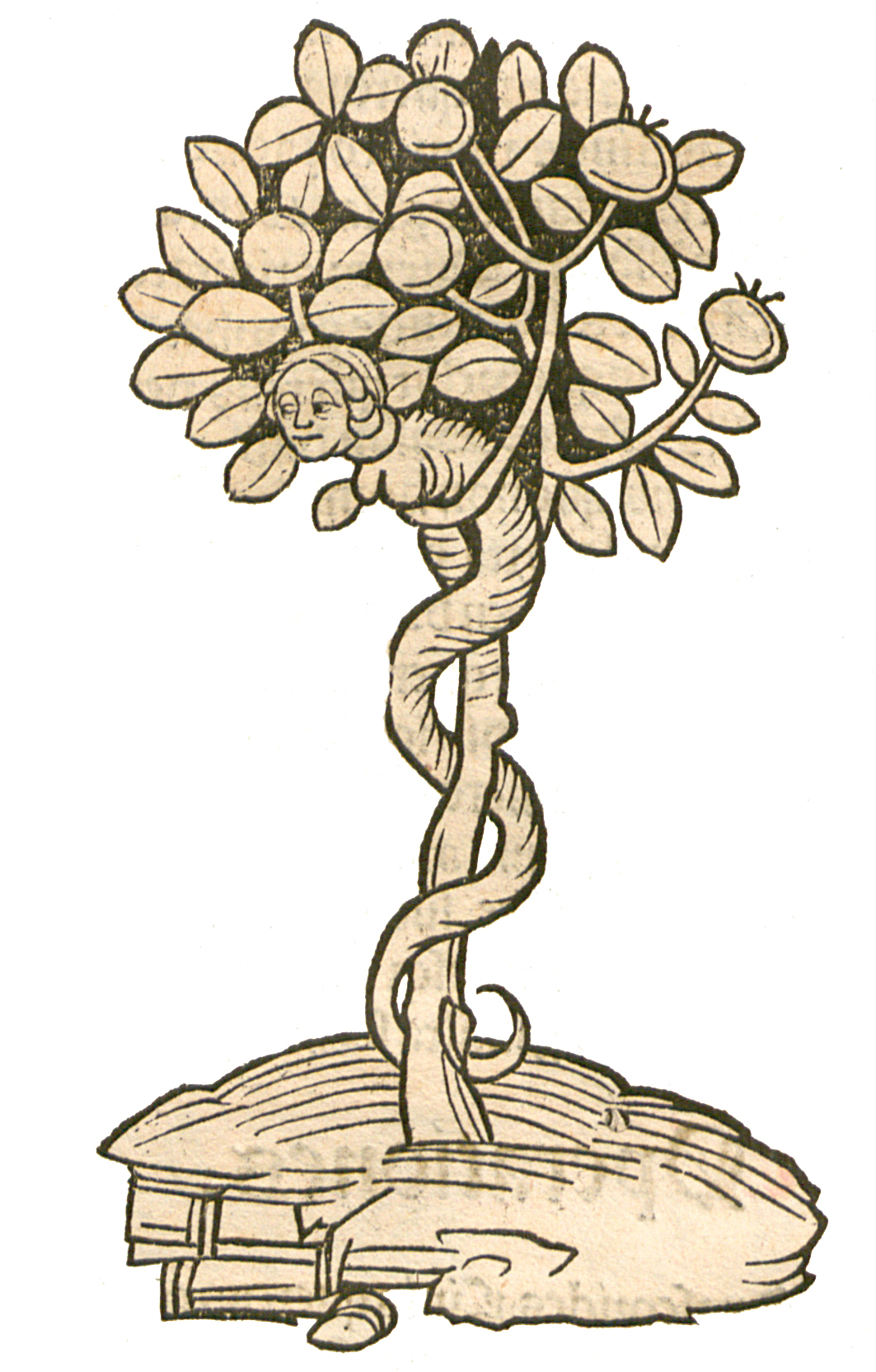
Book I, chapter 43. ..... Arbor vel lignum vite paradisi

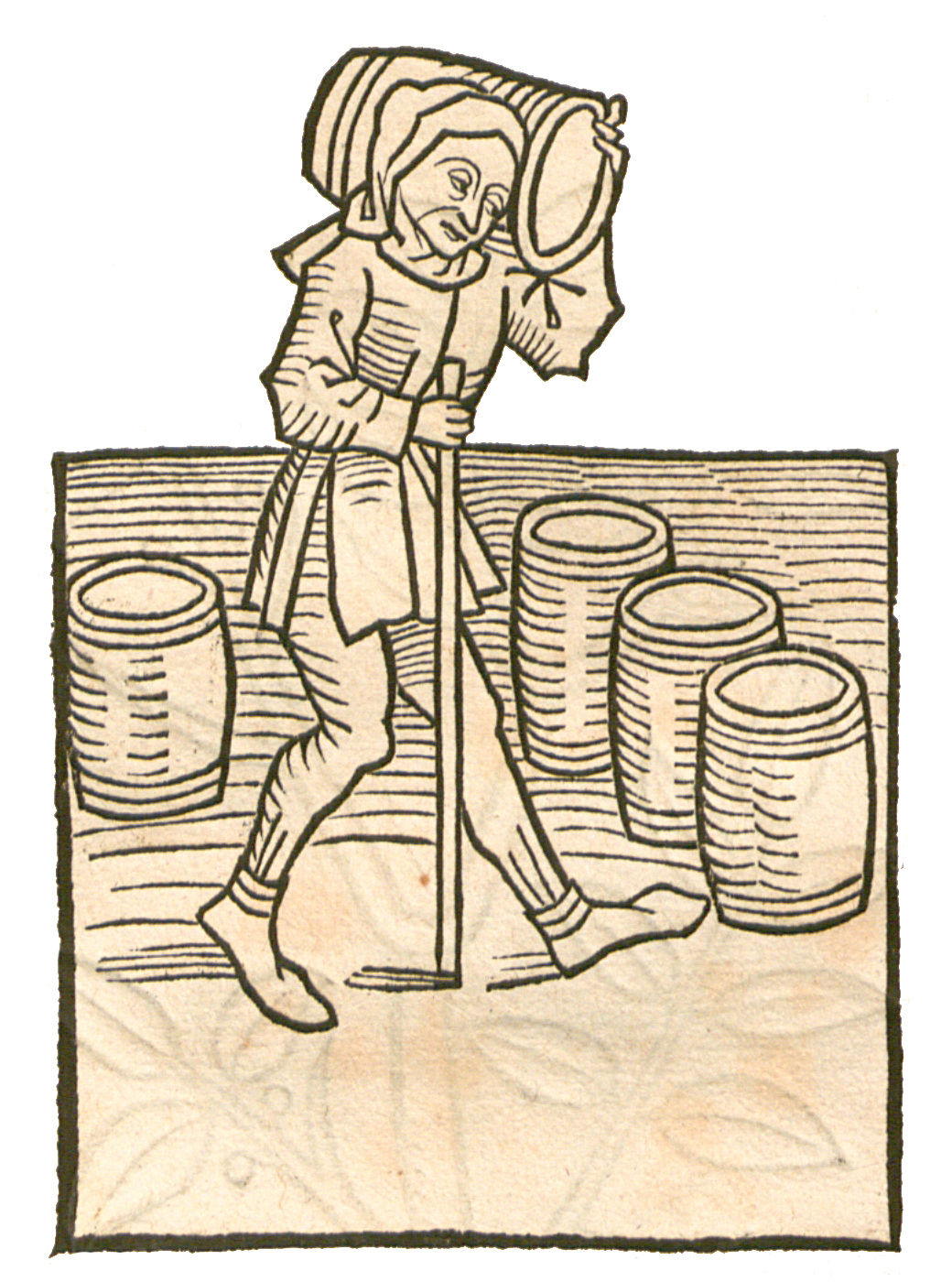
Book I, chapter 84. Butirum – Butter

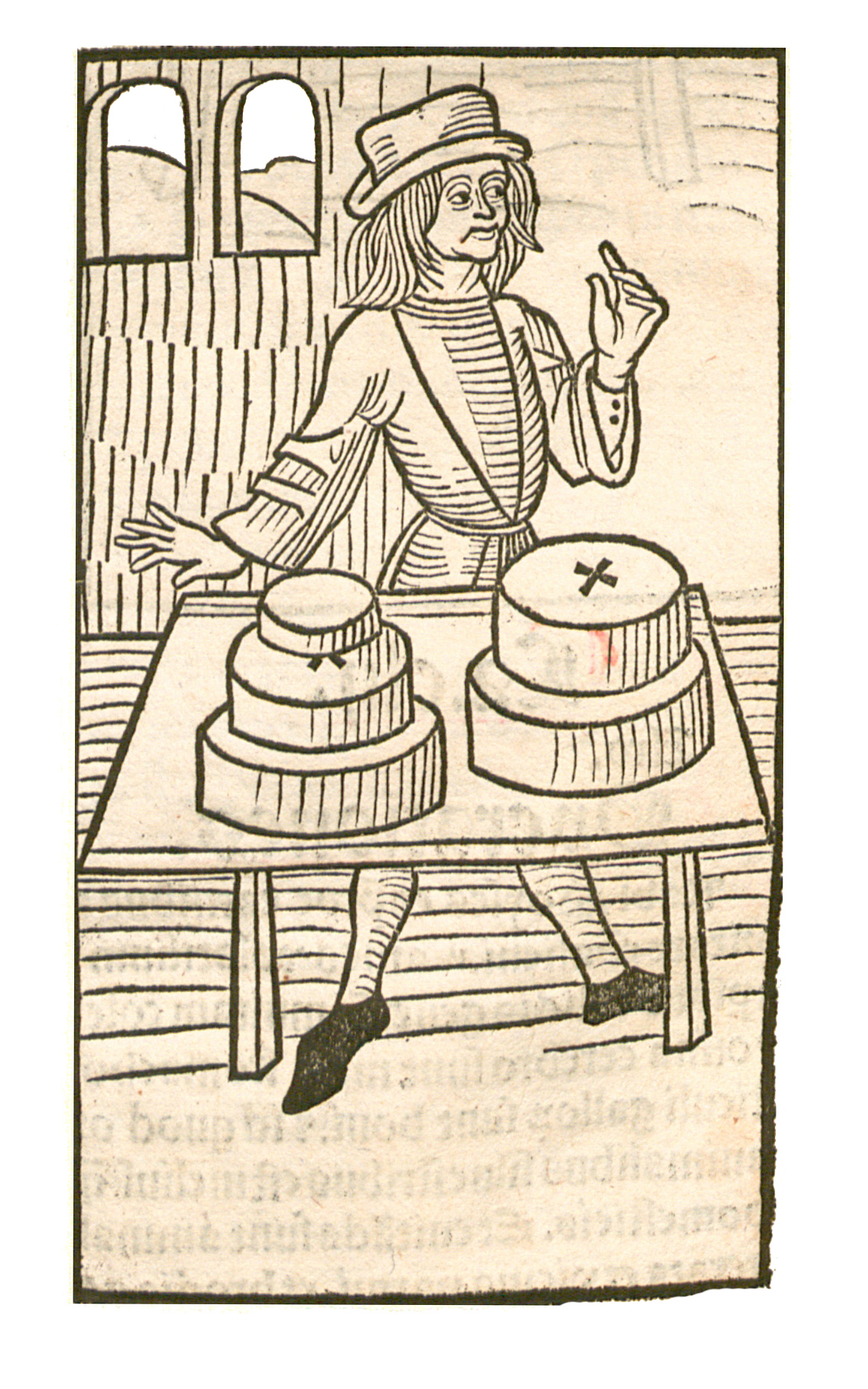
Book I, chapter 153. Caseus – Cheese

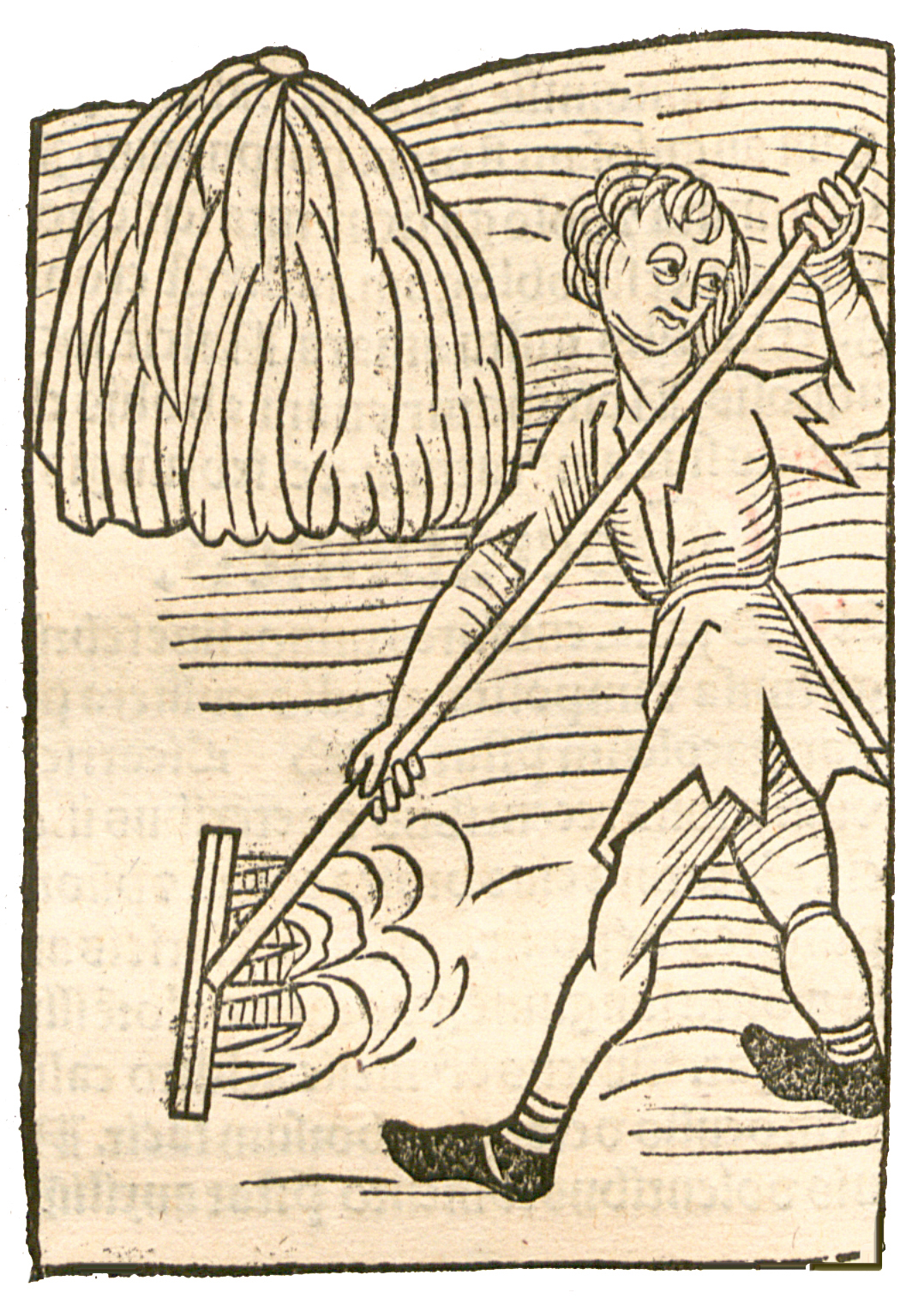
Book I, chapter 192. Fenum – Hay

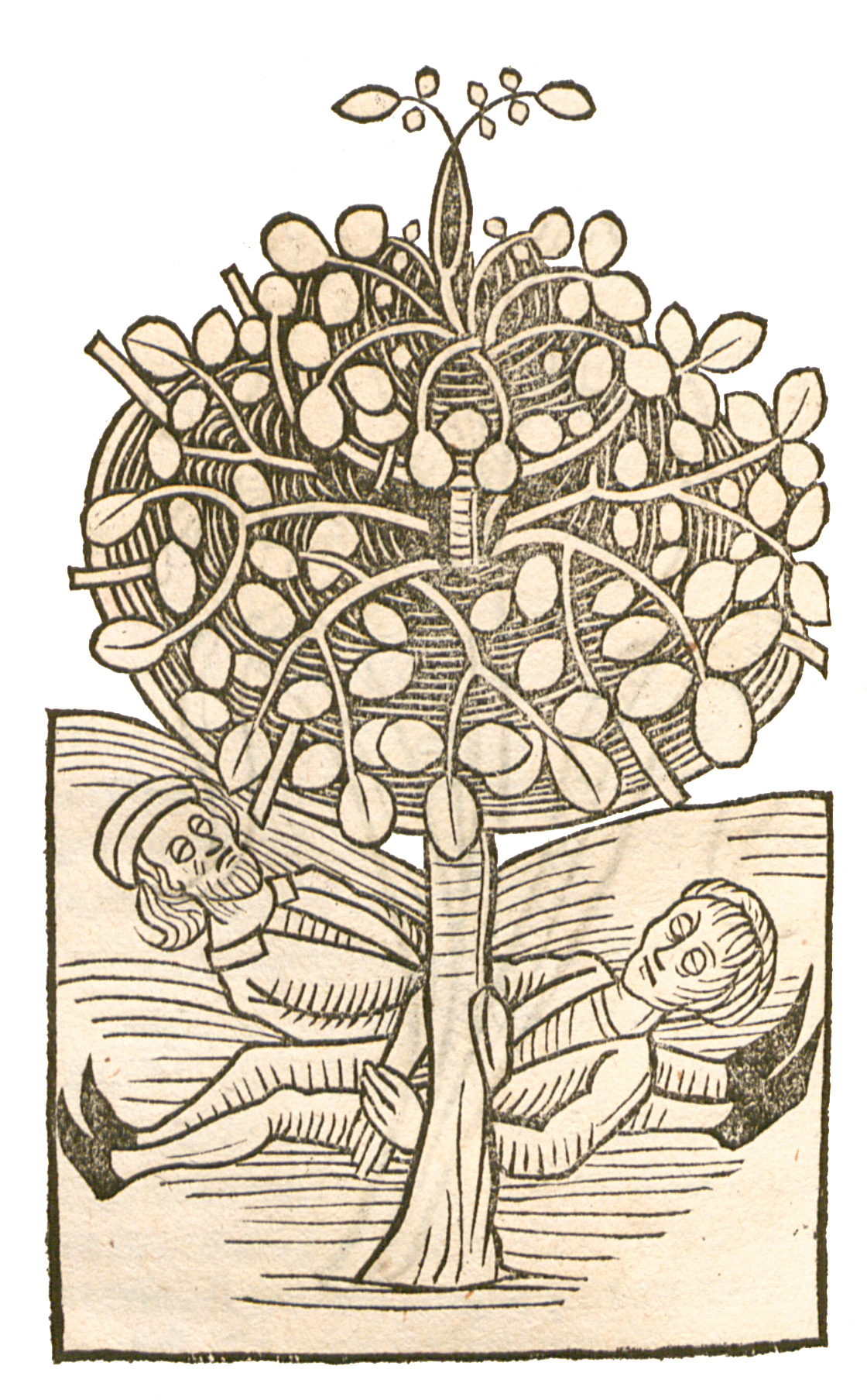
Book I, chapter 221. Hauser vel hausor

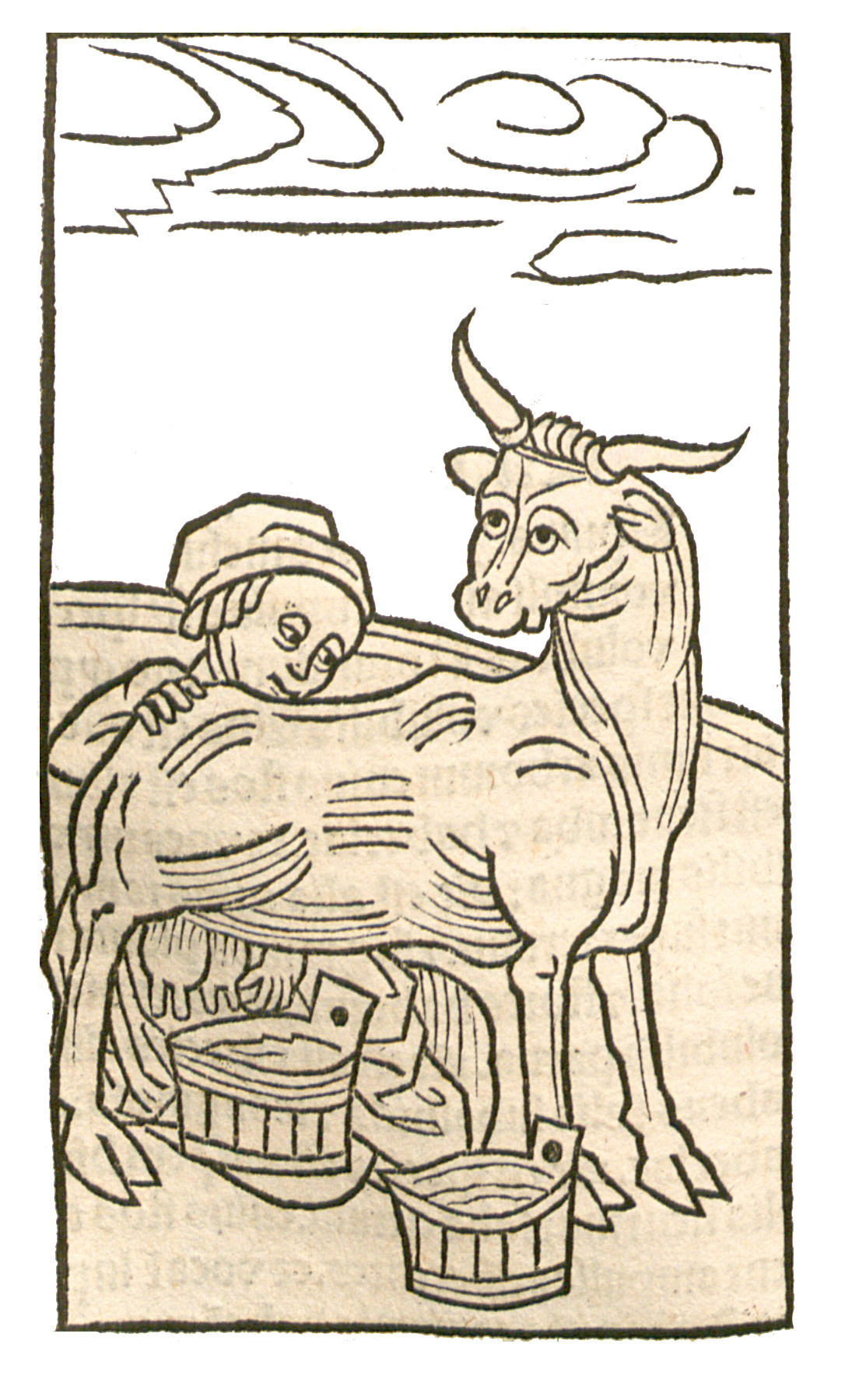
Book I, chapter 269. ..... Lac – Milk

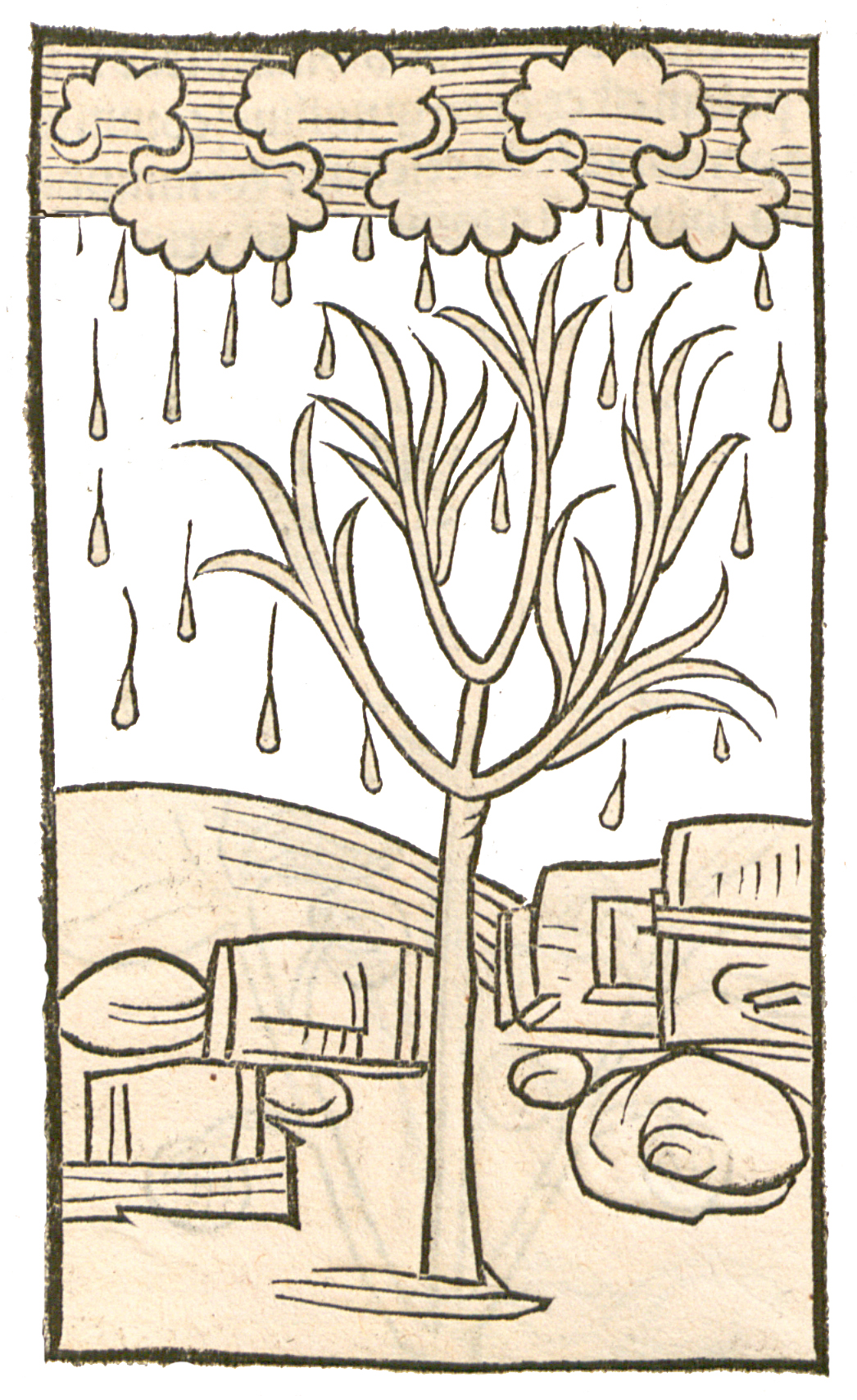
Book I, chapter 275. Manna

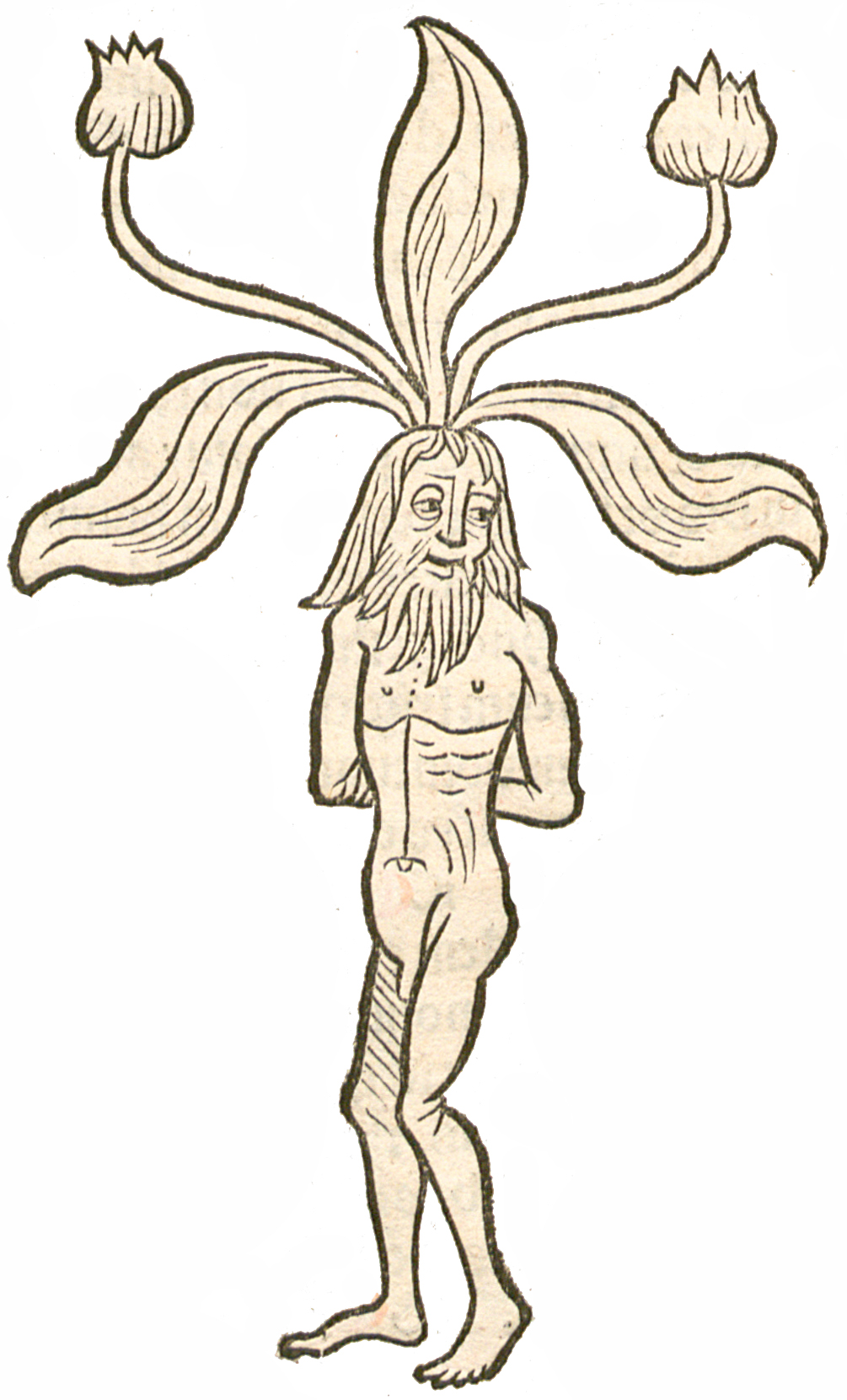
Book Buch I, chapter 276. Mandragora vir

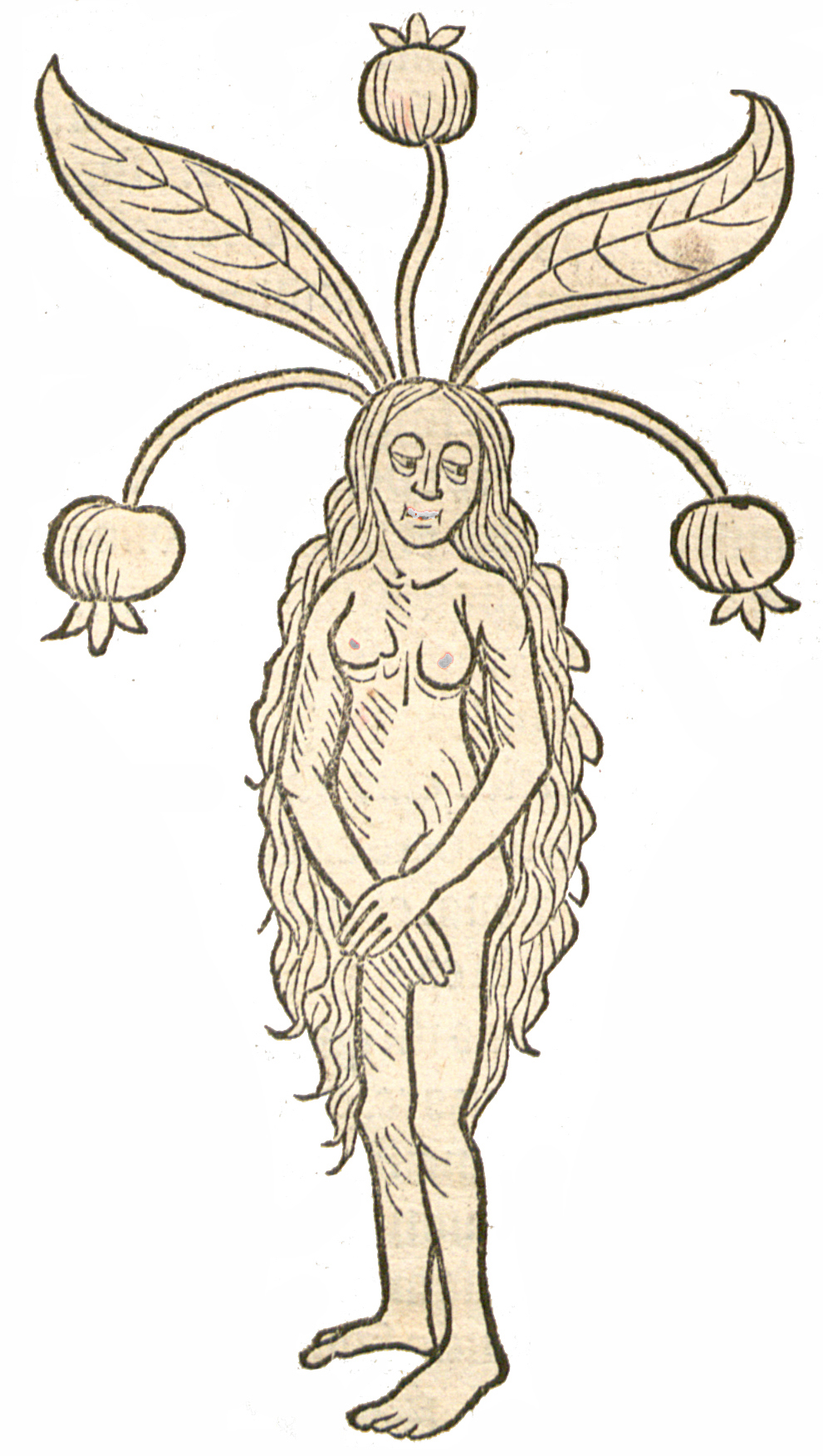
Book I, chapter 277. Mandragora femine

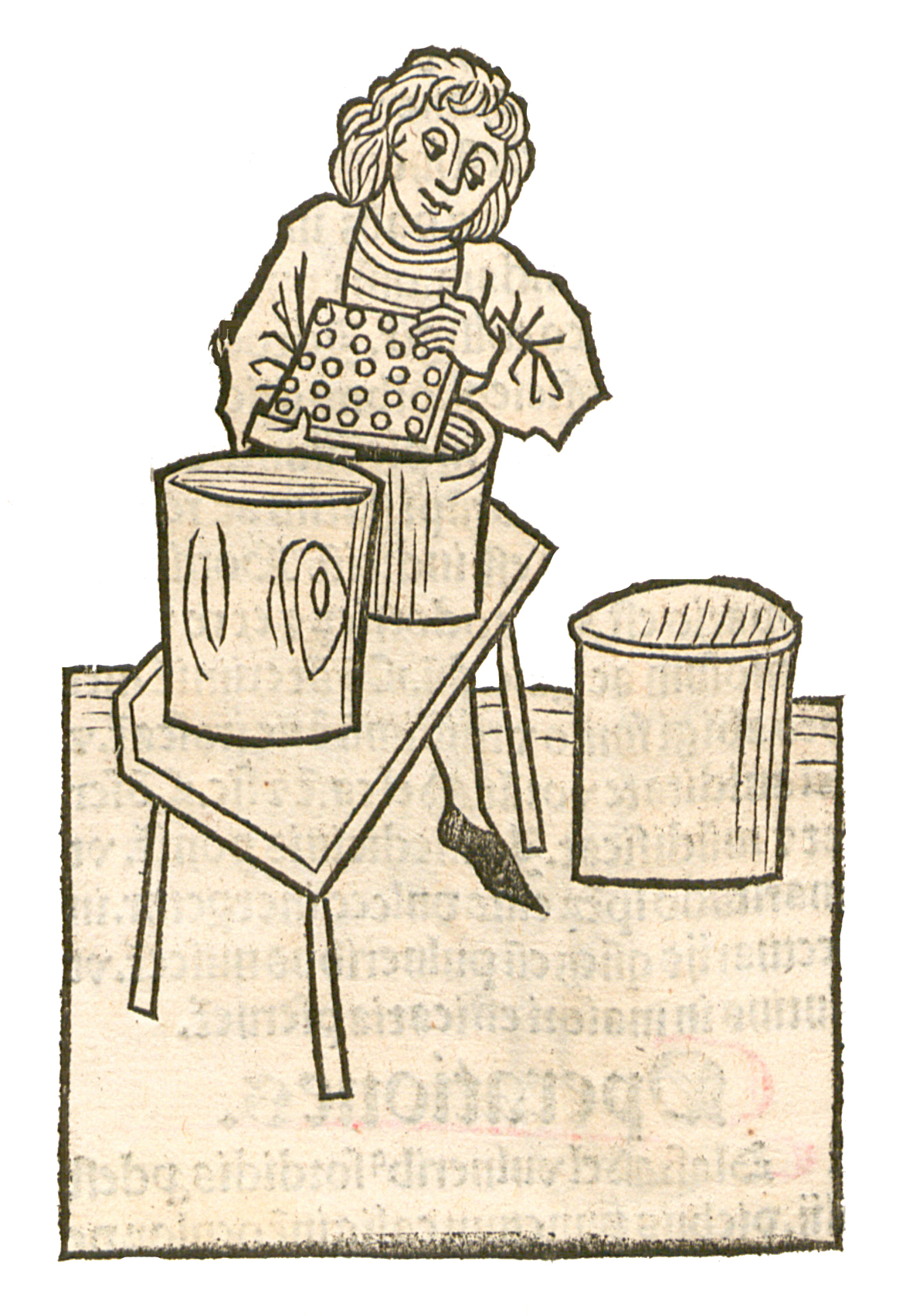
Book I, chapter 292. ..... Mel – Honey

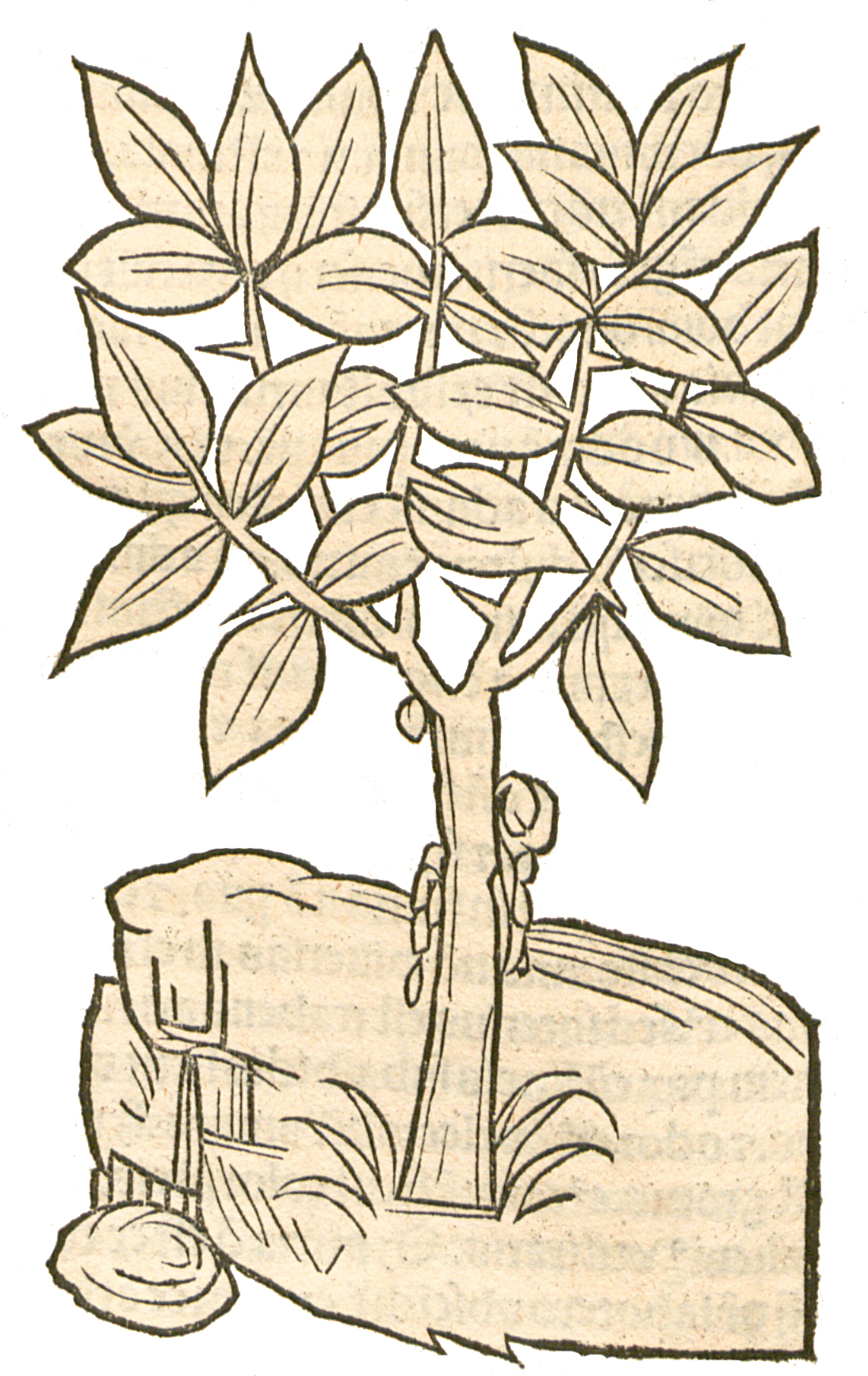
Book I, chapter 298. ..... Mirra

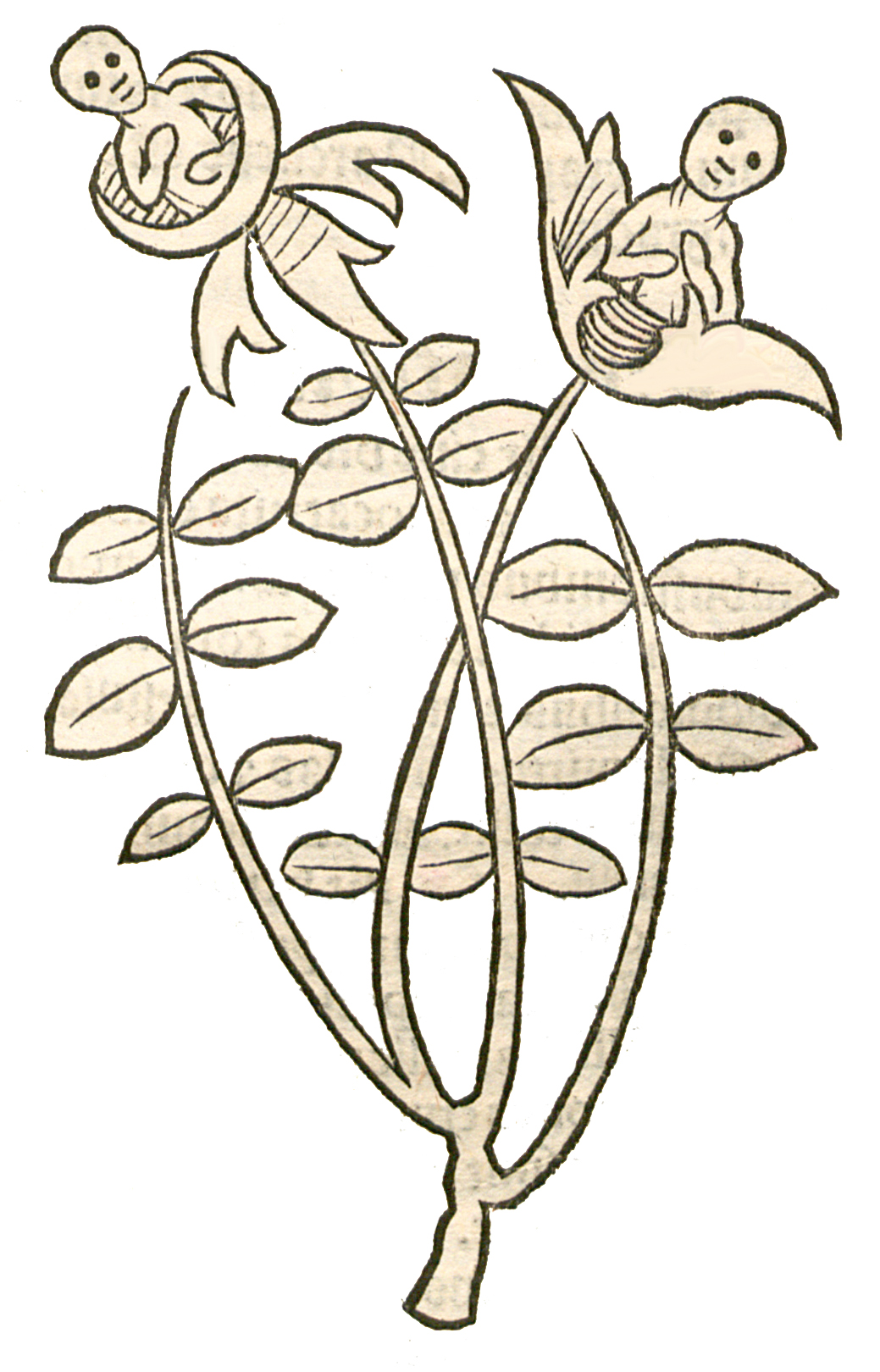
Book I, chapter 307. Narcissus

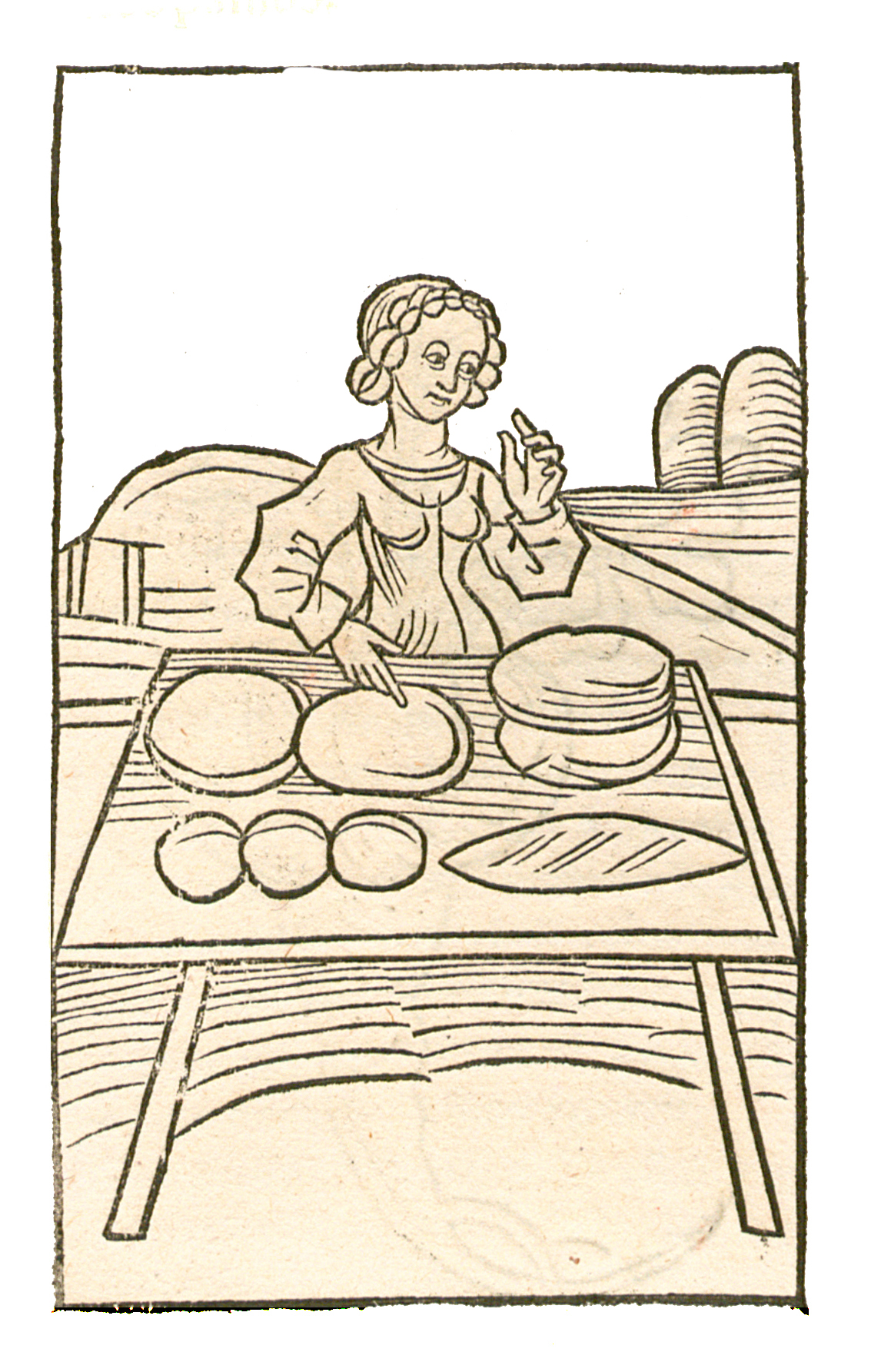
Book I, chapter 382. Panis – Bread

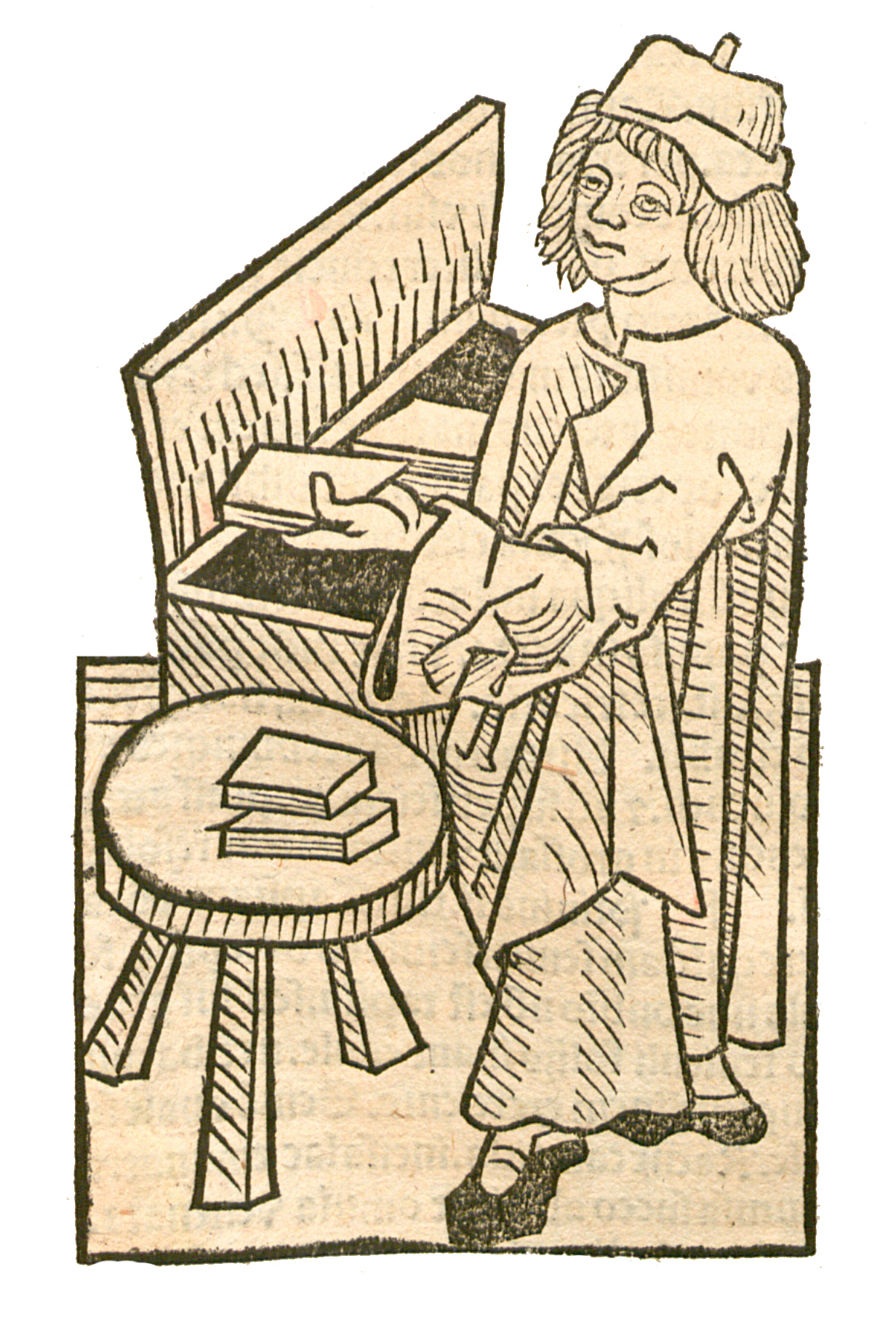
Book I, chapter 463. ..... Sapo – Soap

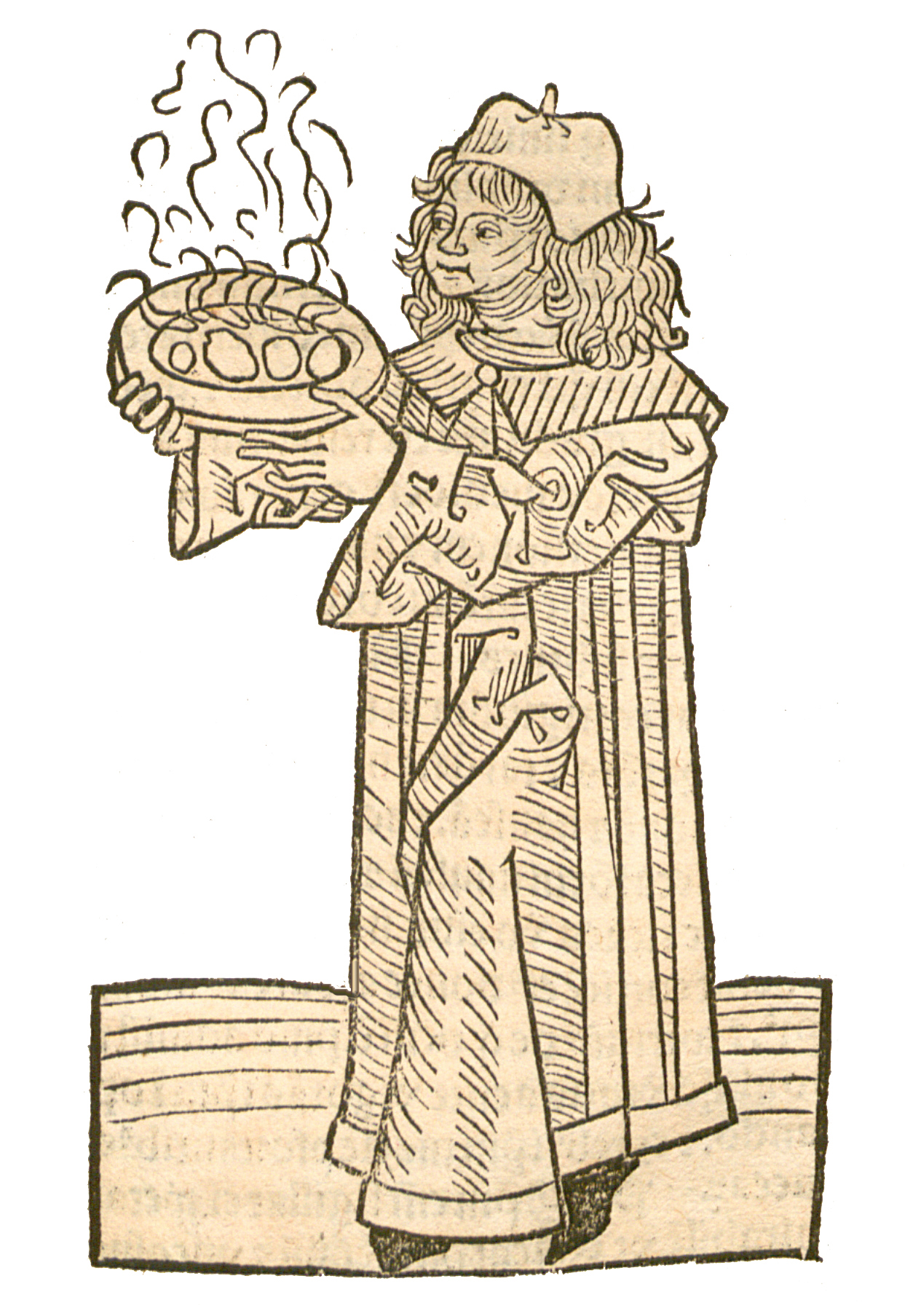
Book I, chapter 484. ..... Thus – Frankincense

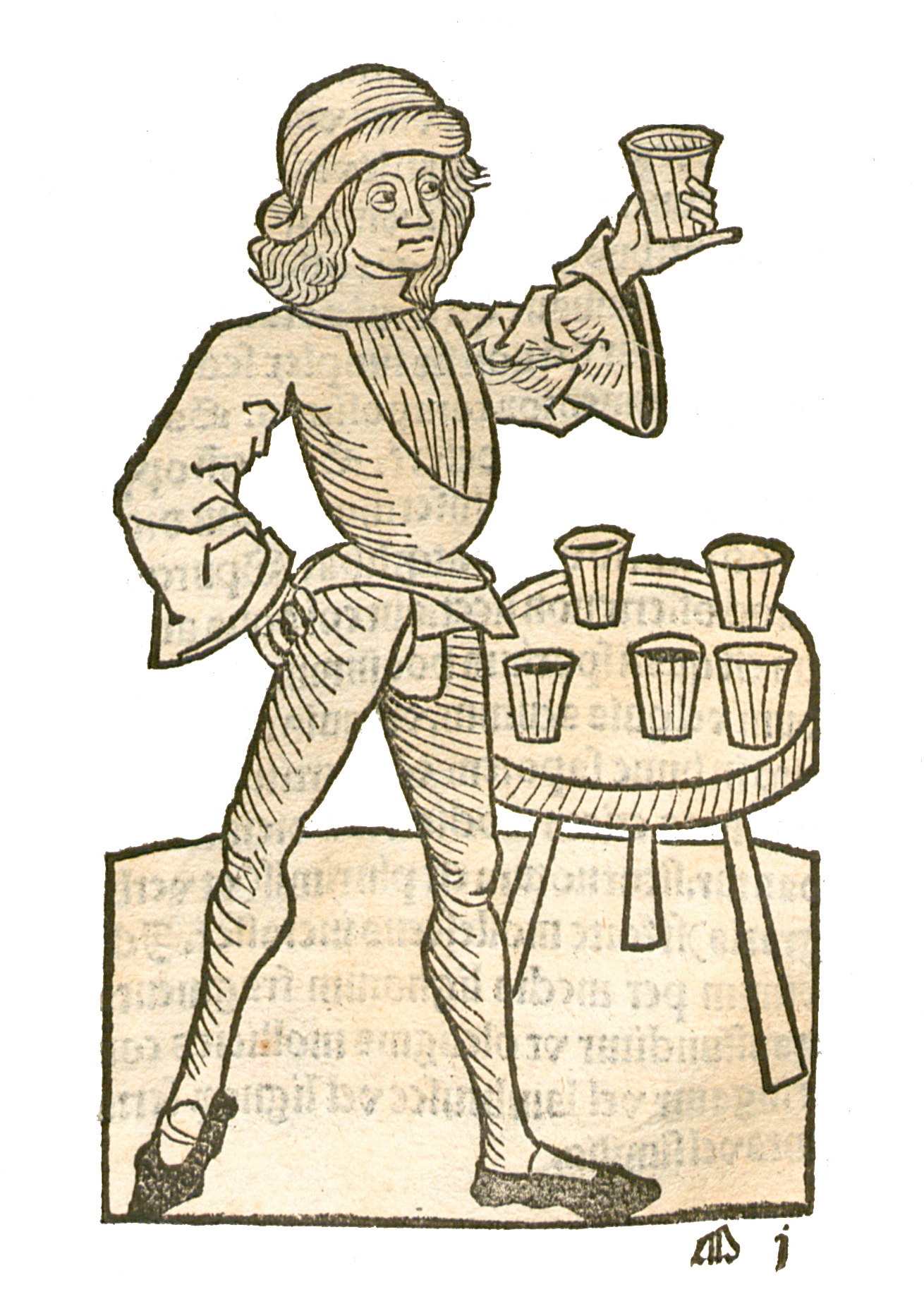
Book I, chapter 510. Vinum – Vine

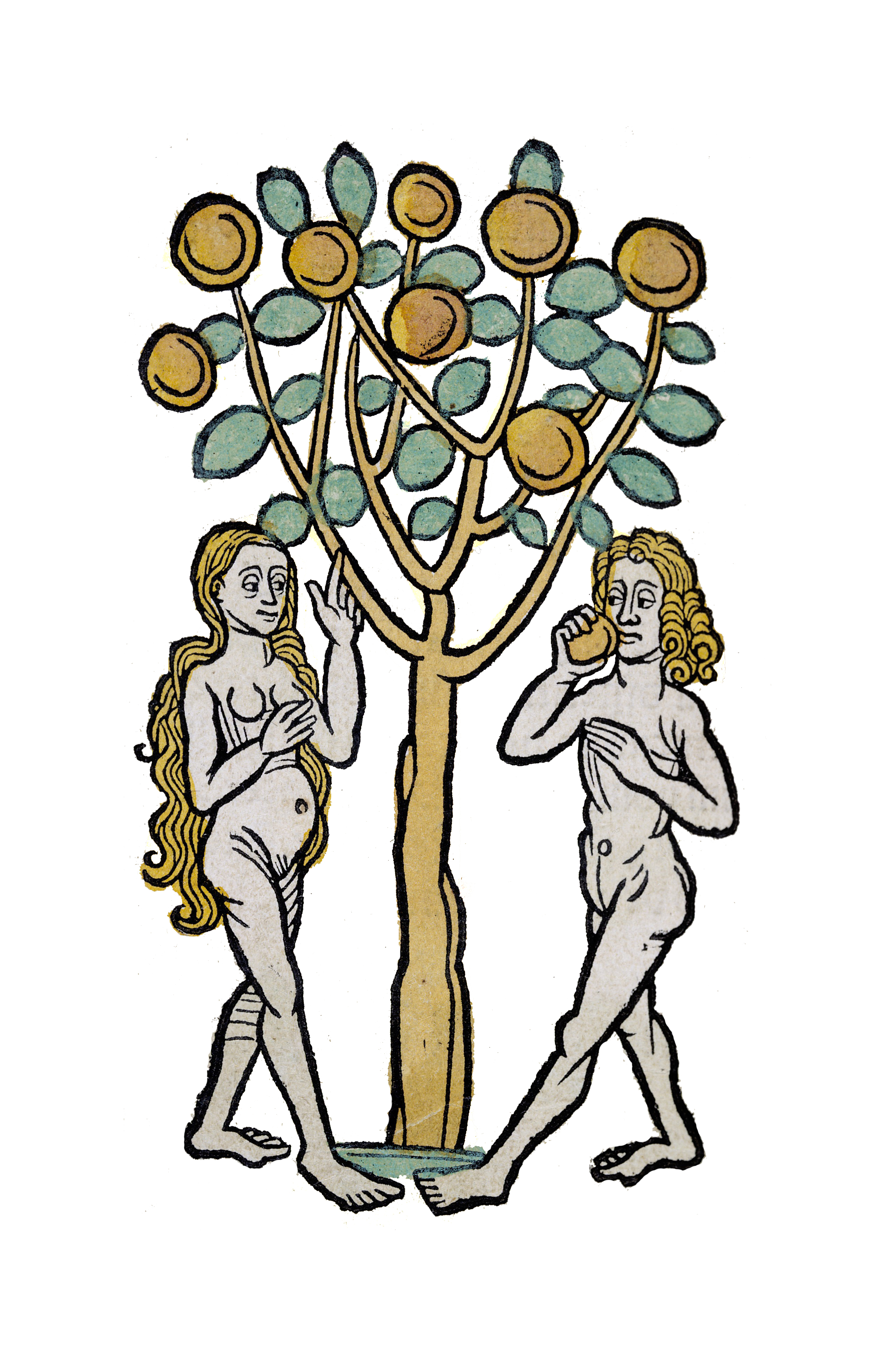
Book I, chapter 529. Adam and Eve under the Arbor paradisi

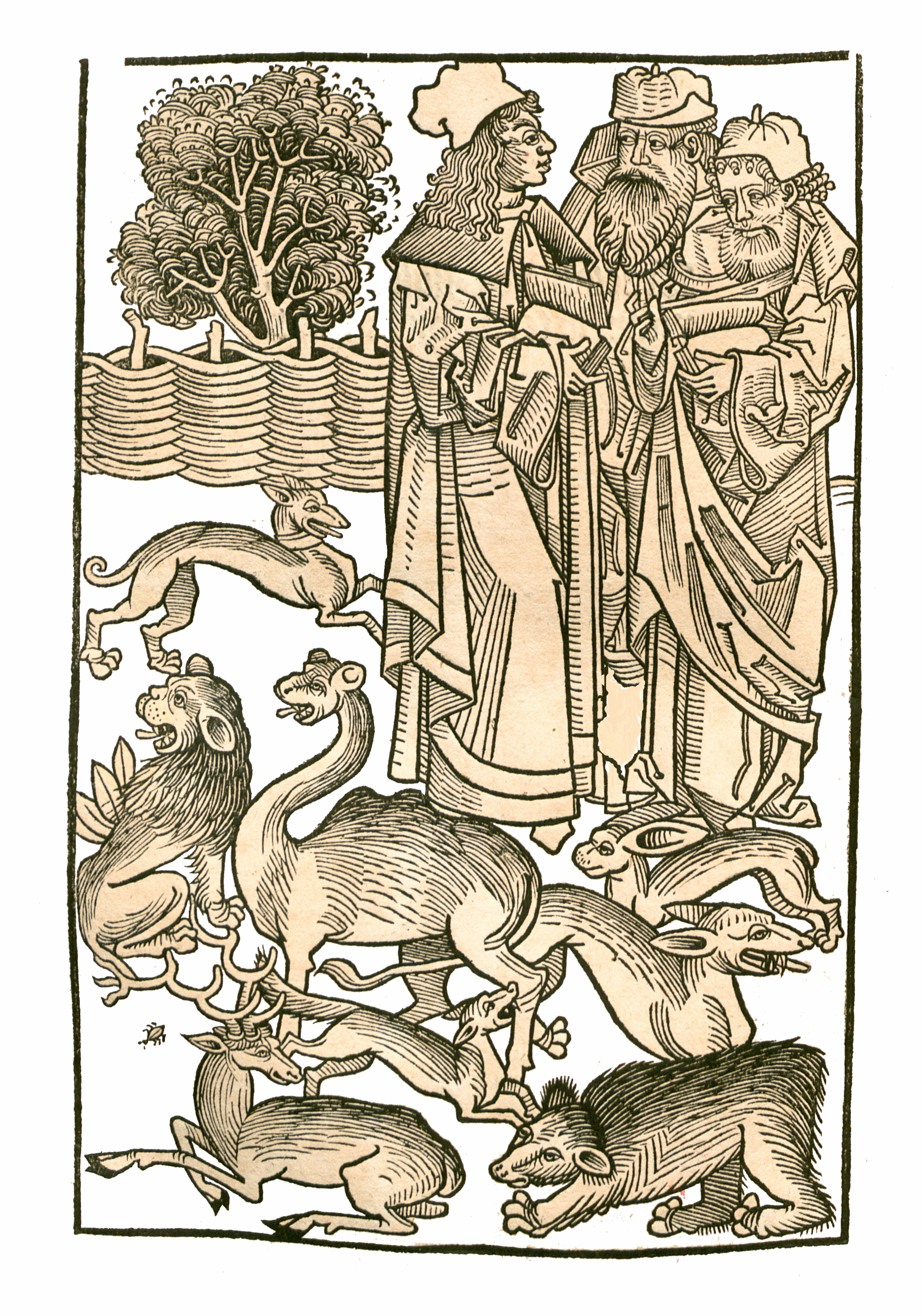
Titlepage of the chapter ... »De animalibus«

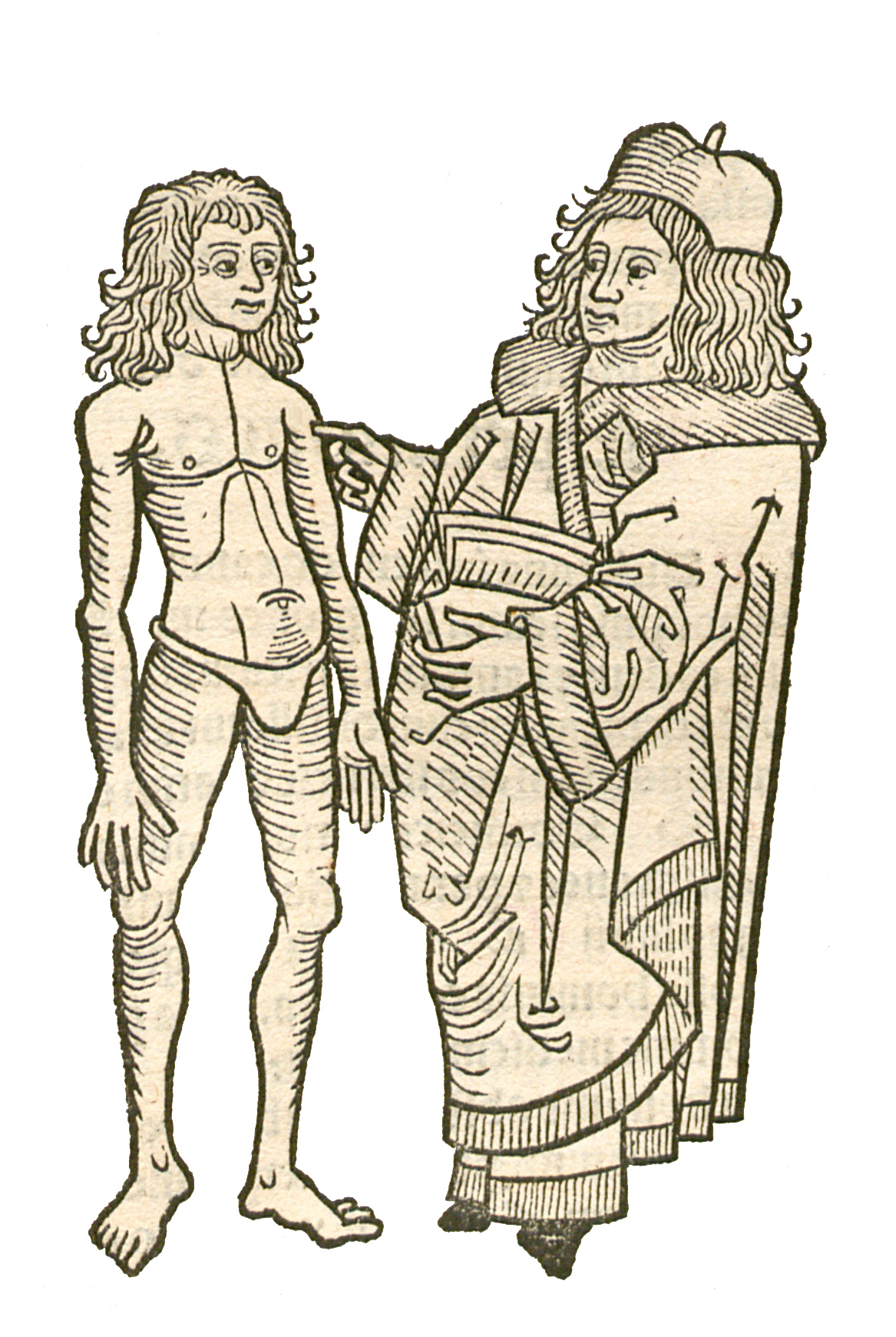
Book II, chapter 1. ..... Homo – Human

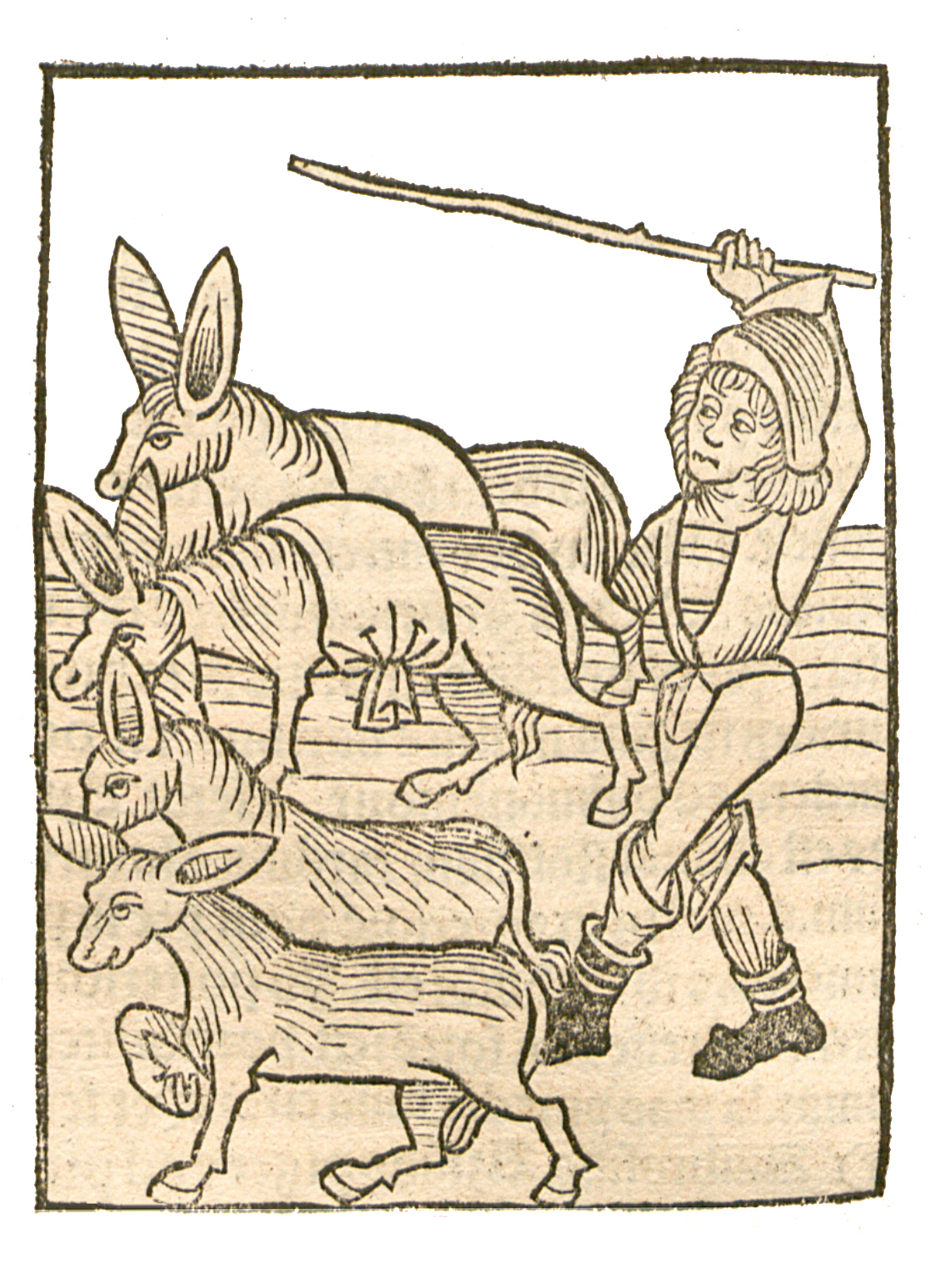
Book II, chapter 5. ..... Asinus – Donkey

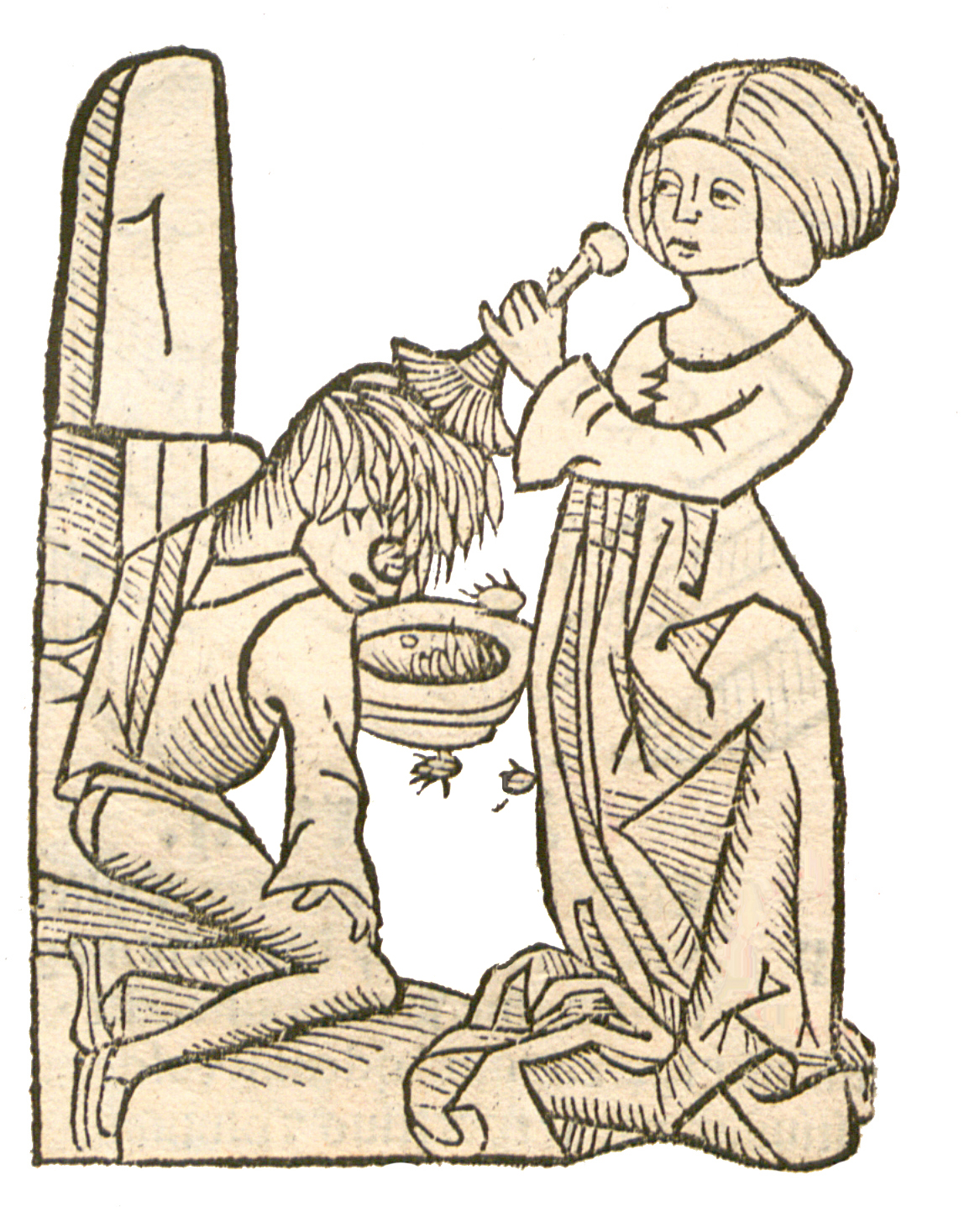
Book II, chapter 119. Pediculus – Head louse

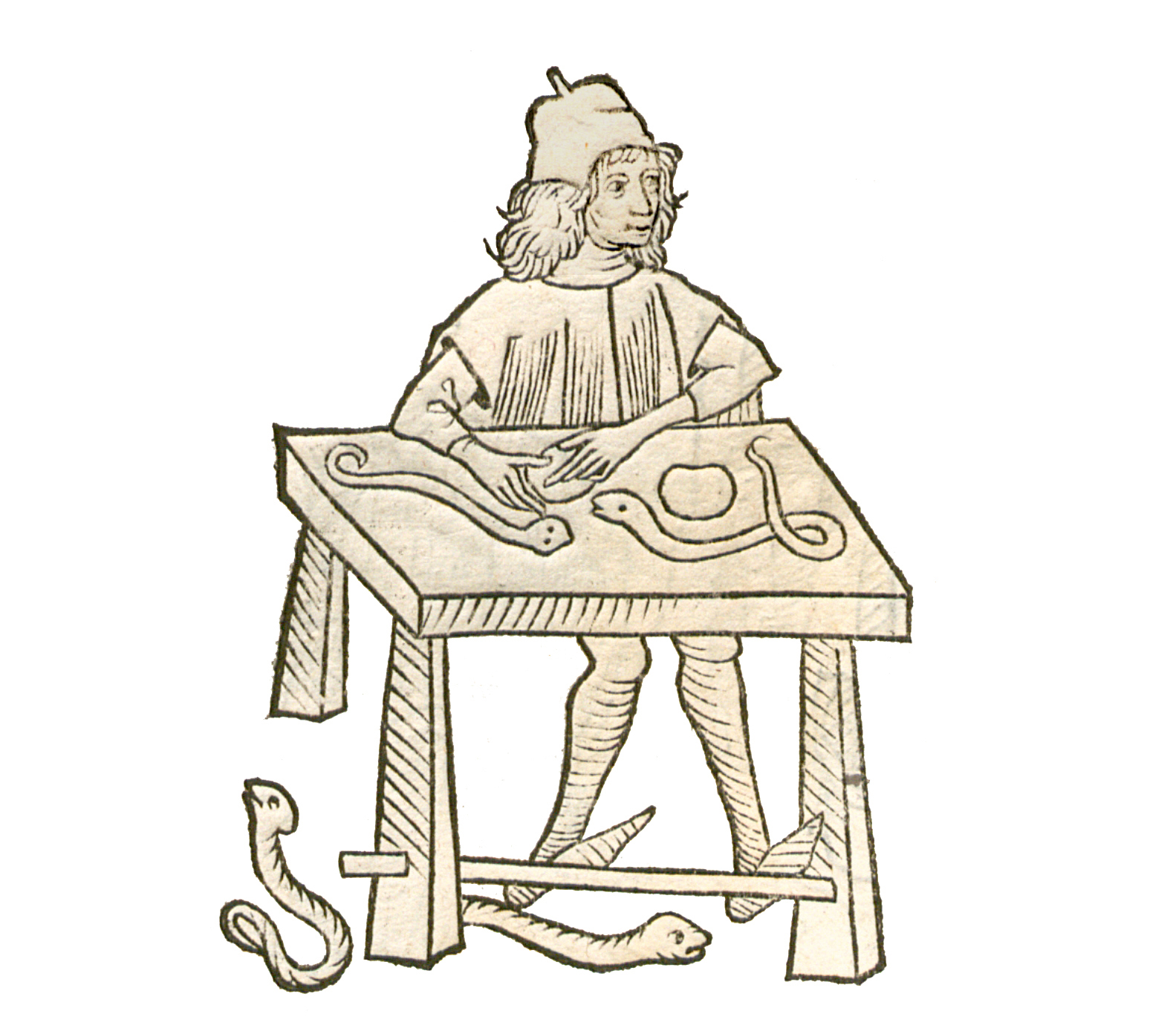
Book II, chapter 154. Vipera

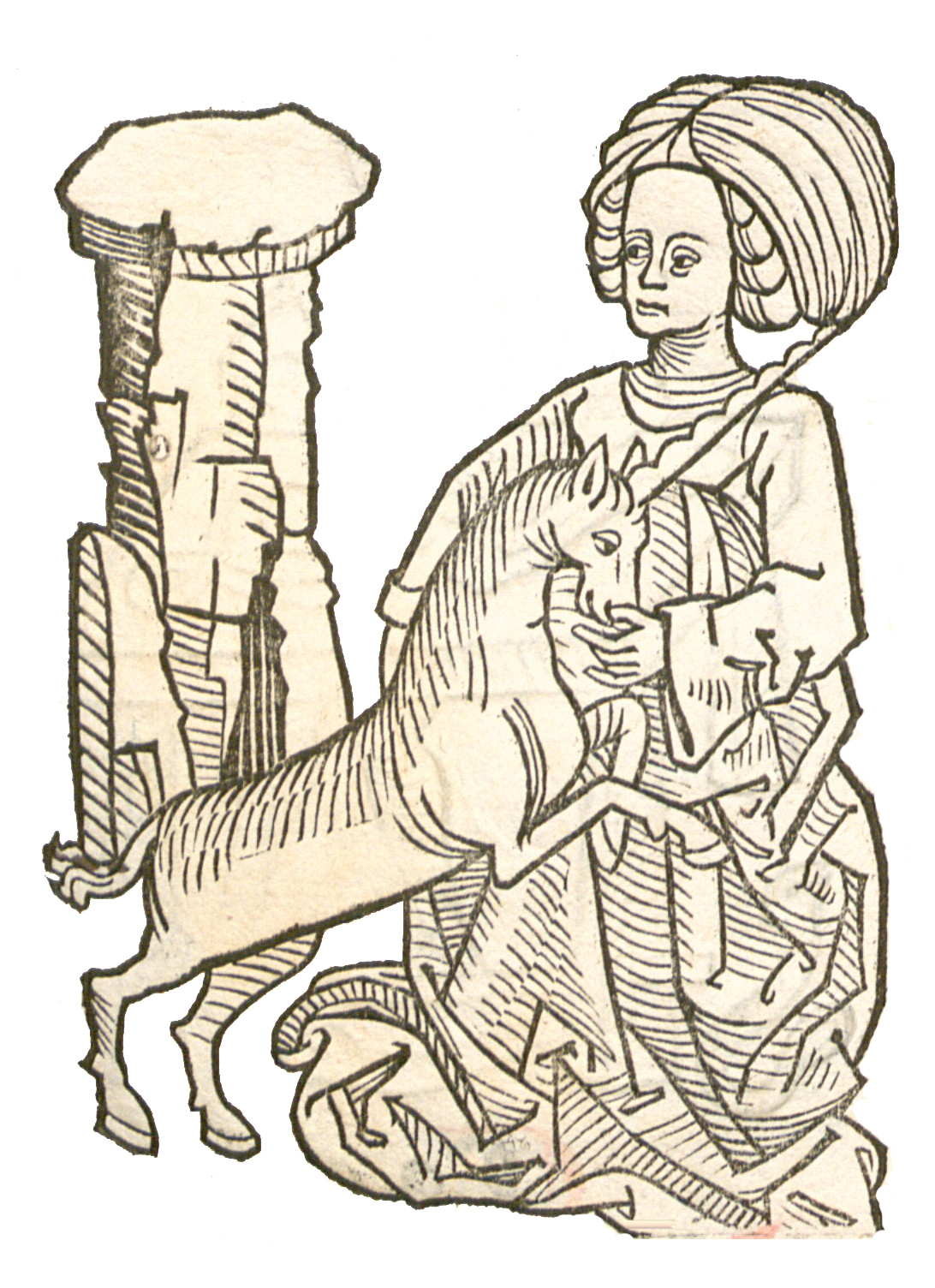
Book II, chapter 155. Unicornus – Unicorn

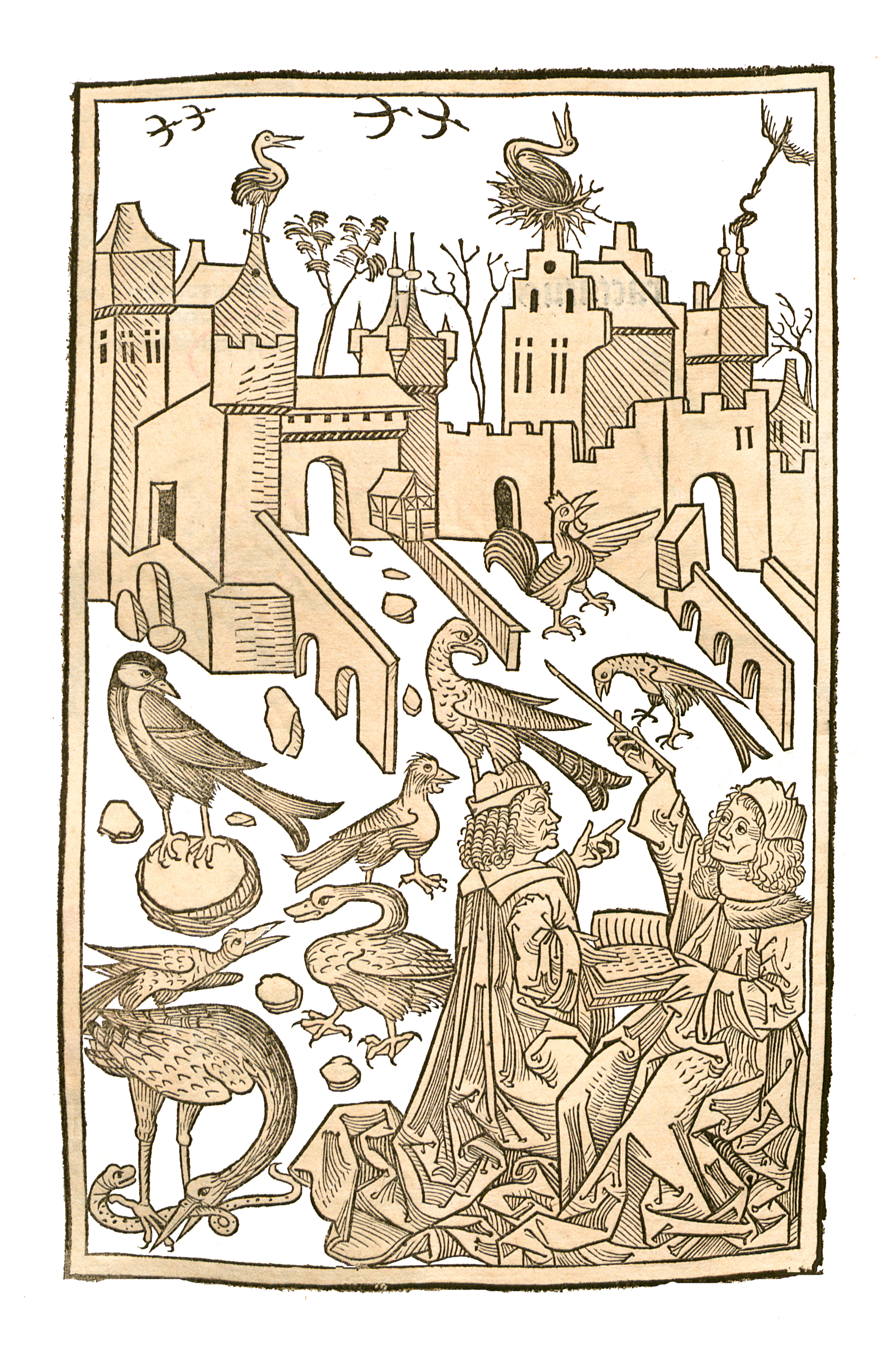
Titlepage of the chapter ... »De avibus«

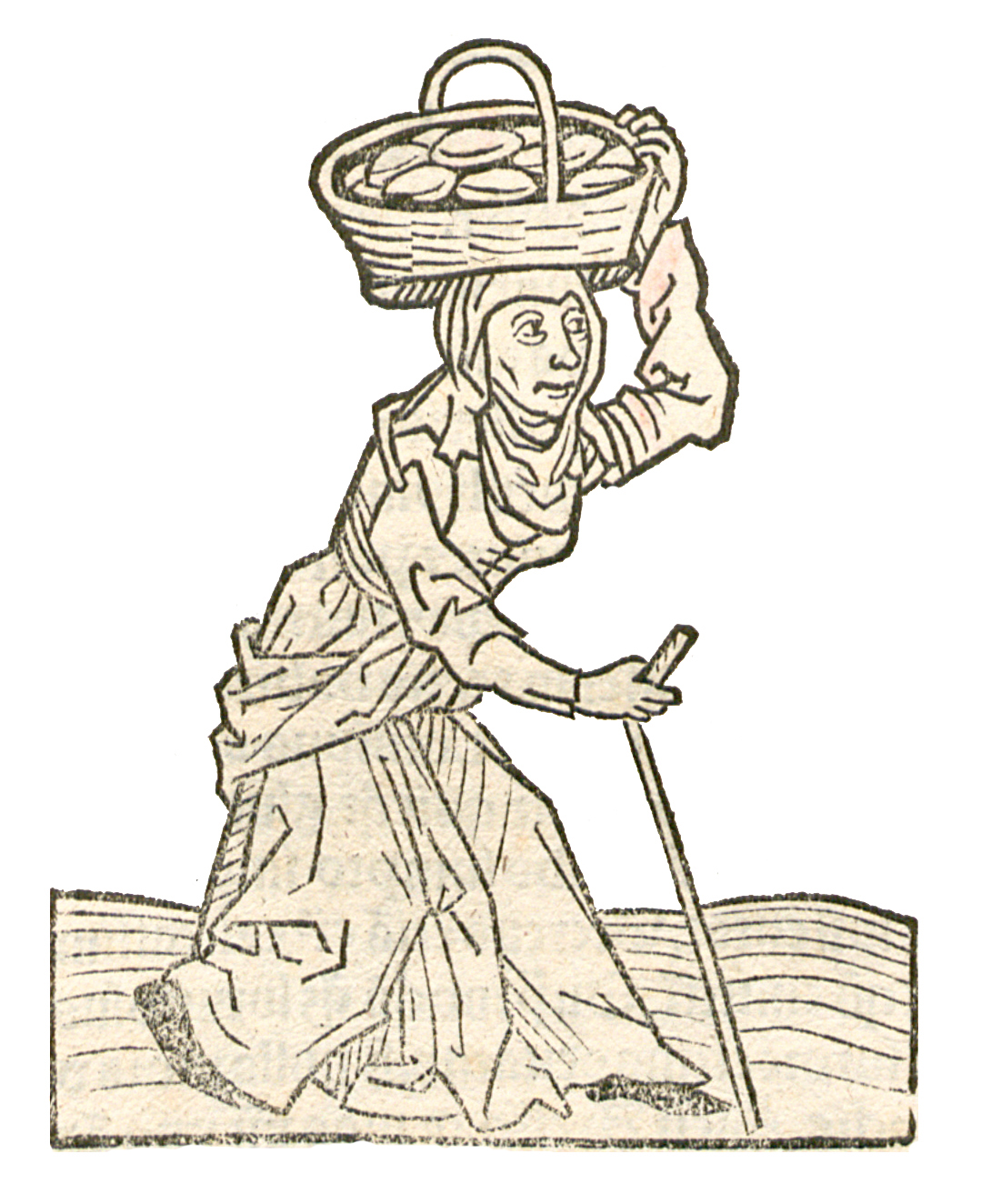
Book III, chapter 91. ..... Ova – Eggs

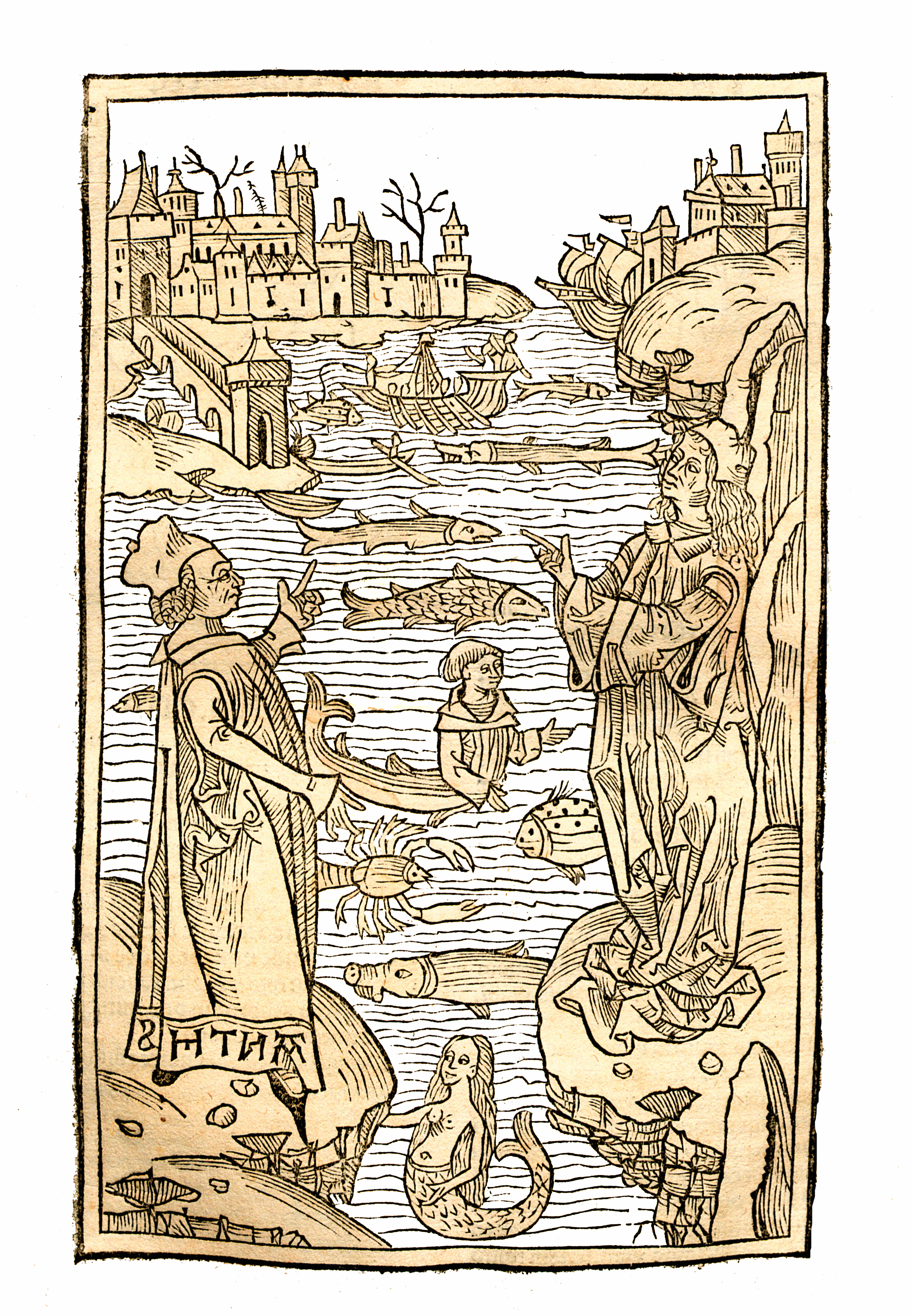
Titlepage of the chapter ... »De piscibus«

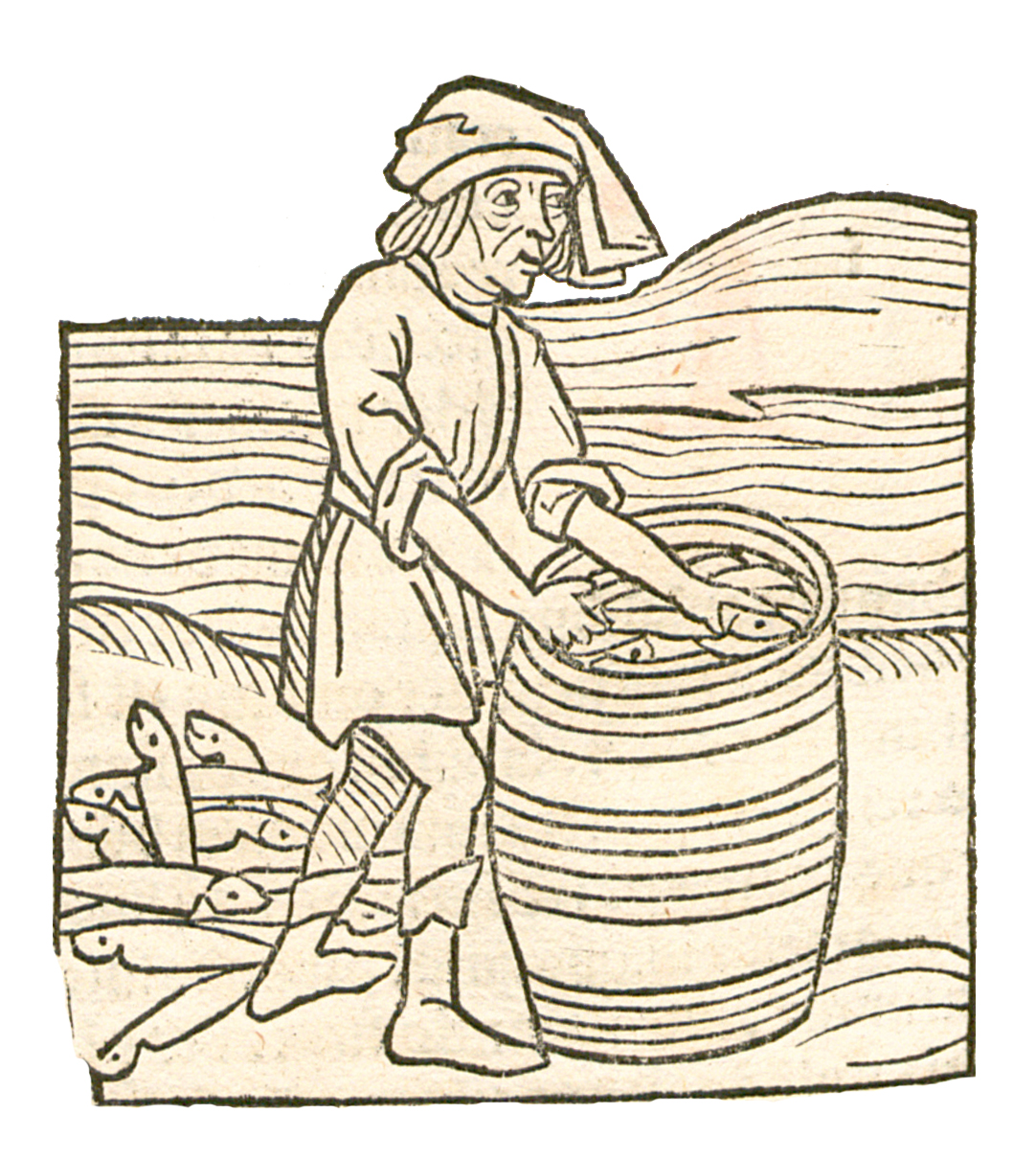
Book IV, chapter 3. ..... Allec – Fish soup

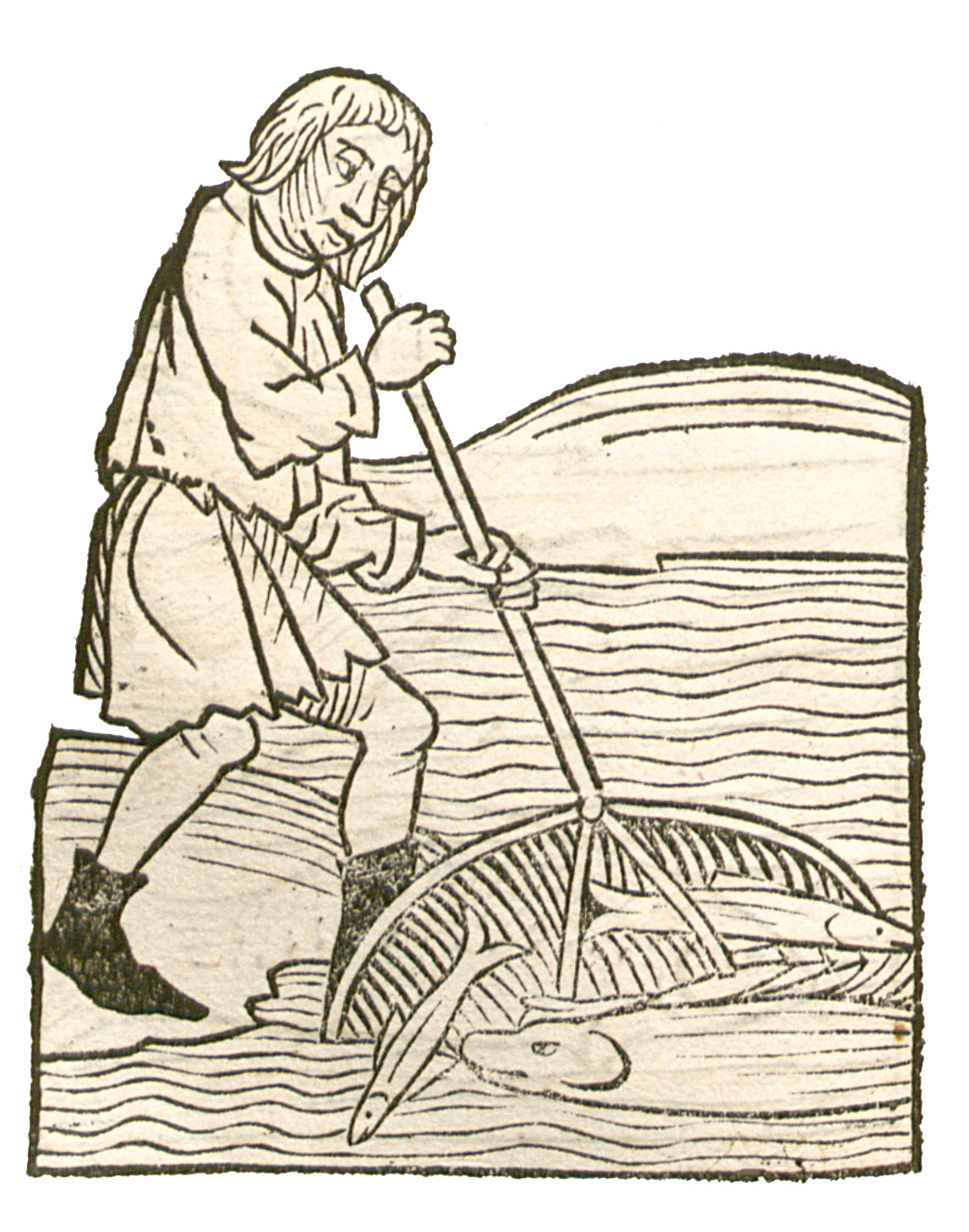
Book IV, chapter 56. ..... Mugil – Mullet

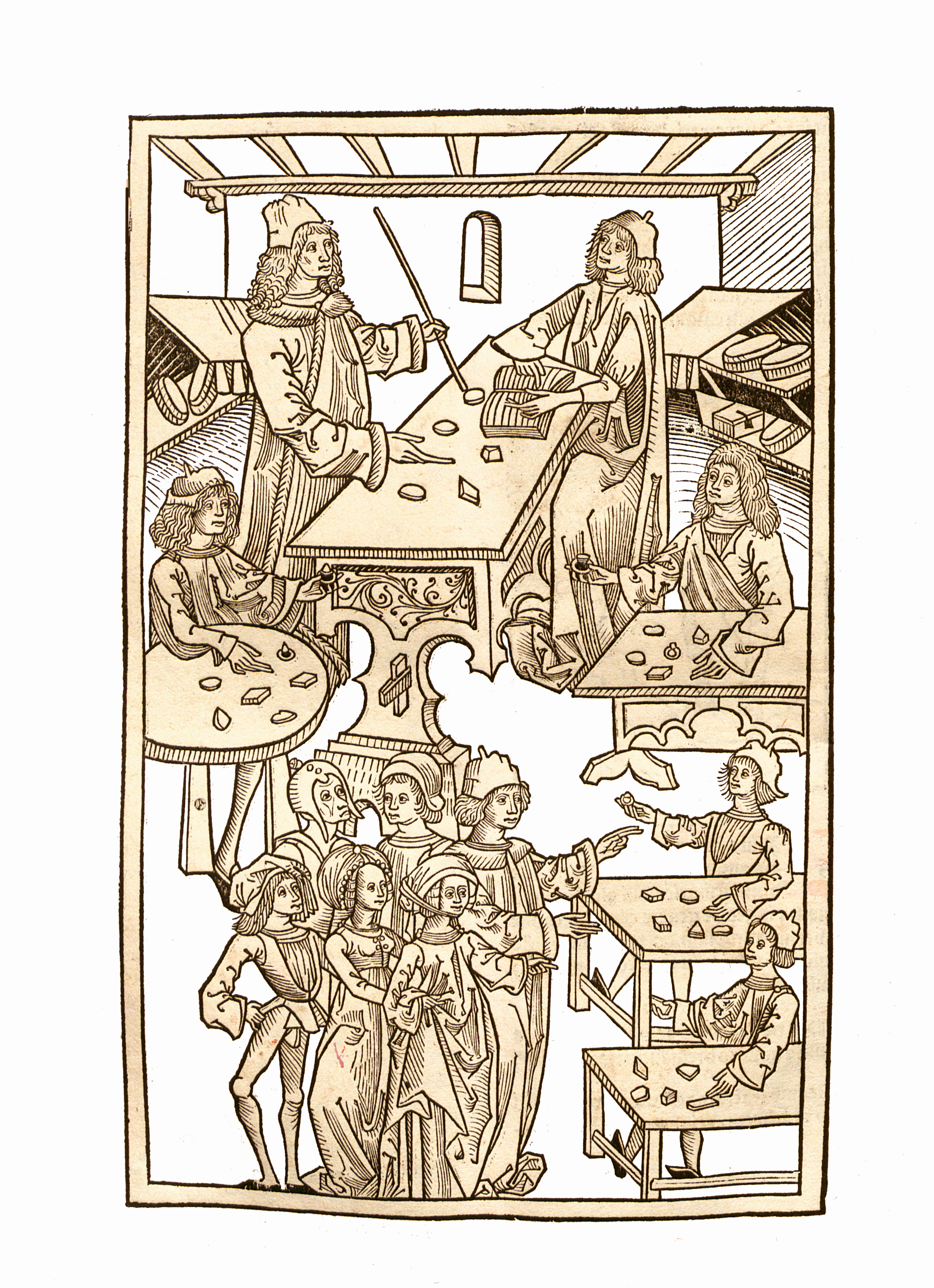
Titlepage of the chapter ... »De lapidibus«

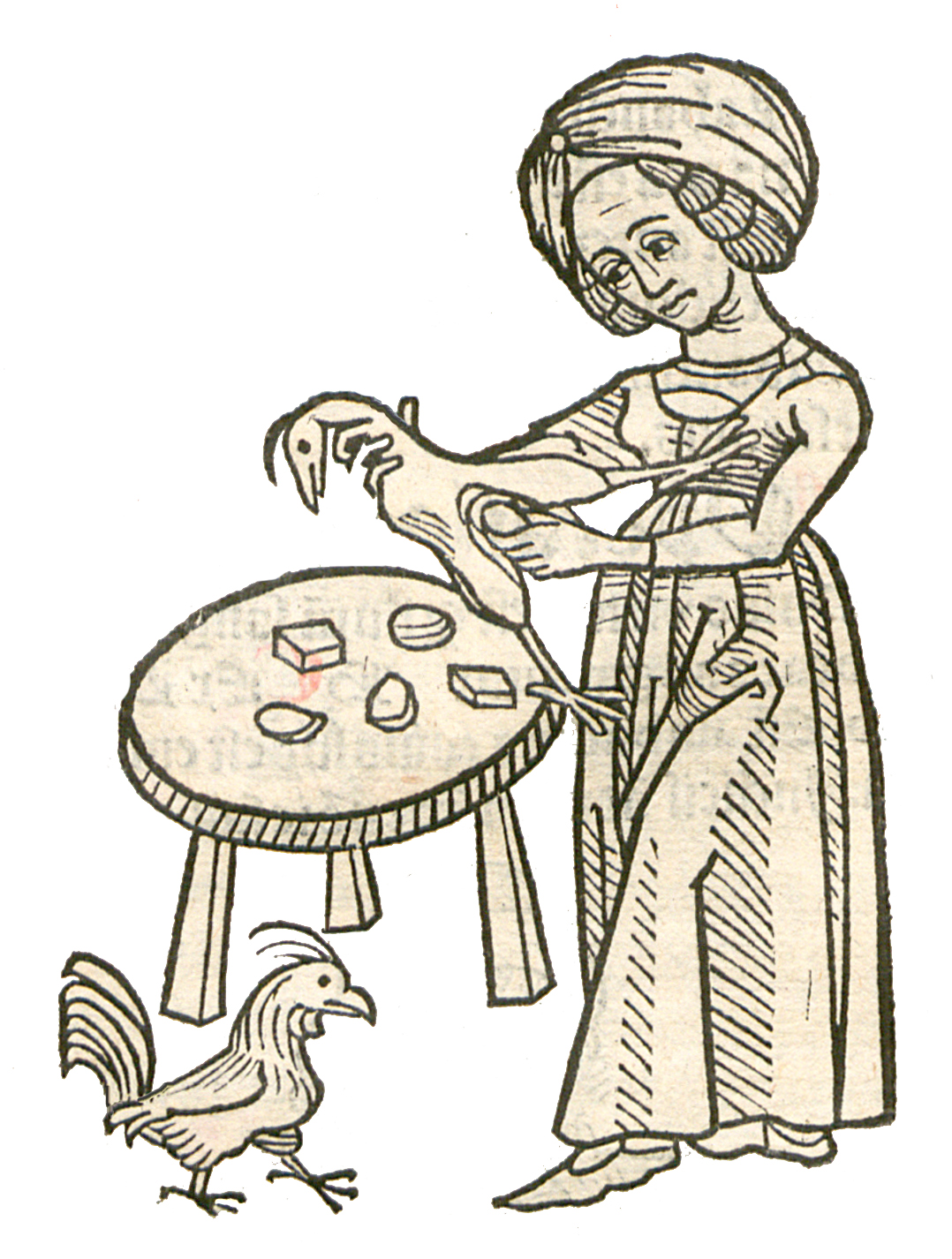
Book V, chapter 6. Allectorius – Stone in the liver of a Capon

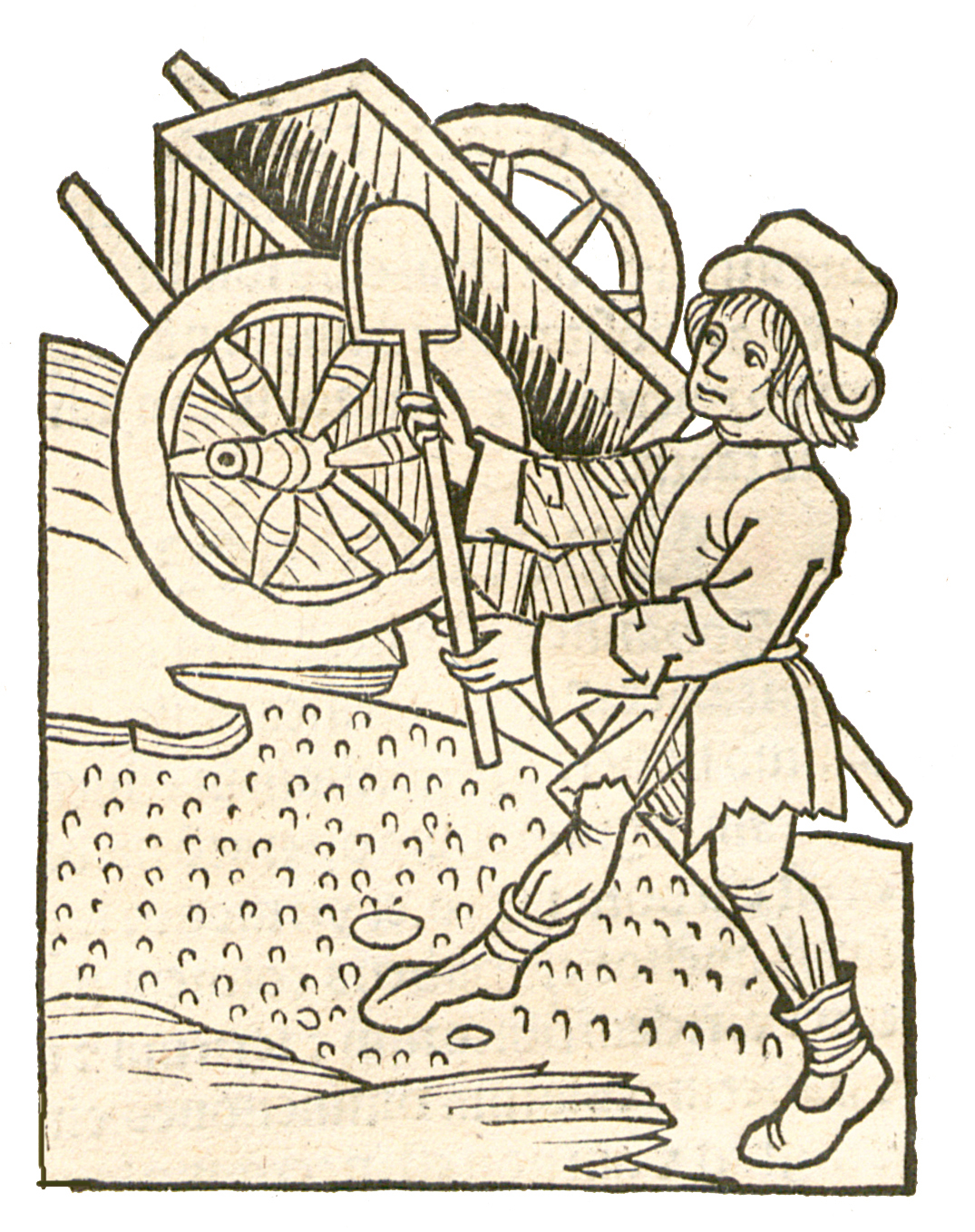
Book V, chapter 12. Arena – Sand

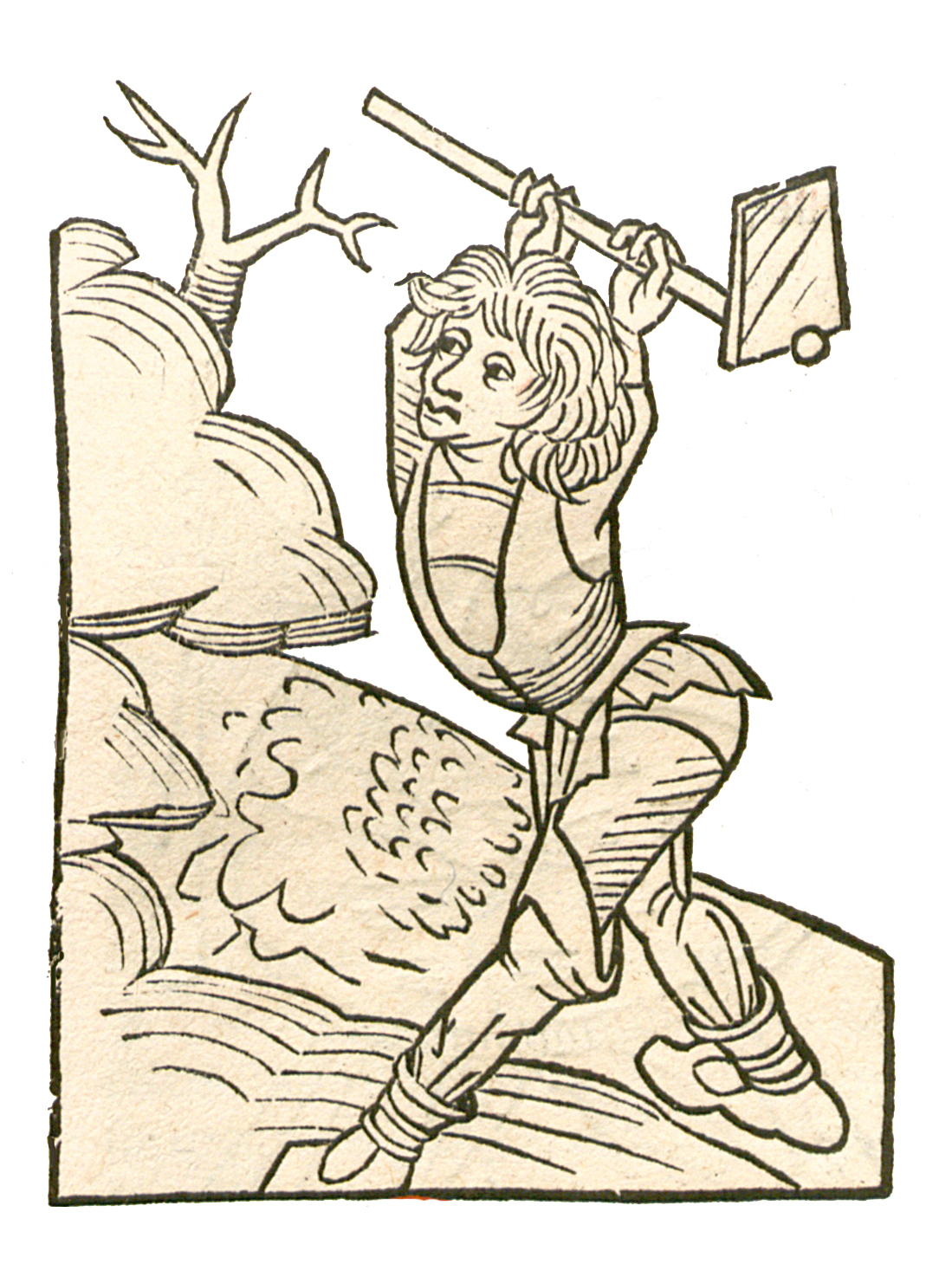
Book V, chapter 13. Argilla – Clay

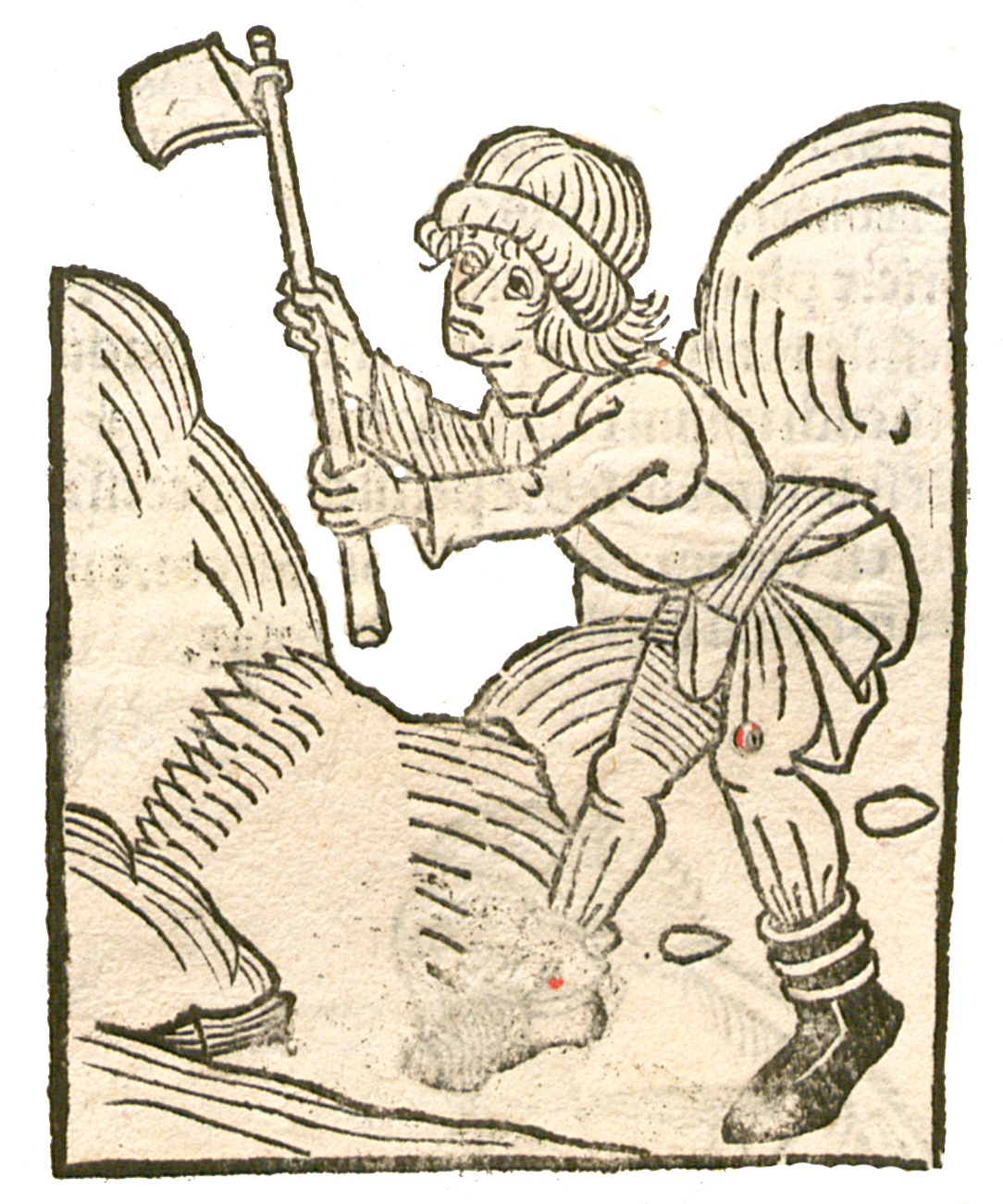
Book V, chapter 16. Bolus – Armenian bole

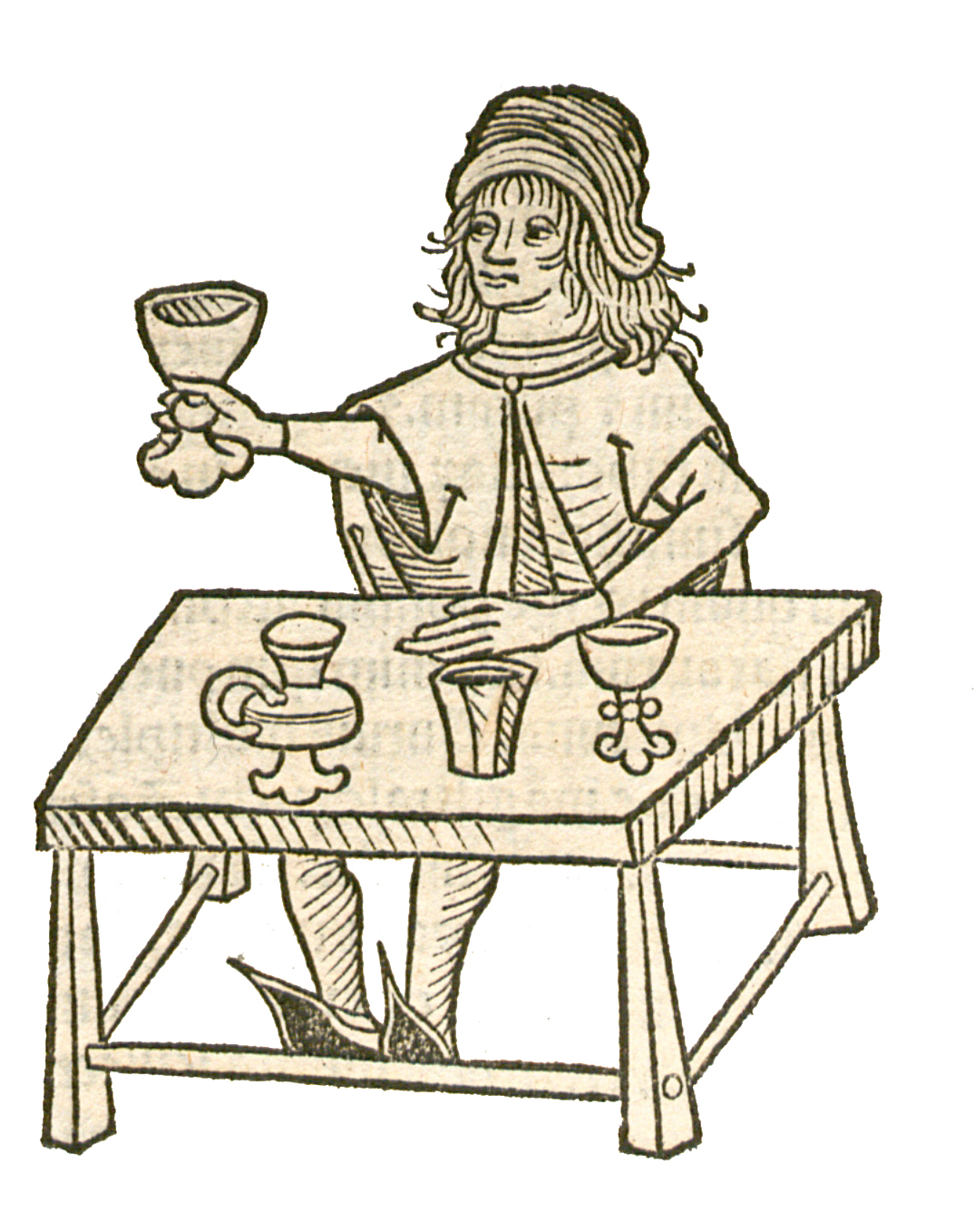
Book V, chapter 18. Aurum – Gold

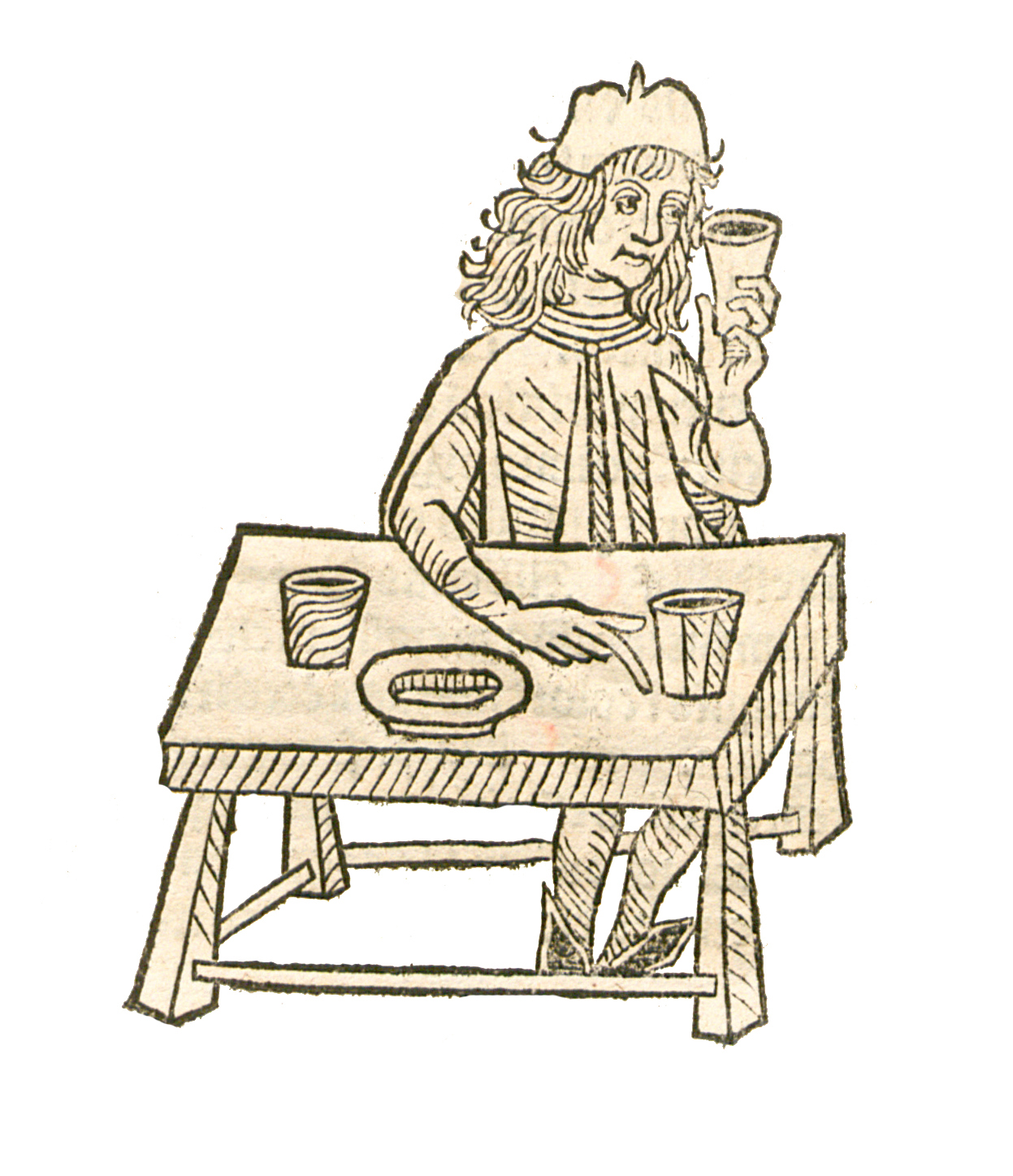
Book V, chapter 20. Argentum – Silver

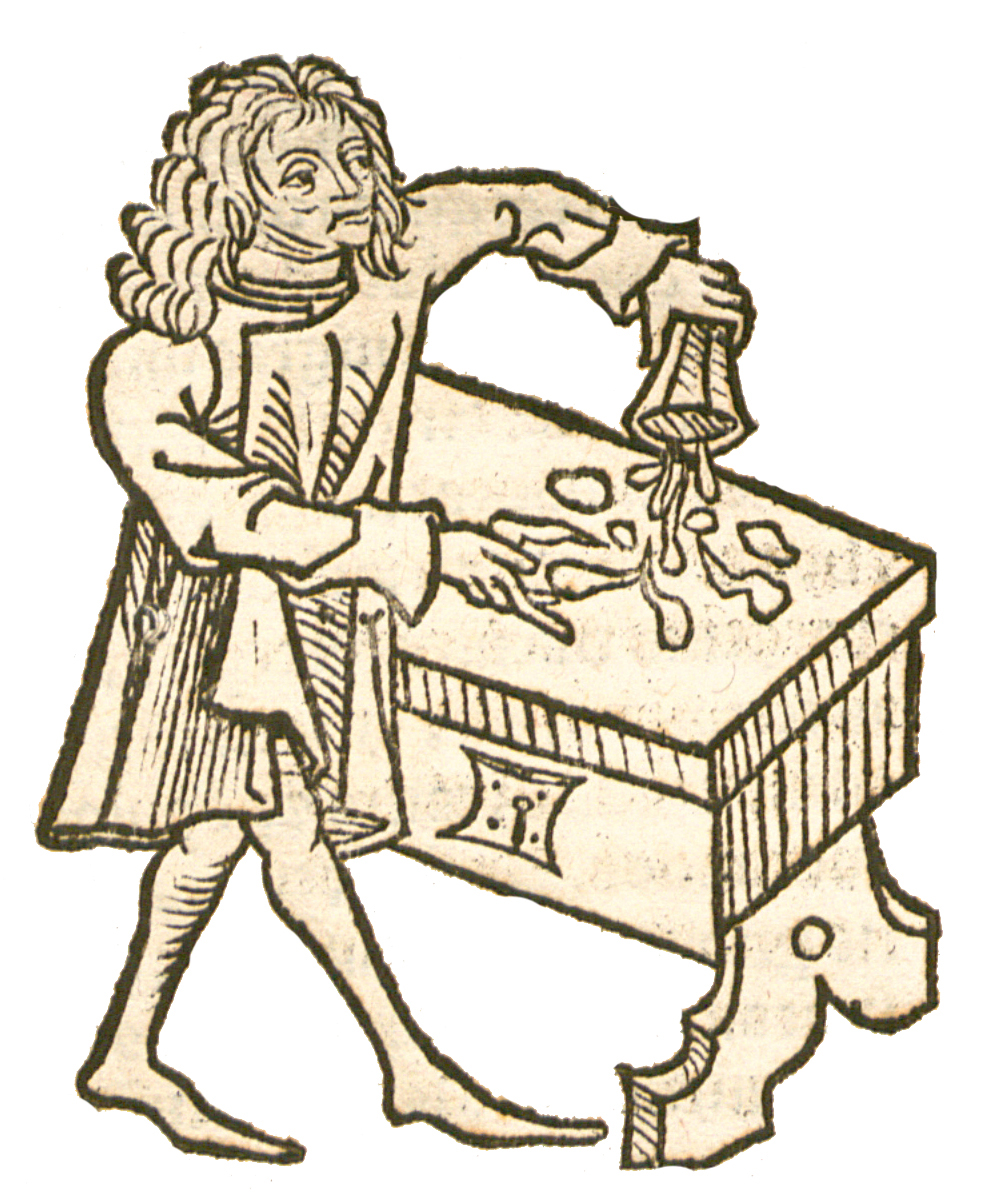
Book V, chapter 21. Argentum vivum – Mercury

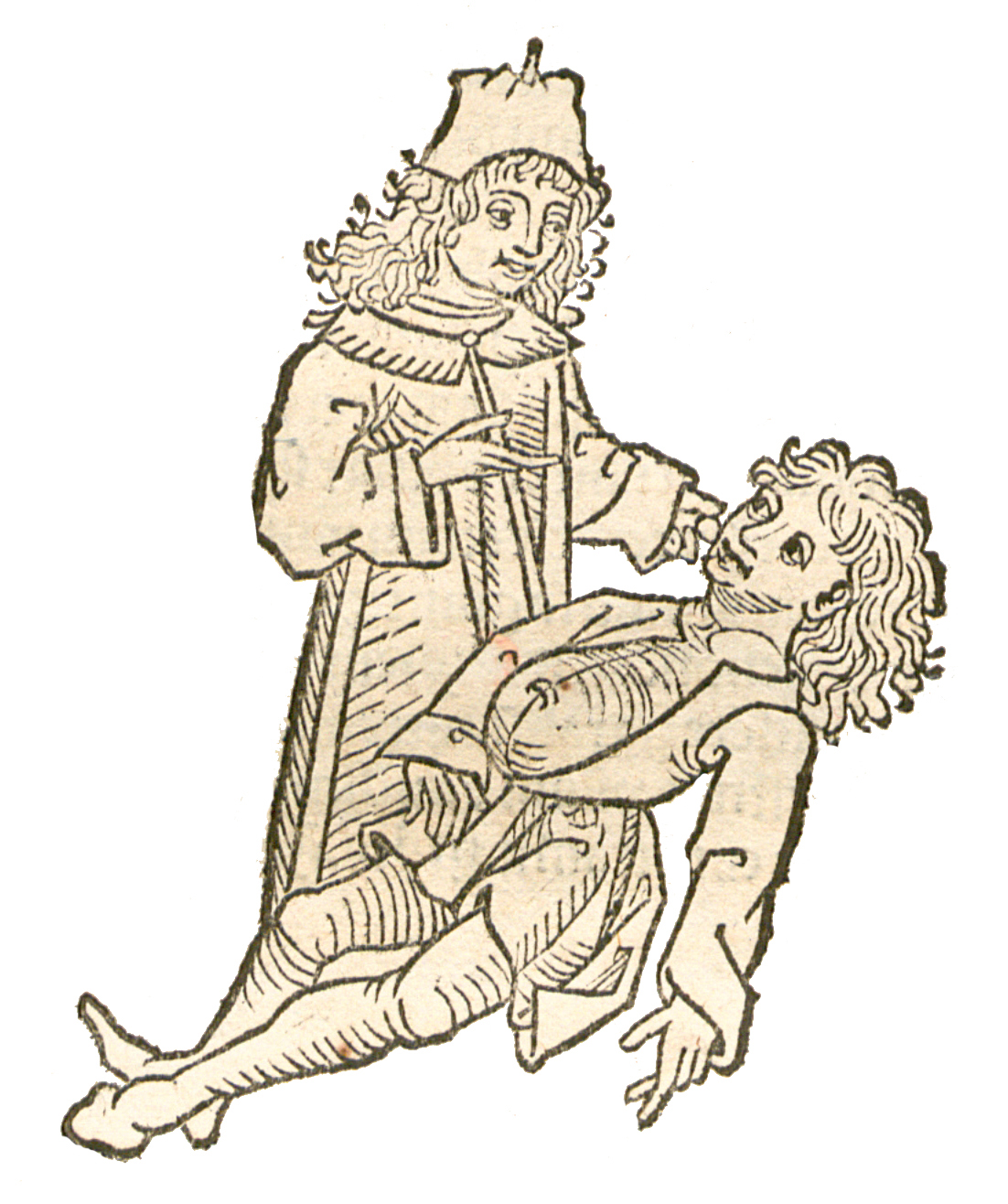
Book V, chapter 24. Bezaar – Bezoar

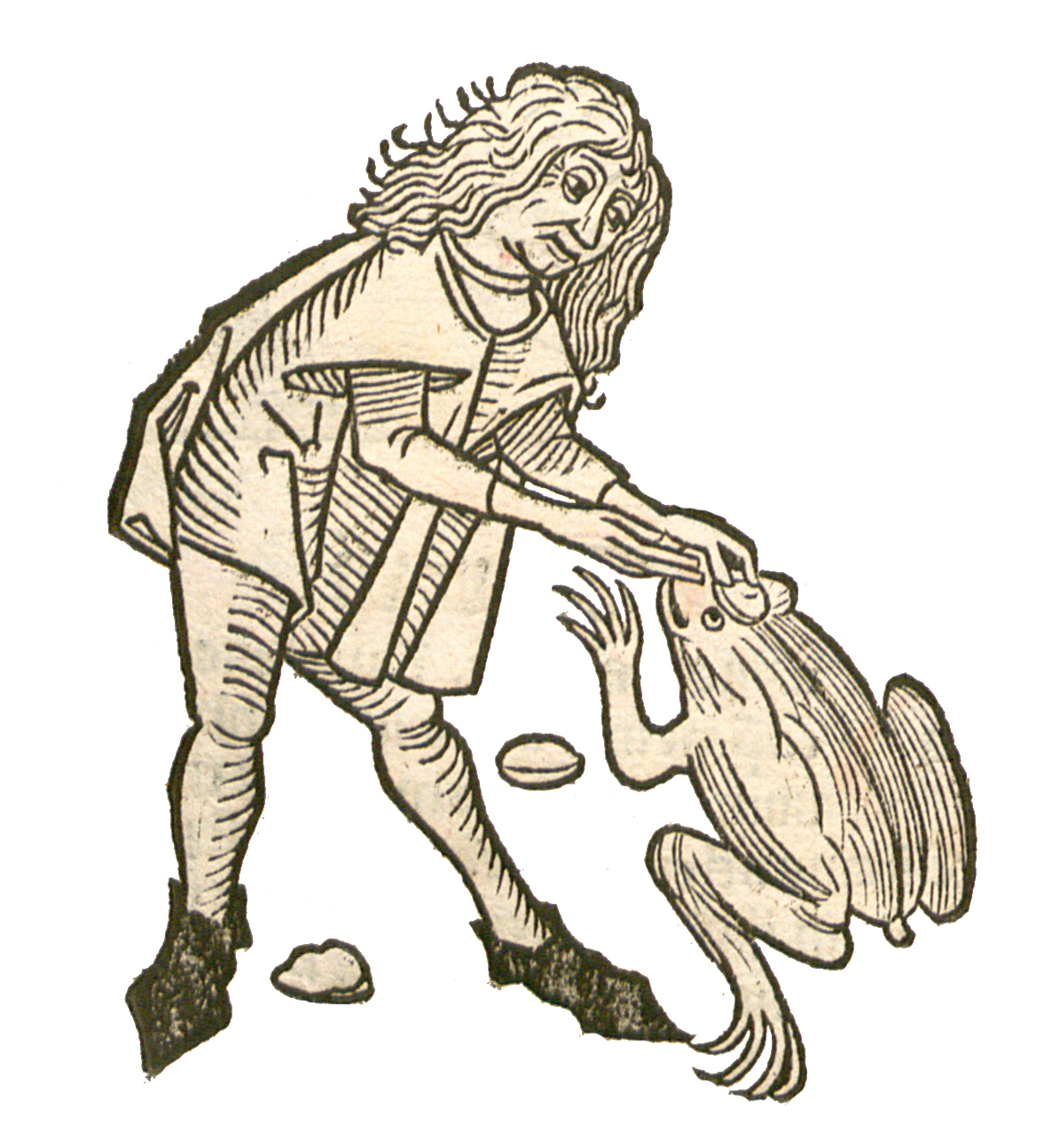
Book V, chapter 27. ..... Borax – Toadstone

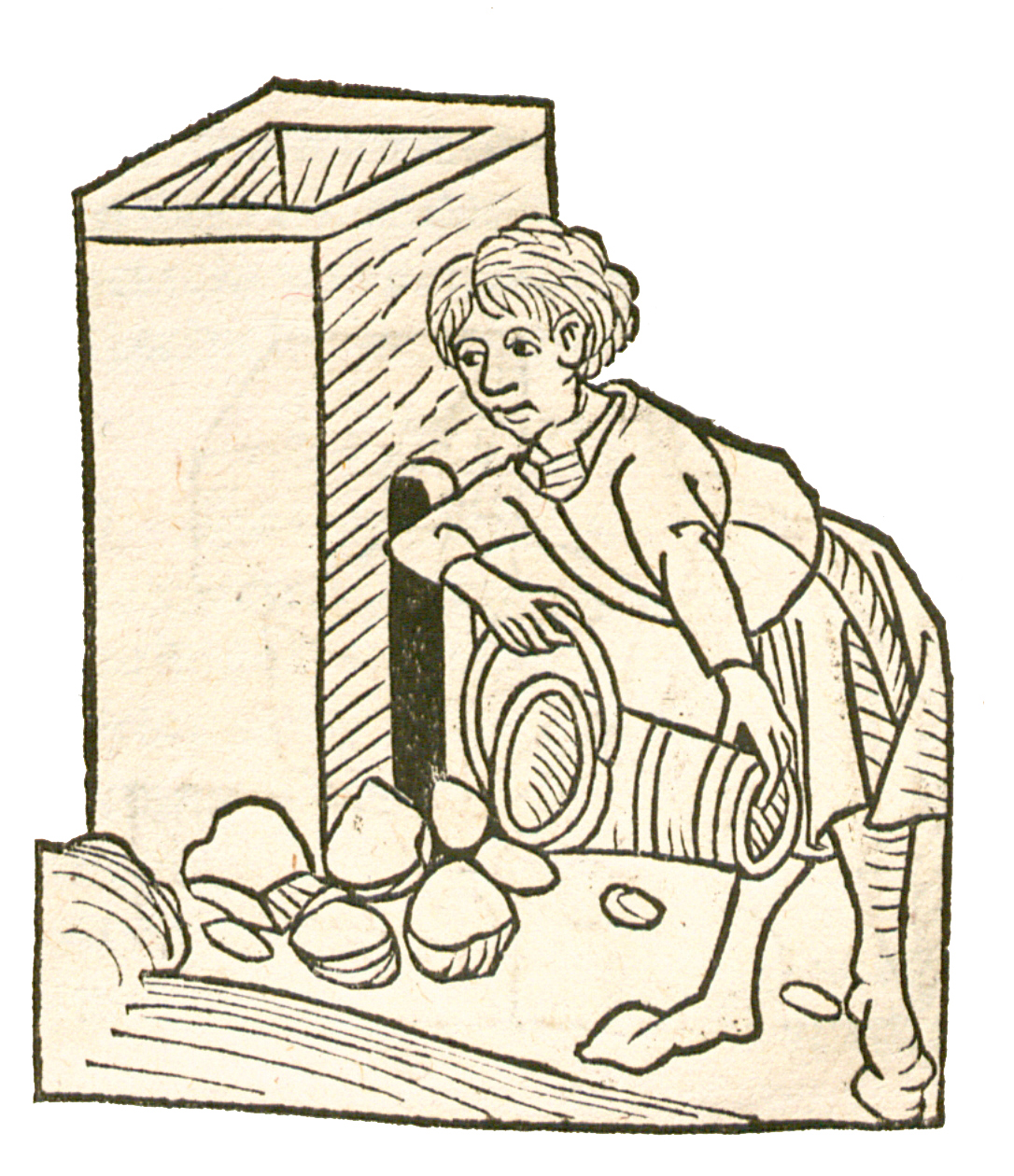
Book V, chapter 30. ..... Calx – Calcium oxide

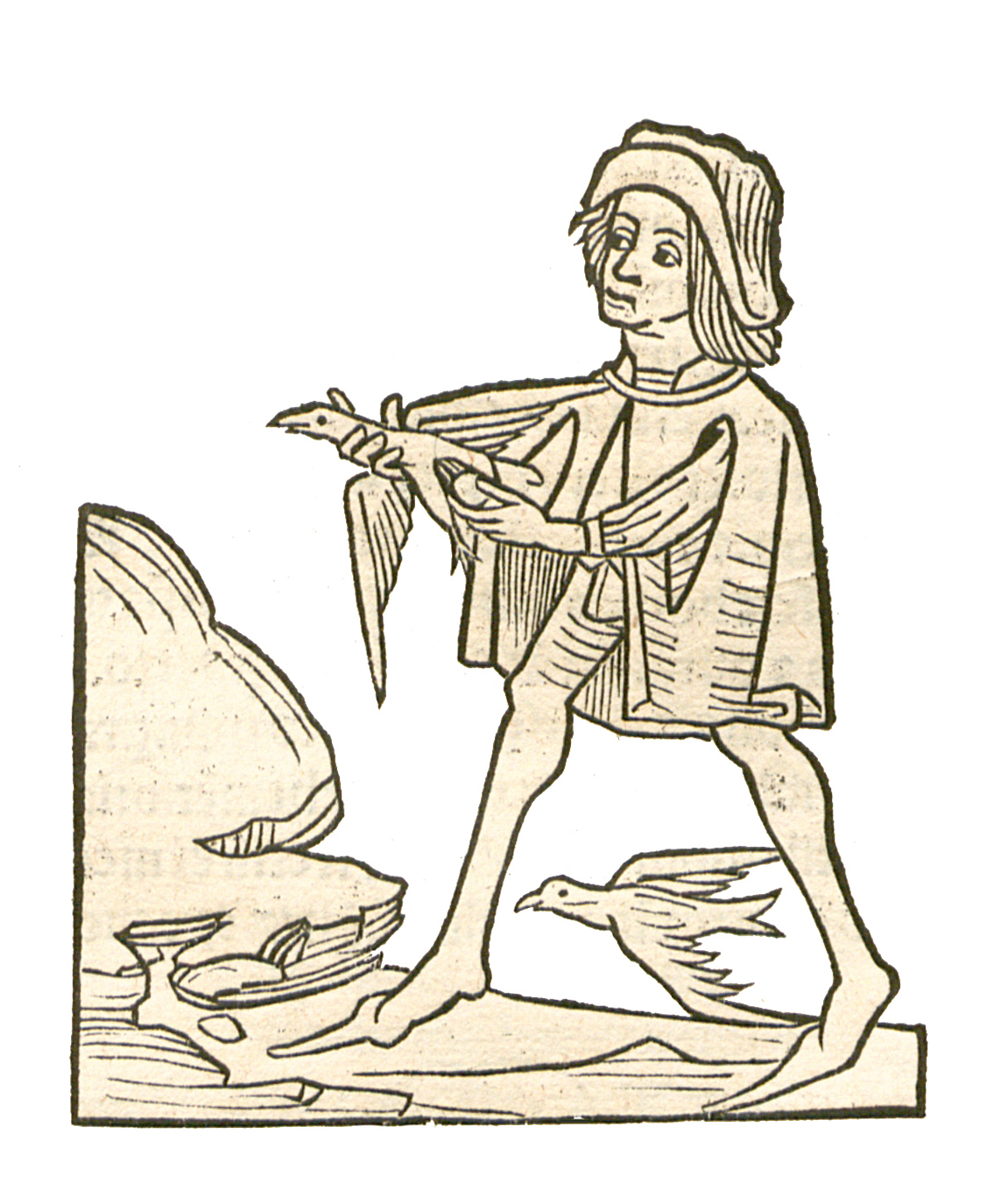
Book V, chapter 33. Celidonius – Stone in the stomac of swallows

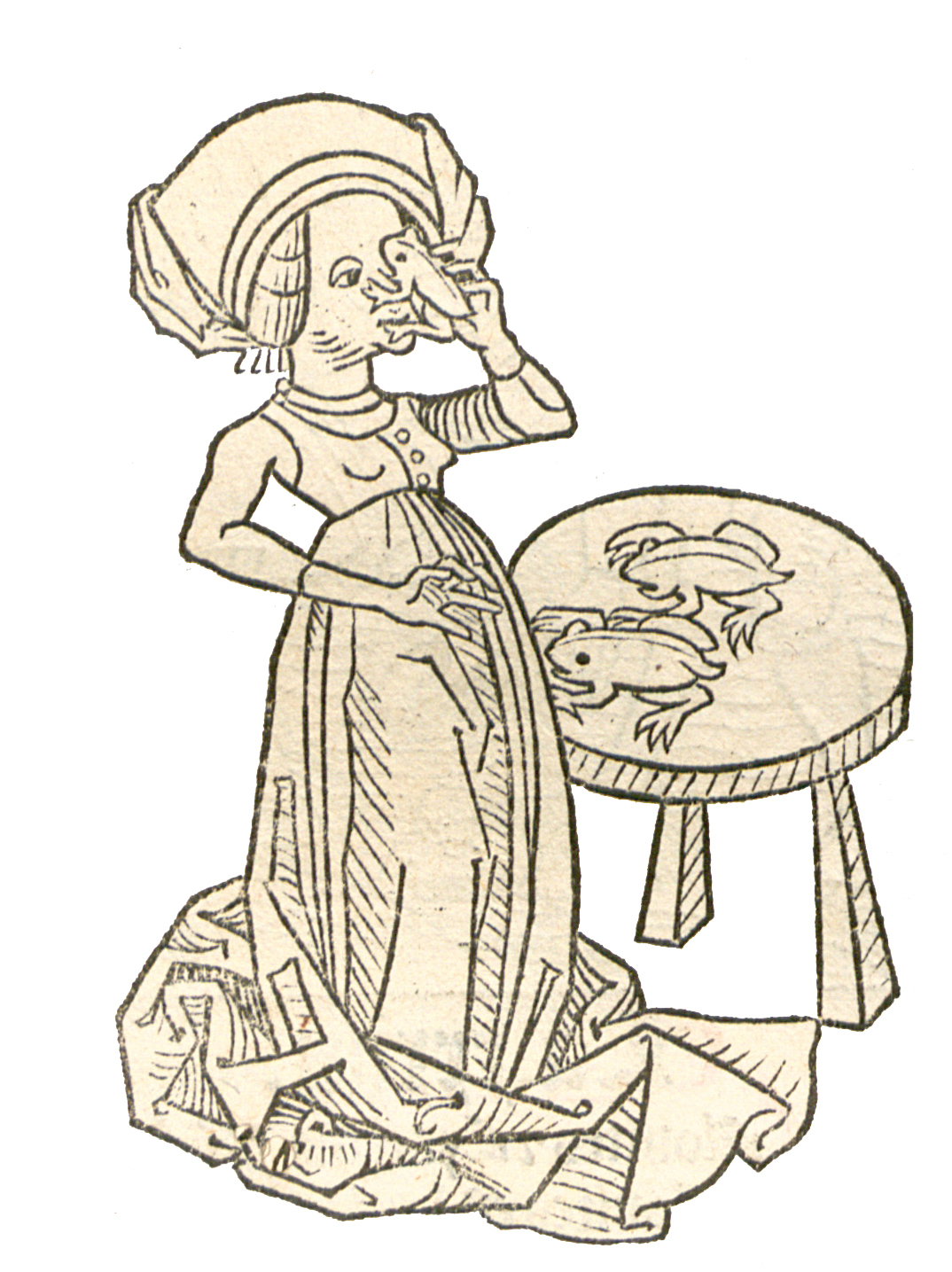
Book V, chapter 35. Cerusa – White lead

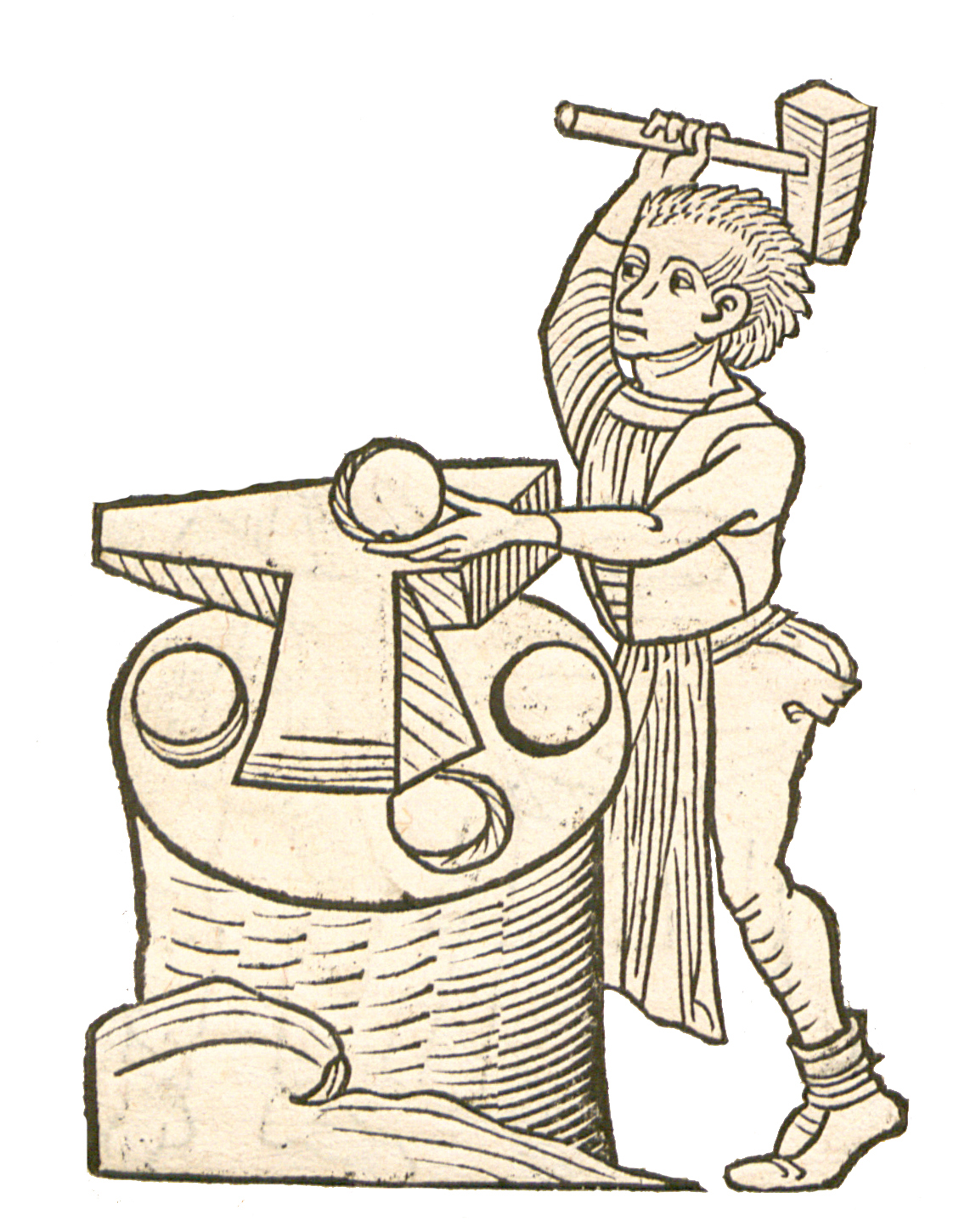
Book V, chapter 46. Cuprum – Copper

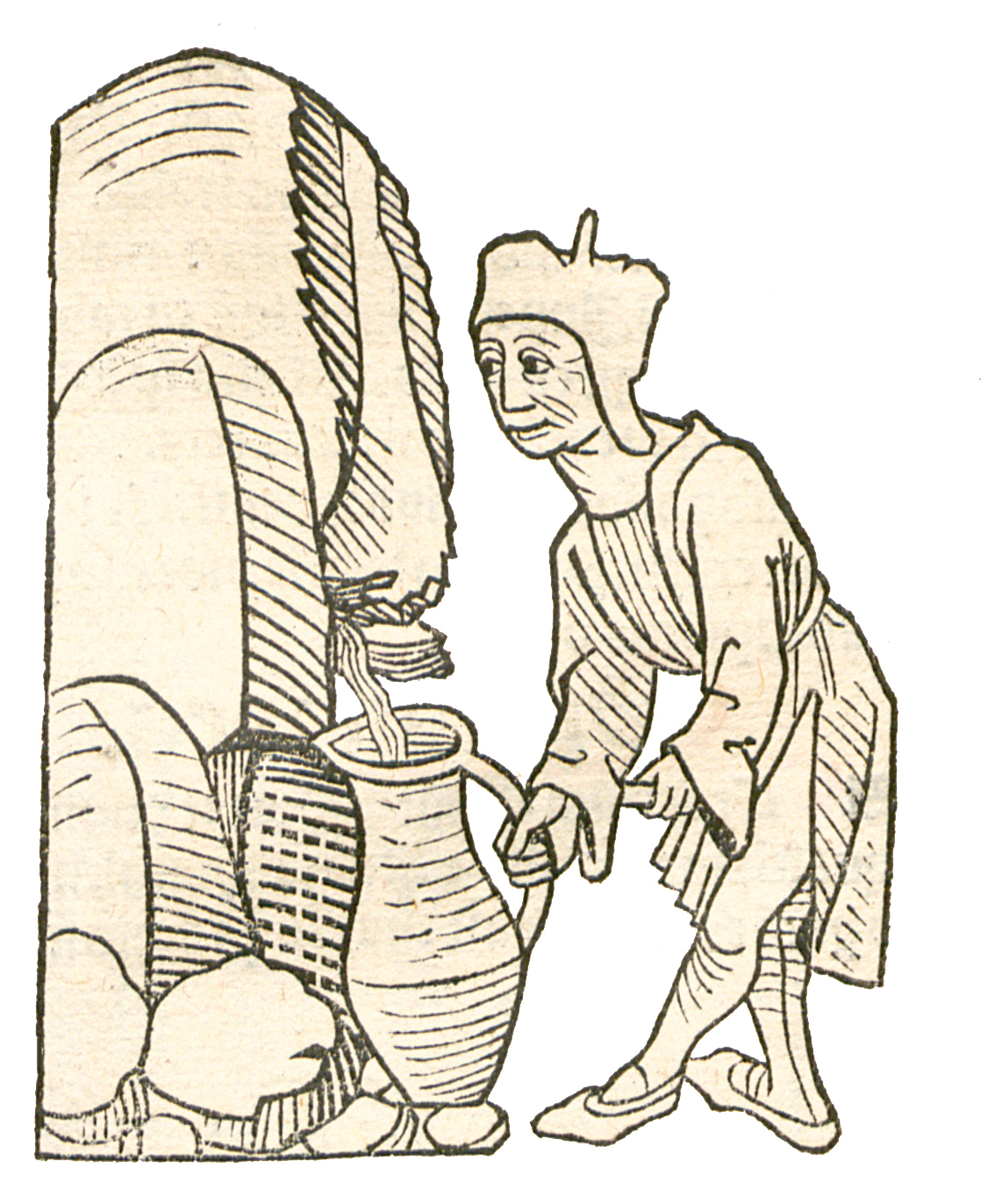
Book V, chapter 101. Petroleum – Petroleum

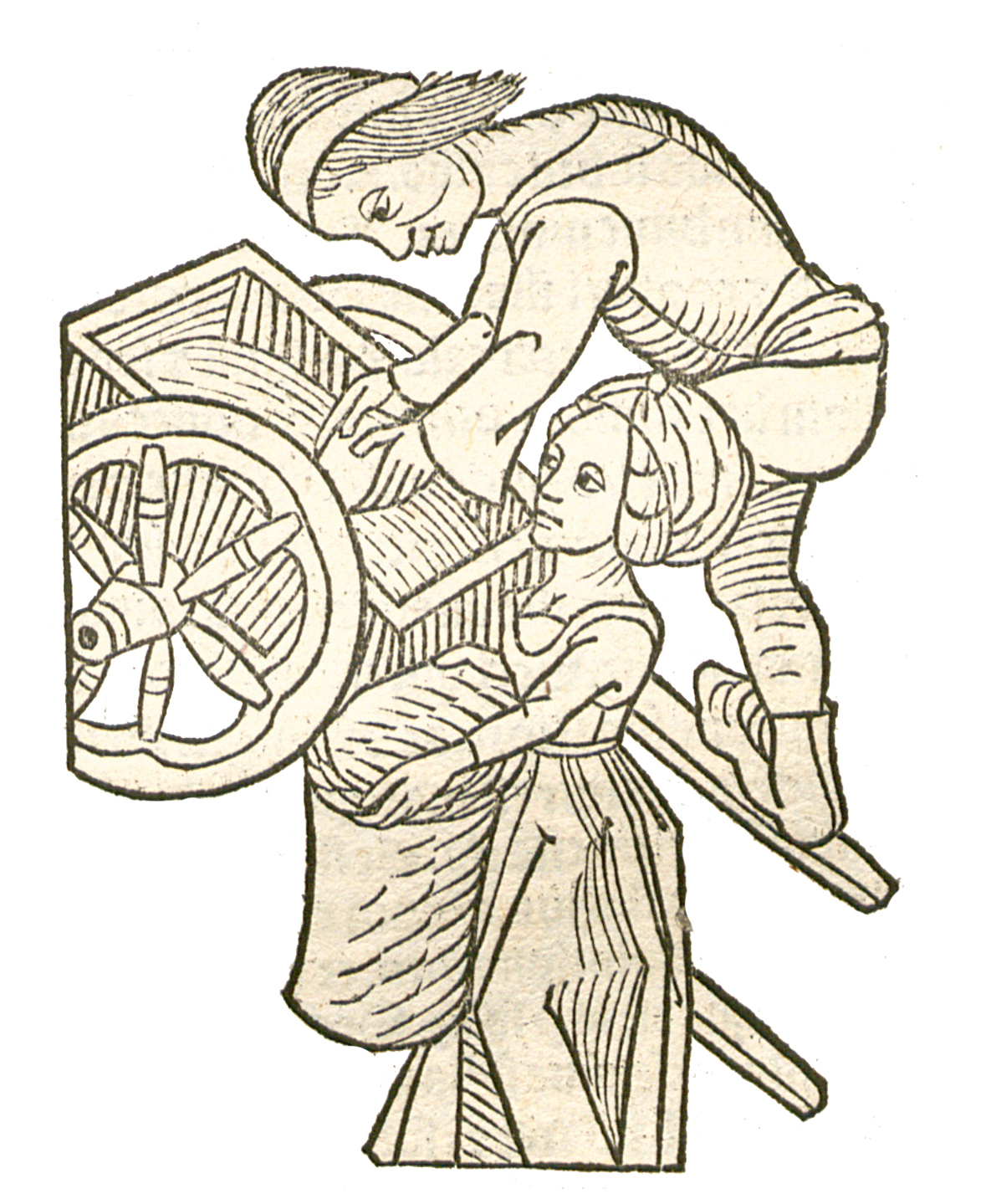
Book V, chapter 124. ..... Sal – Salt

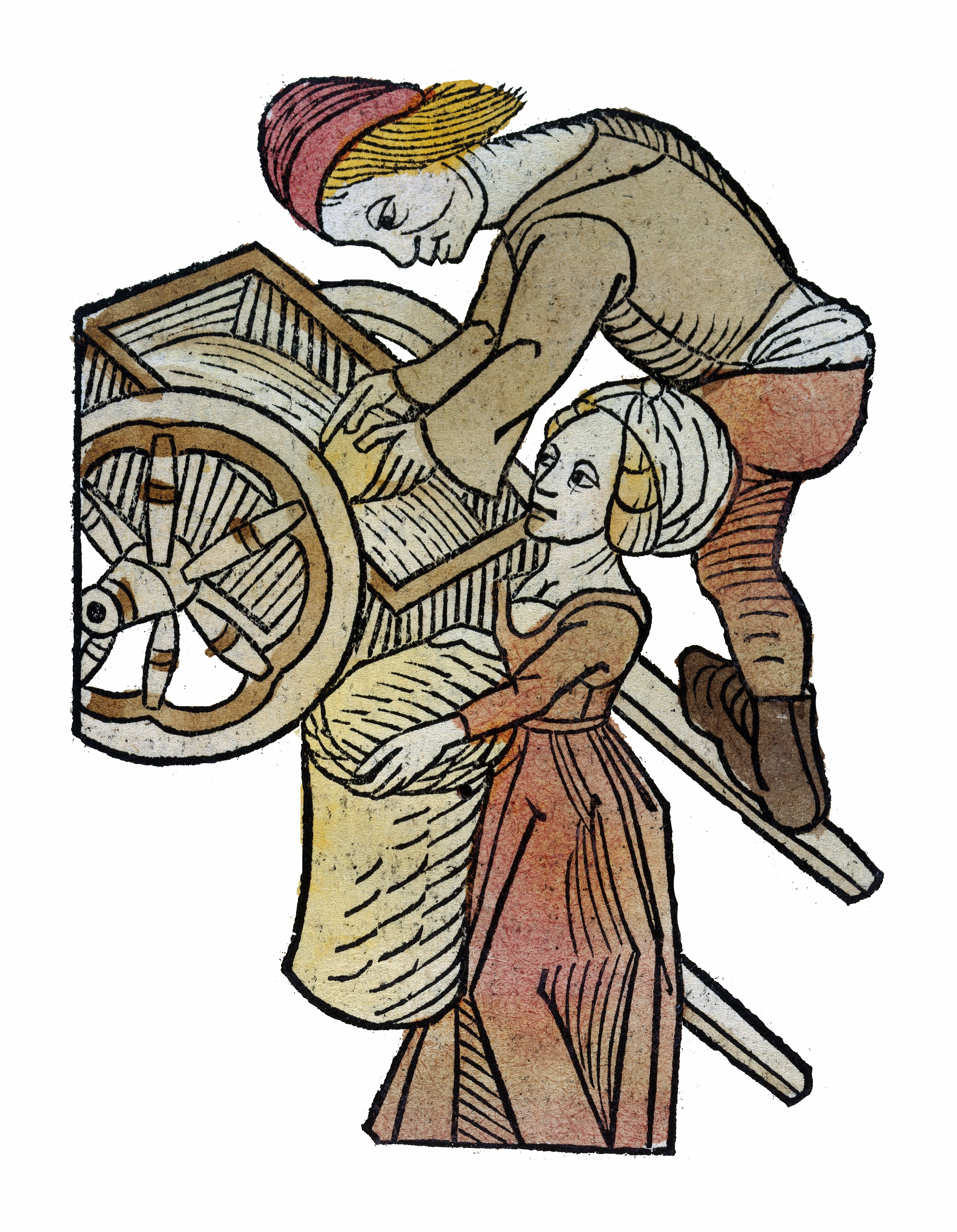
Coulered copy

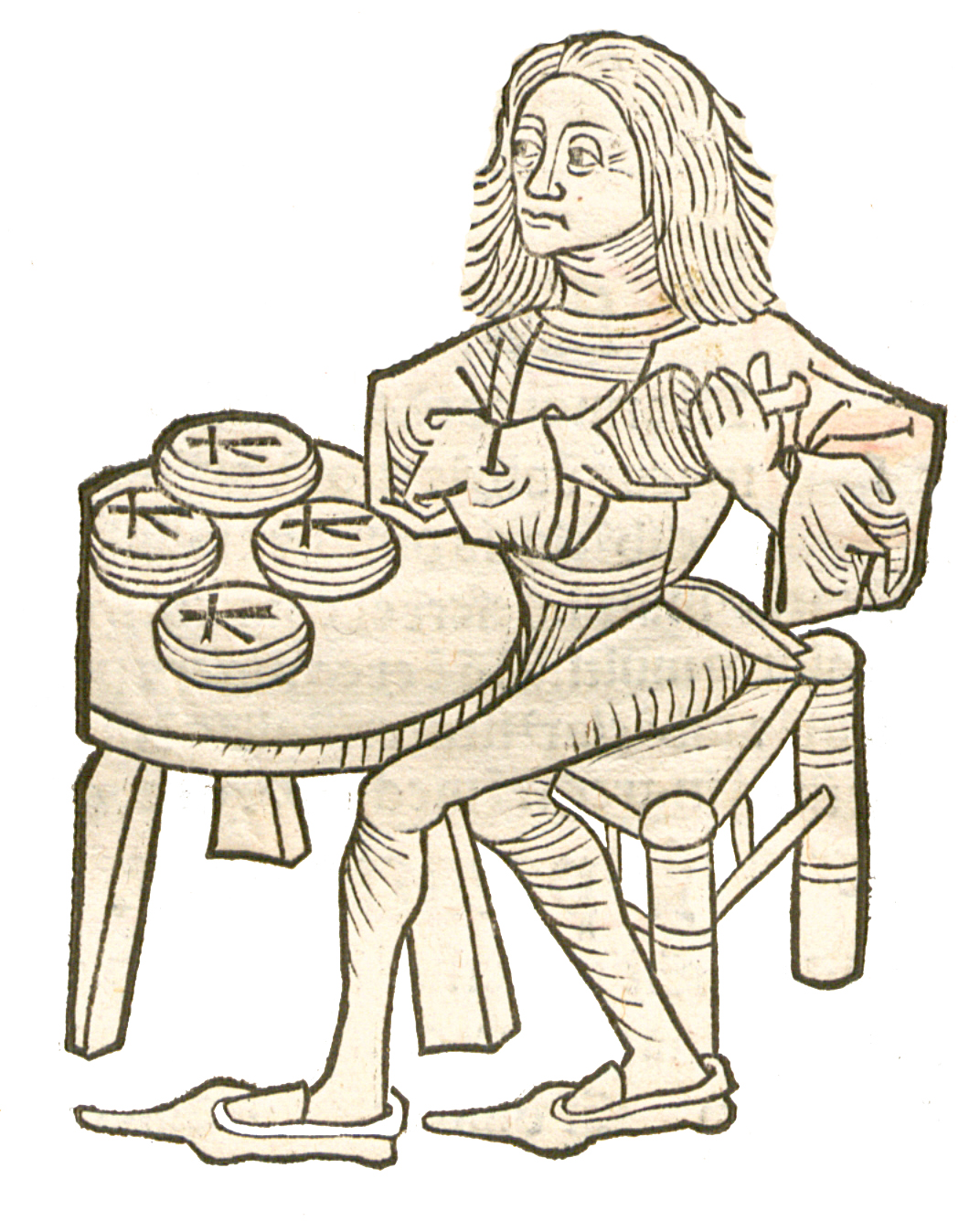
Book V, chapter 130. Terra sigillata

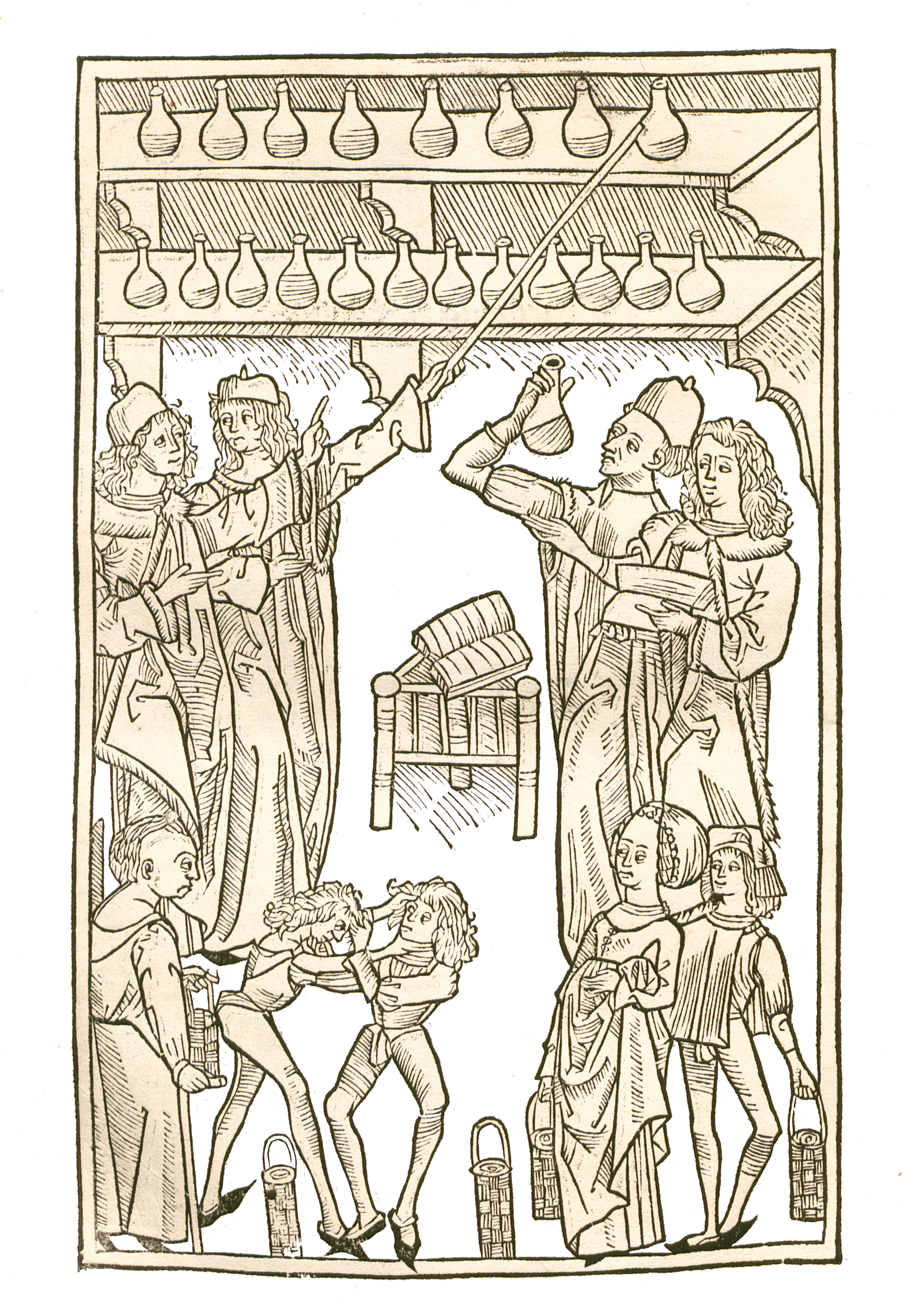
Uroscopy

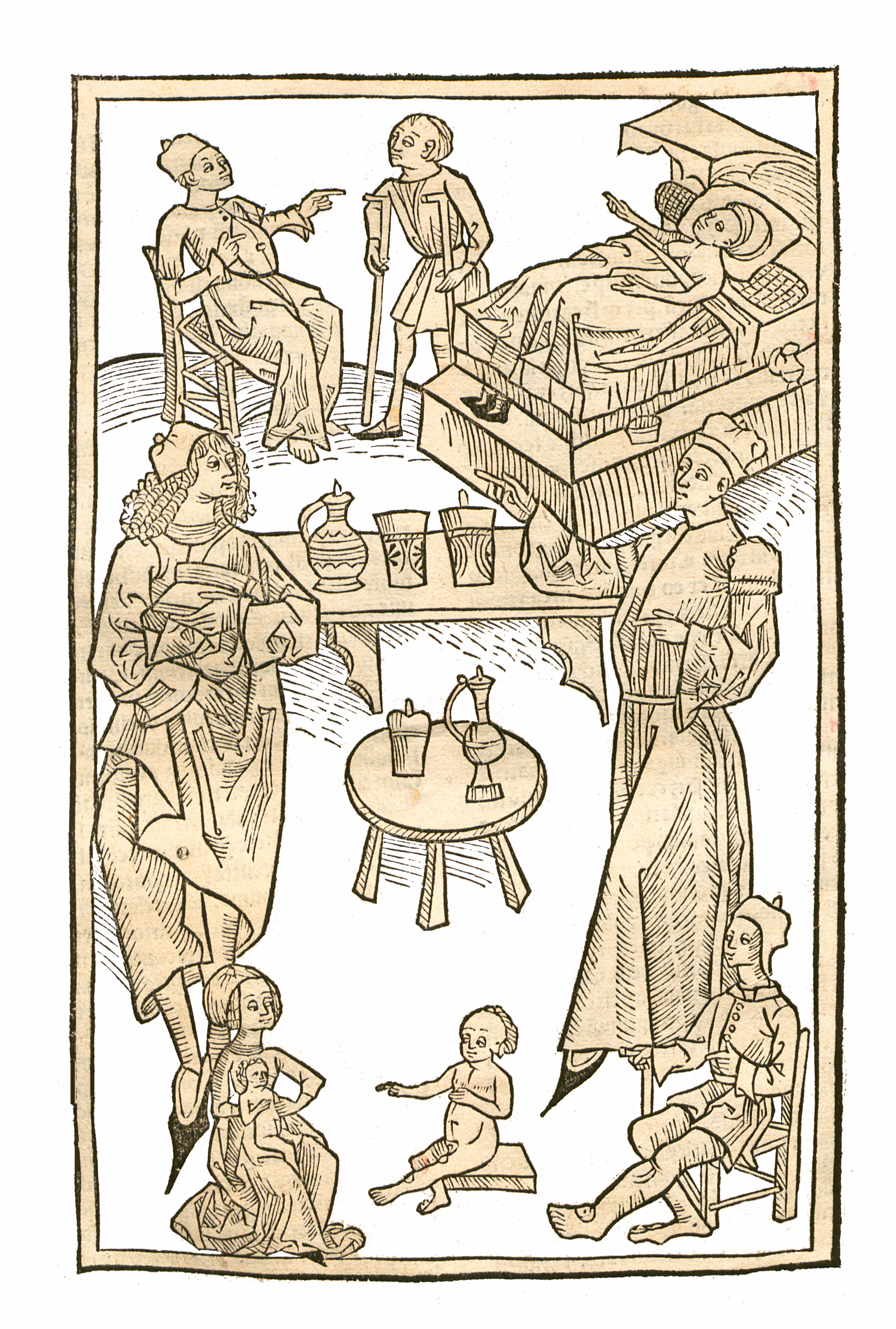
Physicians and patients

== In culture ==
The University of Sydney comments that "The rich variety of the woodcuts makes this a very attractive book. The engraver was a skilled craftsman, but there is some botanical retrogression, since he did not always fully understand the plants he was copying from previous cuts."

A copy once owned by the apothecary George Pavius of Aberdeen is held by the University of Aberdeen.
