= Duclos =

Duclos is a surname. Notable people with the surname include:

- Brigitte Duclos (born 1964), Australian television and radio presenter
- Charles Pinot Duclos (1704–1772), a French author
- Gilbert Duclos-Lassalle (born 1954), a former French professional road racing cyclist
- Hervé Duclos-Lassalle (born 1979), a French professional road racing cyclist
- Jacques Duclos (1896–1975), a French Communist politician
- Jean-Yves Duclos (born 1965), a Canadian Liberal politician
- Louis Duclos (born 1939), a Liberal party member of the Canadian House of Commons
- Michelle Duclos (1939–2017), a Canadian television performer and supporter of the Front de Libération du Québec
- Pierre Duclos, a French curler
- Pierre-Ludovic Duclos (born 1986), a Canadian former professional tour tennis player
- Samuel Cottereau du Clos (1598–1685), French chemist
