= Duclos-Lassalle =

Duclos-Lassalle is a surname of French origin. Notable people with that name include:

- Gilbert Duclos-Lassalle (born 1954), French cyclist, father of Hervé
- Hervé Duclos-Lassalle (born 1979), French cyclist. son of Gilbert

== See also ==
- Duclos, a surname
- Lassalle, a surname
