= Liber de arte distillandi de simplicibus =

16th-century German distillation book

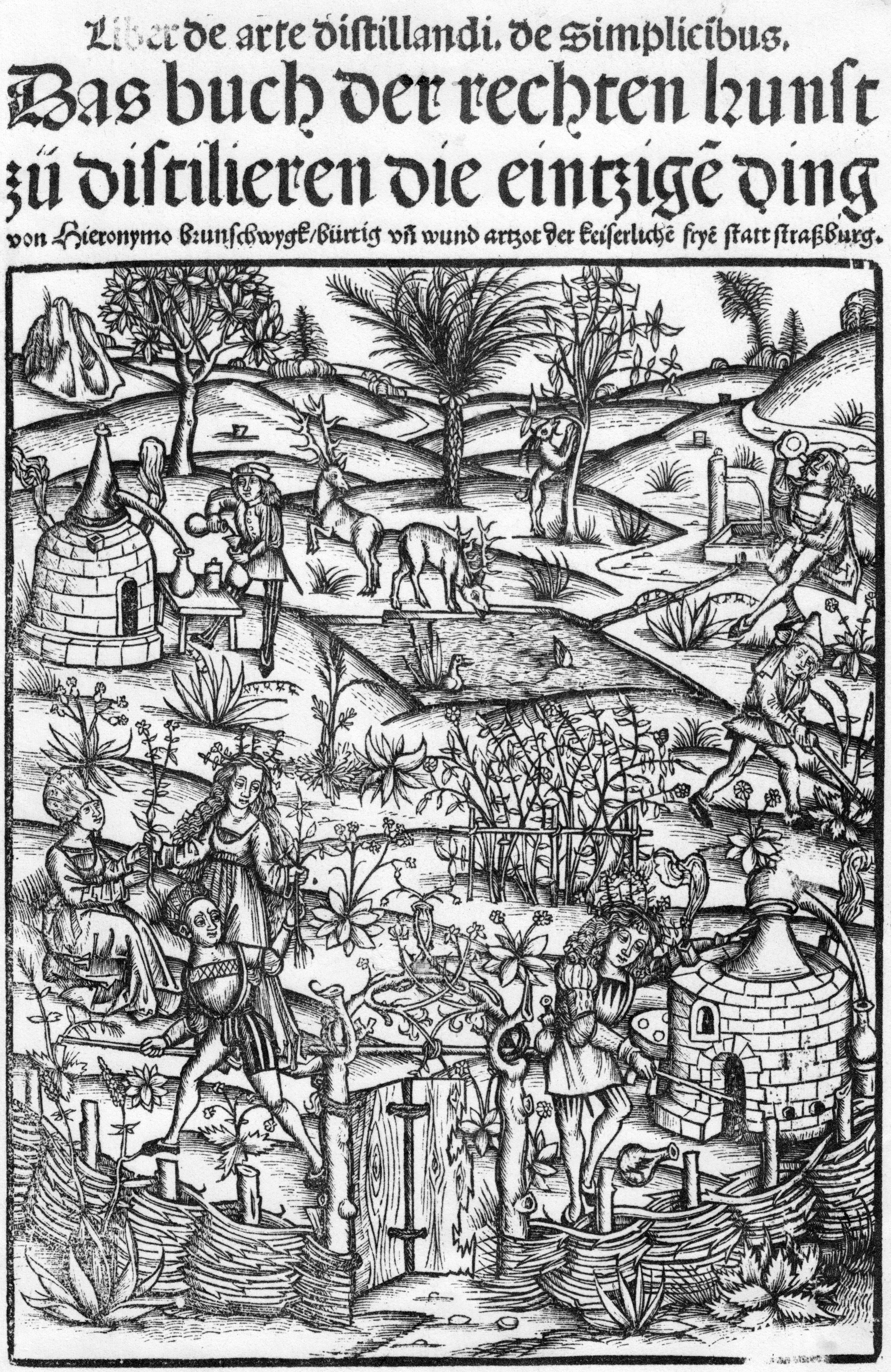
- Author: Hieronymus Brunschwig
- Language: German
- Genre: Manual
- Publisher: Johann Grüninger
- Publication date: 8 May 1500
- Publication place: Strasbourg, Germany
- Website: loc.gov/item/49043561

The Liber de arte distillandi de simplicibus (Book on the art of distillation out of simple ingredients [«simplicia»] or Kleines Destillierbuch) is a German book by Hieronymus Brunschwig published on 8 May 1500 by Johann Grüninger. It was the first book on the subject of distillation written in the German language, and was also the first book on chemistry published in the English vernacular. The Liber consists of a manual on how to distill medicinal waters, and combines traditional practices with technical instructions.

== Background ==
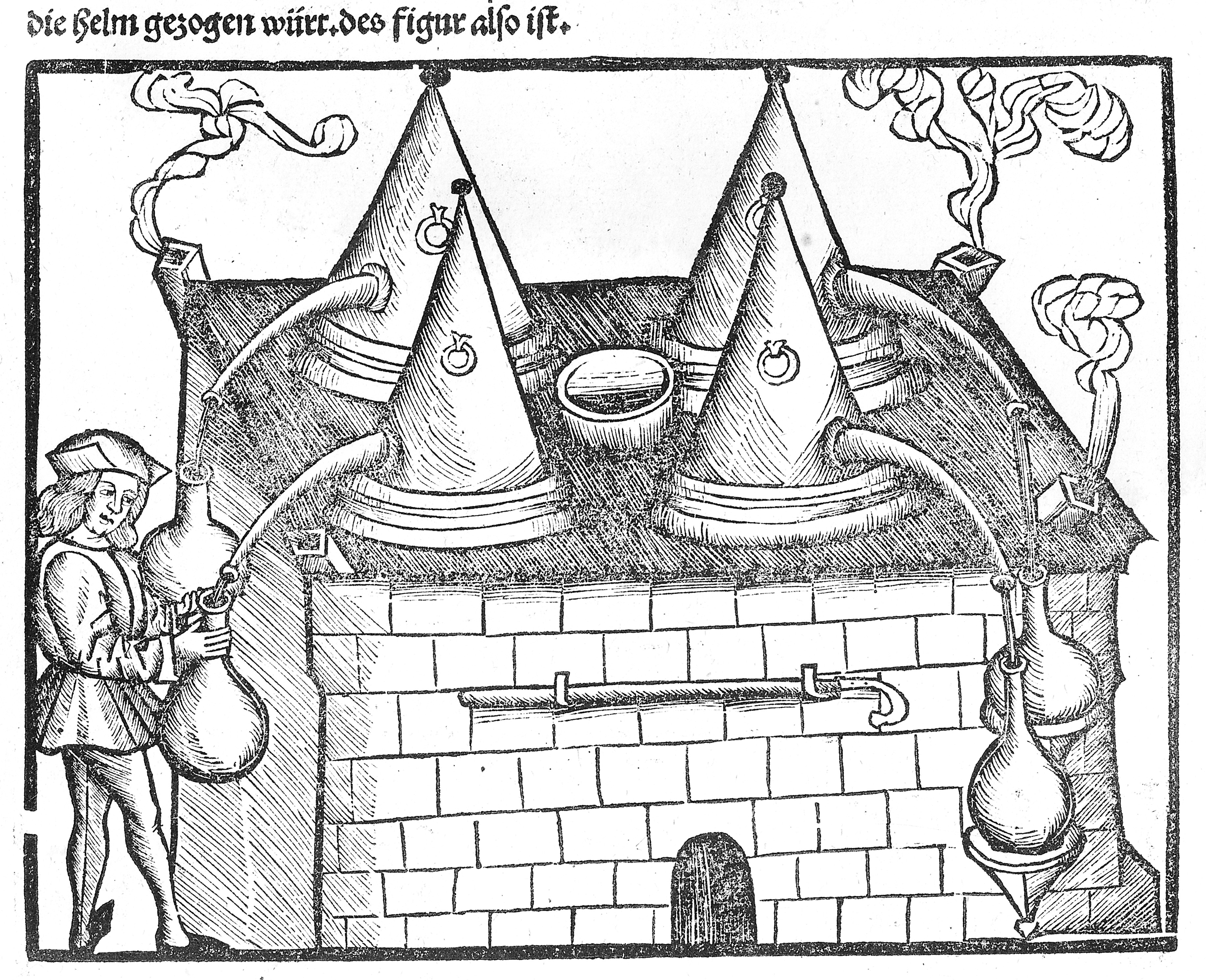
Woodcut illustration of an alchemist operating a still

The Liber de arte distillandi de simplicibus, despite its Latin title, was written fully in German, and is the first work on distillation that was printed in the language, with previous works having been written in Latin. It is one of several manuals and treatises on scientific topics by Hieronymus Brunschwig, and is the first of his books on distillation, followed by the Liber de arte distillandi de compositis (Großes Destillierbuch) in 1512.

The Kleines Destillierbuch draws heavily from earlier alchemical works, though there are only a few explicit references to alchemy within the text itself. Specifically, Brunschwig cites the 14th-century alchemist Jean de Roquetaillade frequently in reference to the concept of "quintessence" which is a concept that derives from Roquetaillade's book De consideratione quintae essentiae. In both Roqeutaillade's and Brunschwig's approaches, the goal of alchemy and distillation is to strip away the earthly four elements to leave only the heavenly quintessence, a substance that has beneficial properties. However, Brunschwig differs from Roquetaillade in that he does not purport that distillate substances are entirely heavenly essences, only that they are more heavenly than their non-distilled counterparts.

== Contents ==
The Kleines Destillierbuch consists of a total of 230 pages divided in fourths. It is split into three parts, the first with 23 chapters explaining the process of distillation, the second comprising a list of plants whose products can be distilled, and the third consisting of an index of diseases which can be treated by the medicinal waters produced through distillation. Each page has two columns with 47 lines of text, and many have a woodcut illustration of varying sizes of stills, plants or animals. Most of these woodcuts had been used before in Johann Grüningers press for books such as the Buch der cirurgia (1497) or Grüningers reprinting (1497) of the Hortus Sanitatis (first edition Mainz 1491), or they were copies of these formerly used woodcuts.

== Illustrations ==
=== Types of illustrations of plants using the same woodblock a second time ===
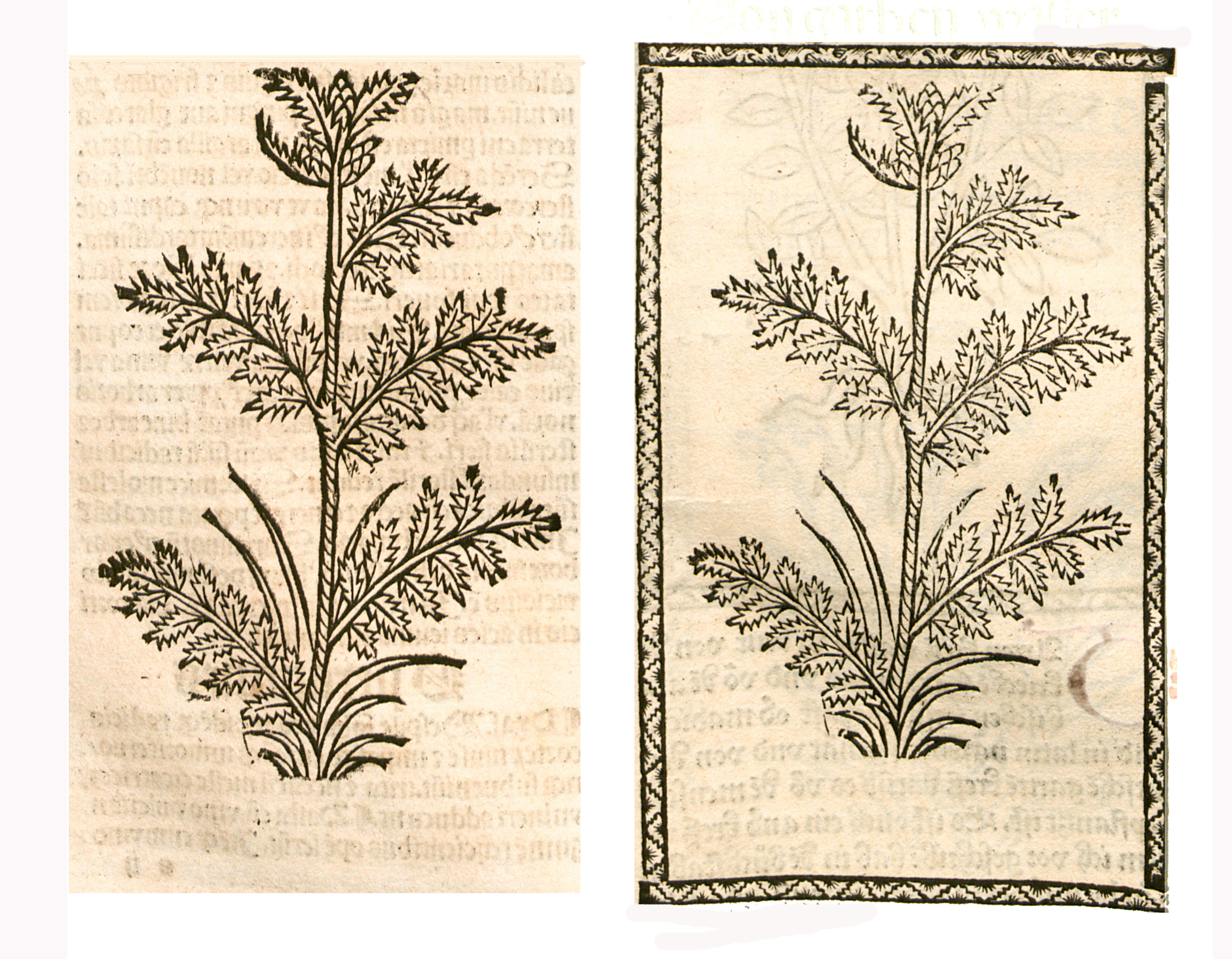
Achillea millefolium. Left: Hortus Sanitatis Straßburg 1497 (I, 295). Right: Kleines Destillierbuch (Blatt 54r)

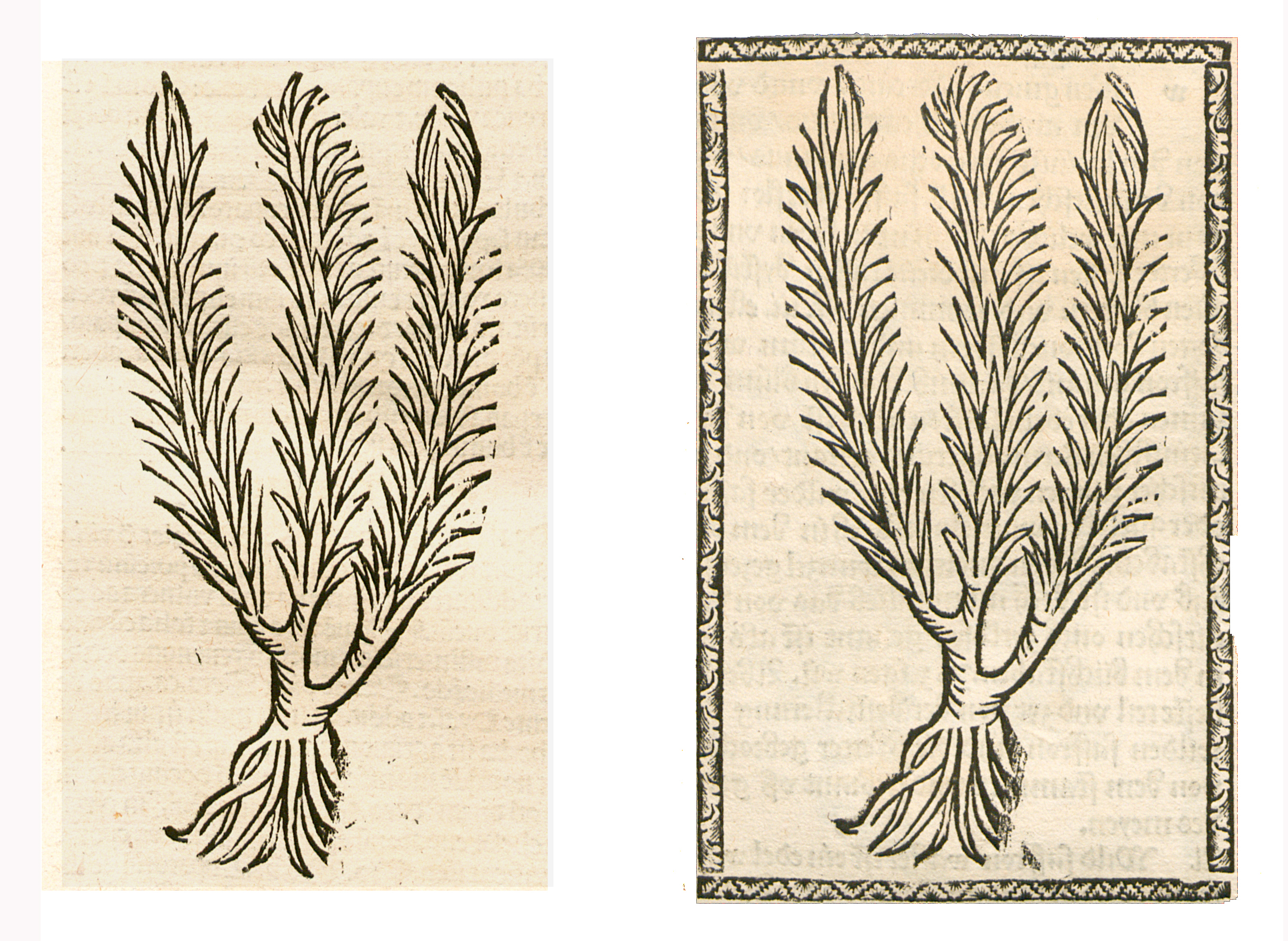
Adonis vernalis. Left: Hortus Sanitatis (BSB), Straßburg 1497 (I, 165). Right: Kleines Destillierbuch (Blatt 121v)

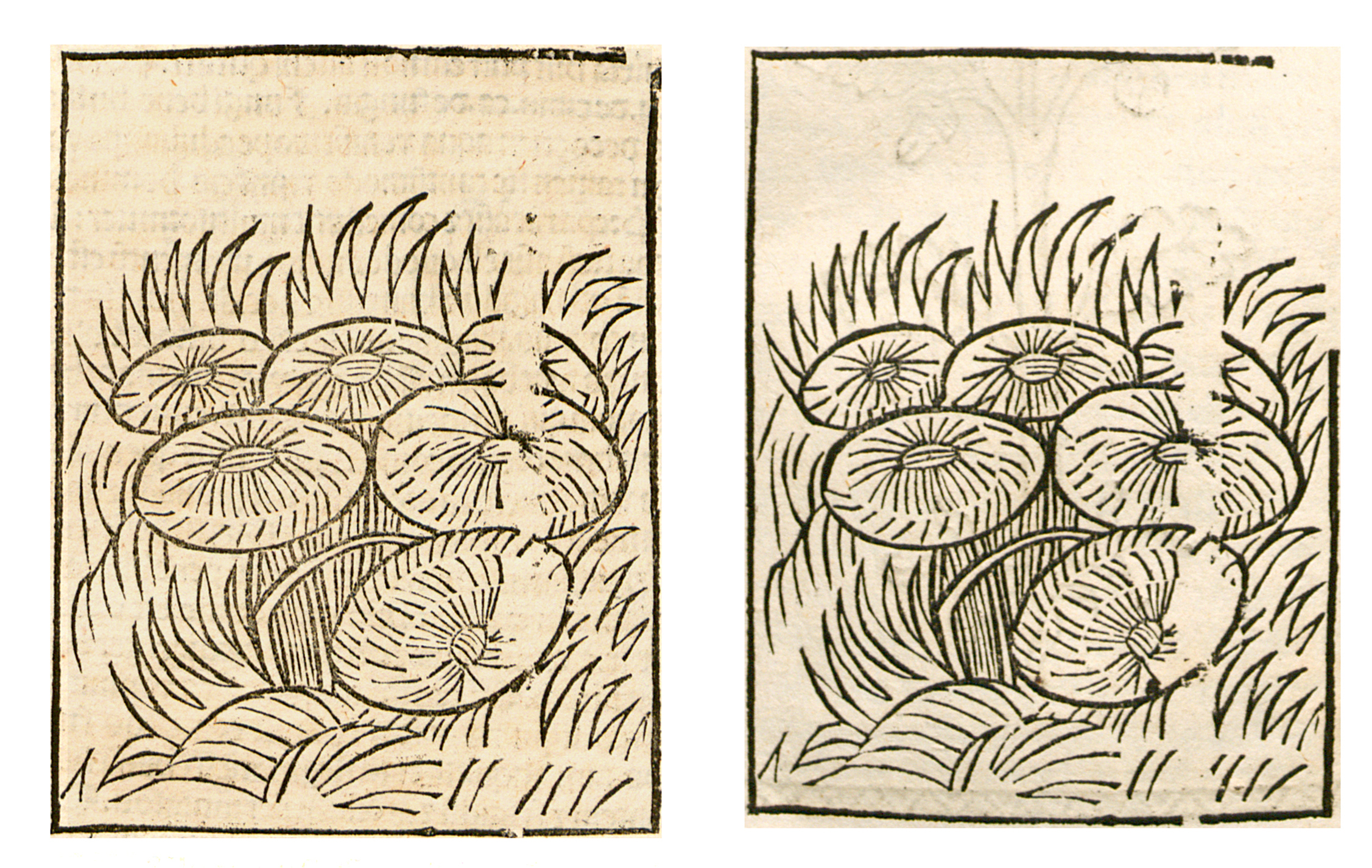
Agaricus campestris. Left: Hortus Sanitatis, Straßburg 1497 (I, 203). Right: Kleines Destillierbuch (Blatt 42v)

=== Types of illustrations of animals using the same woodblock a second time ===
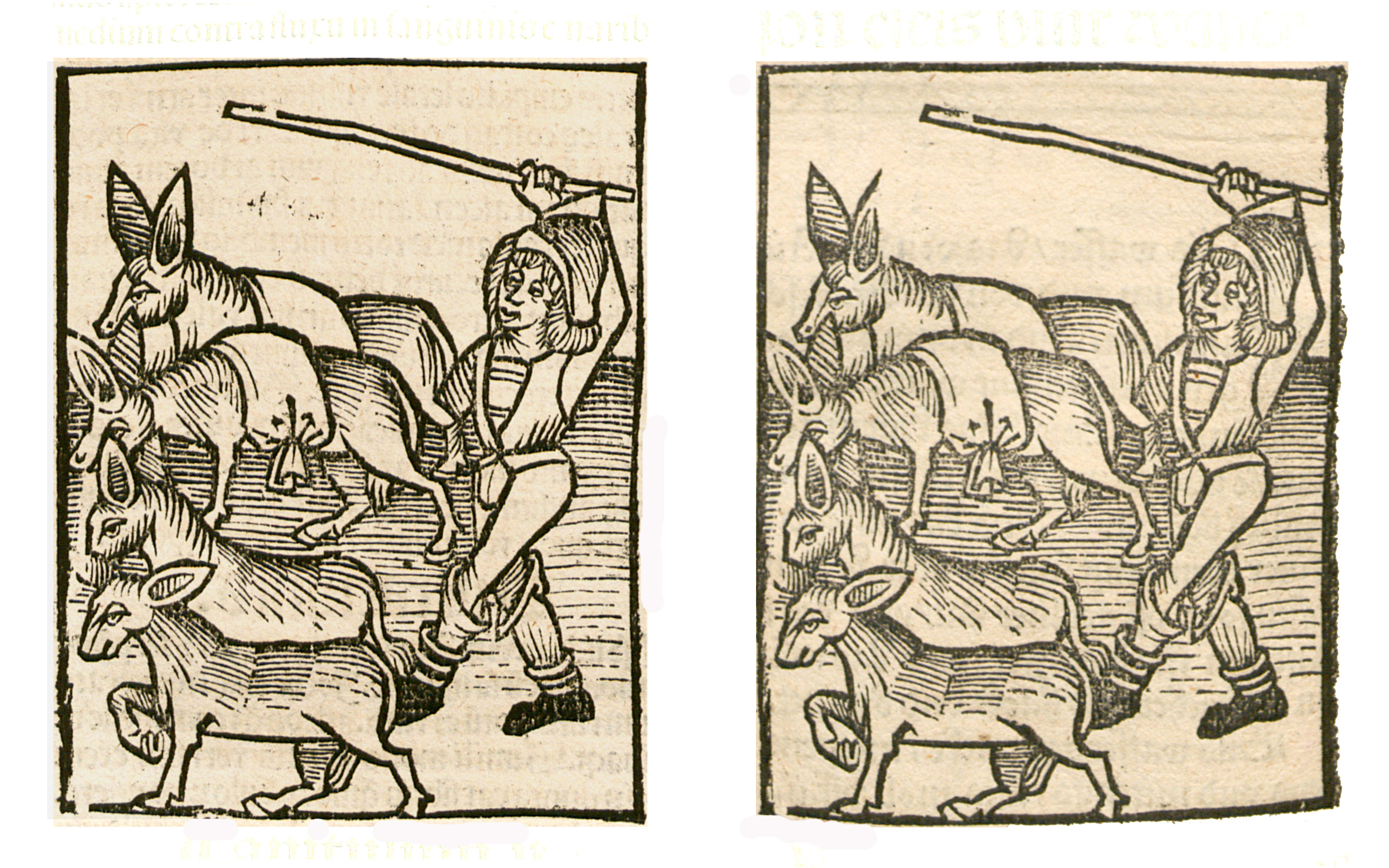
Equus asinus. Left: Hortus Sanitatis, Straßburg 1497 (II, 5). Right: Kleines Destillierbuch (Blatt 45v)

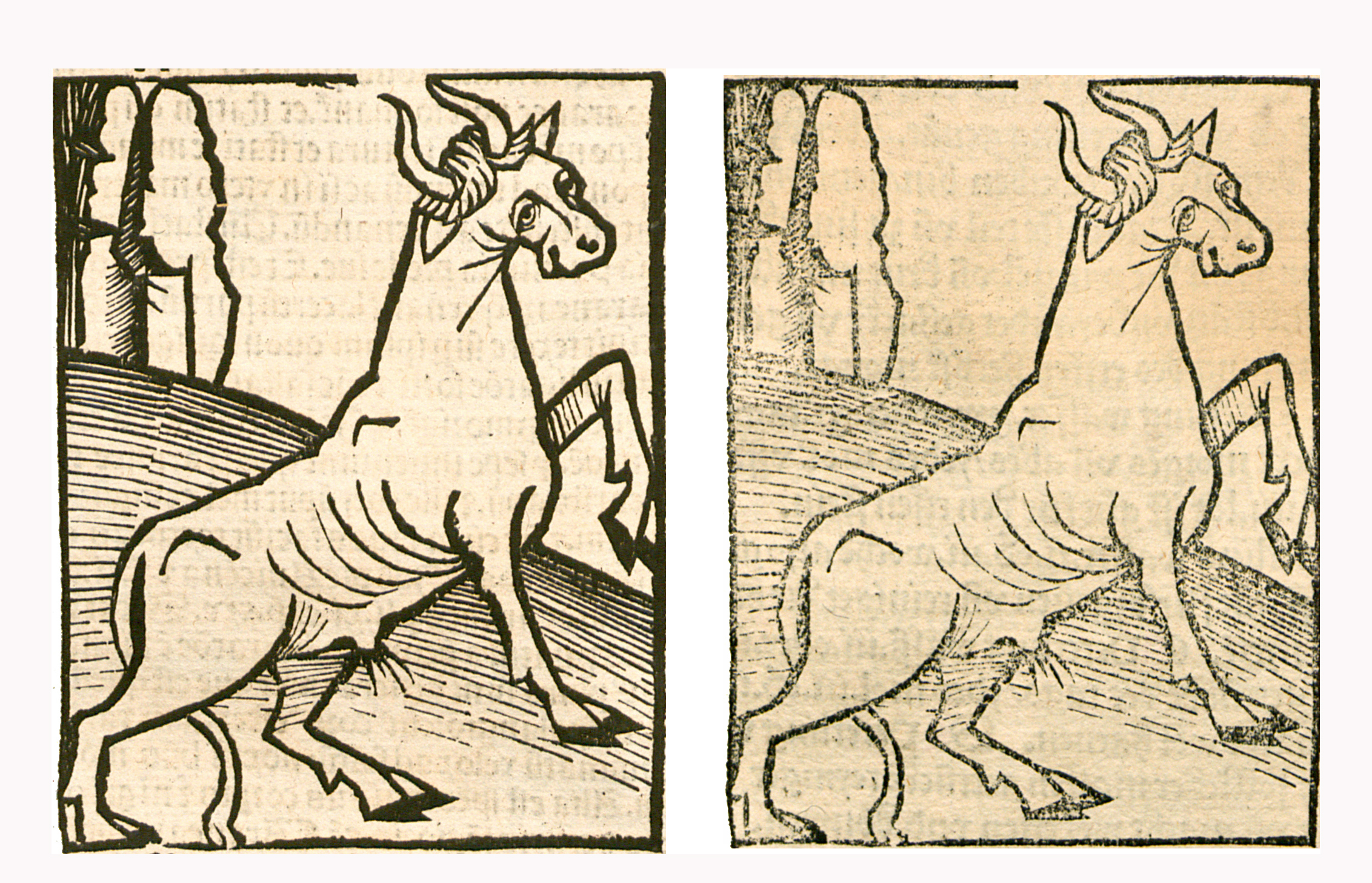
Bos primigenius taurus. Left: Hortus Sanitatis, Straßburg 1497 (II, 14). Right: Kleines Destillierbuch (Blatt 87r)

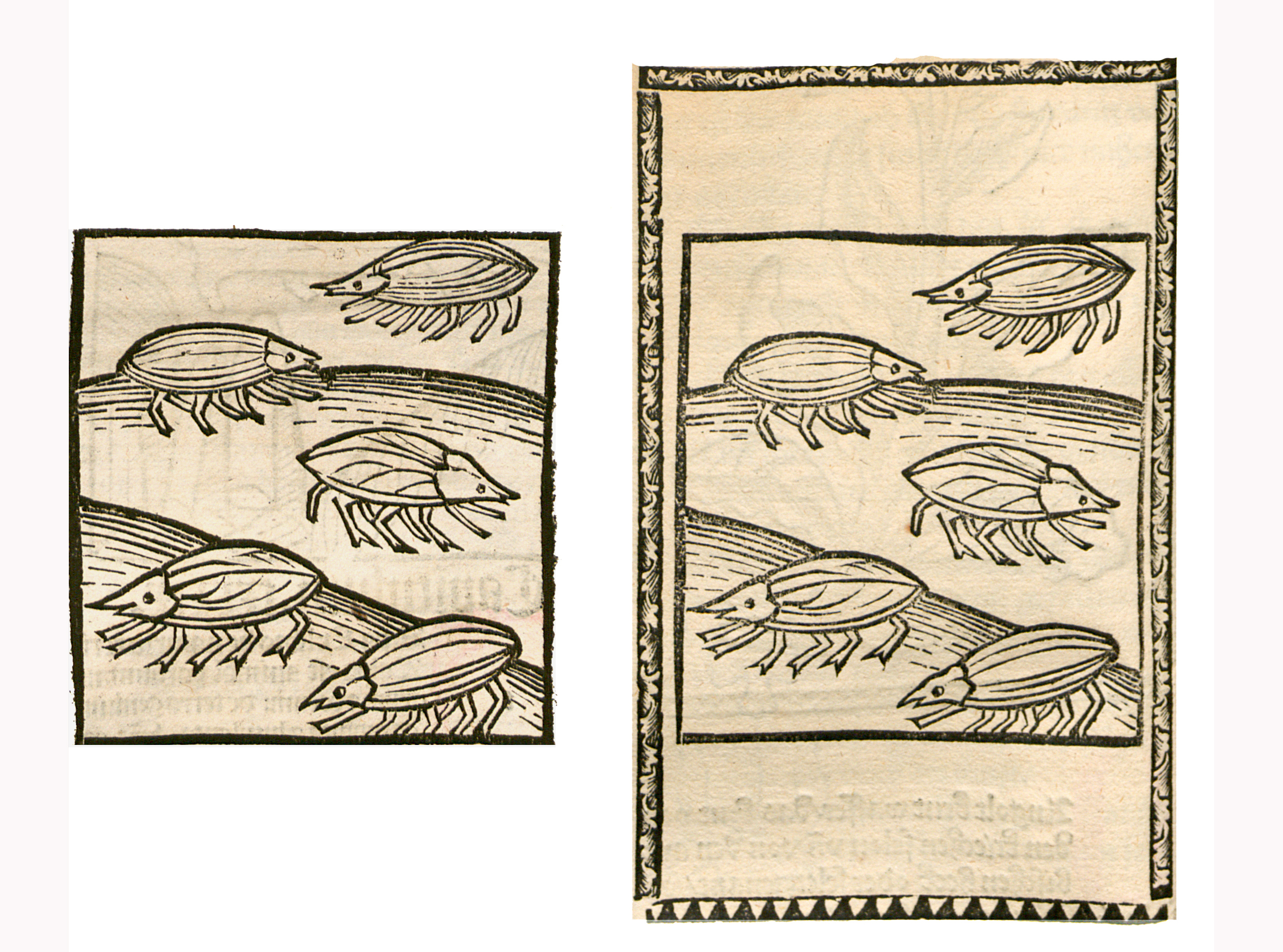
Meloe proscarabaeus. Left: Hortus Sanitatis, Straßburg 1497 (II, 134). Right: Kleines Destillierbuch (Blatt 80v)

=== Types of illustrations of plants using a new woodblock with a reversed copy ===
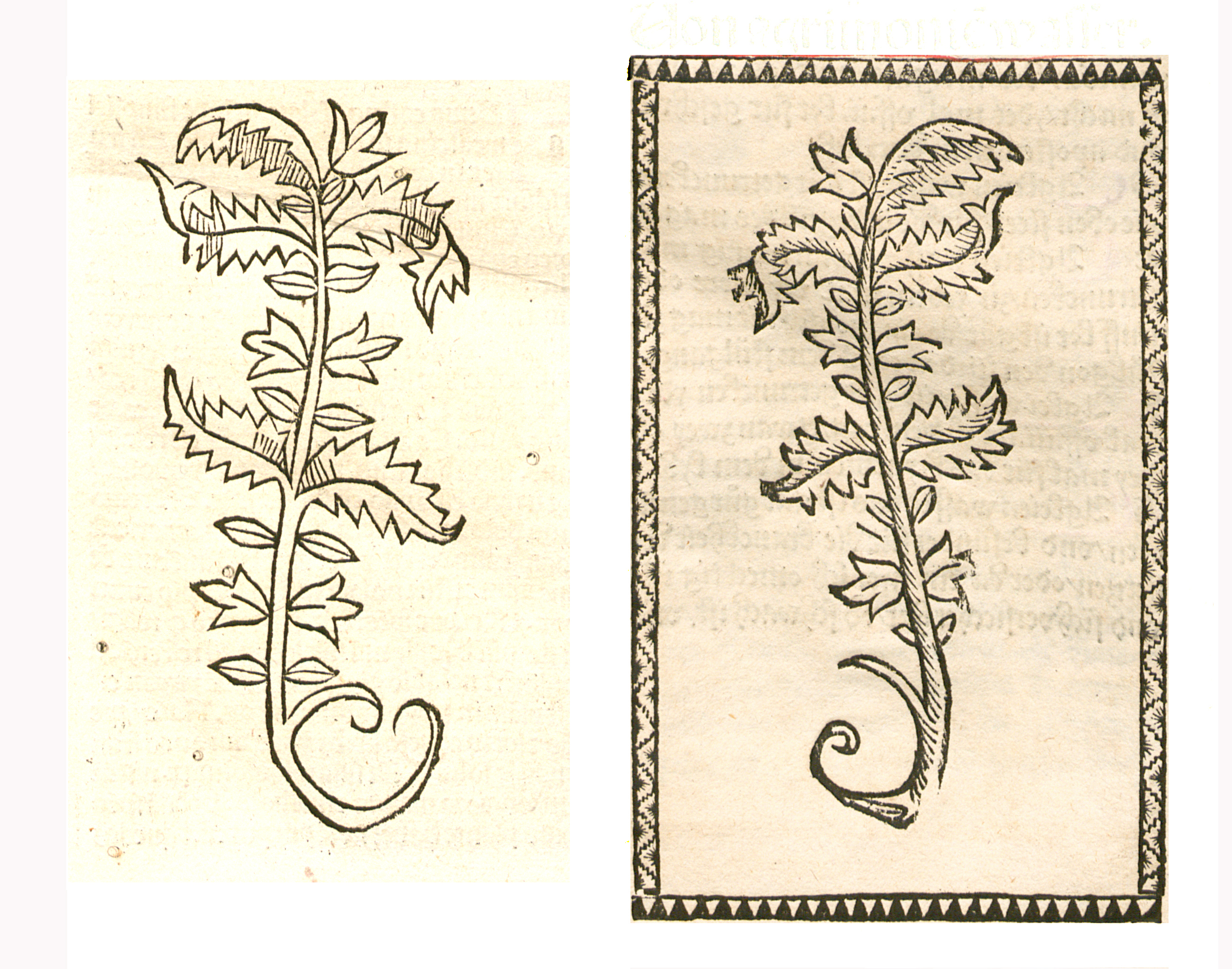
Agrimonia eupatoria. Left: Hort. Sanit., Straßburg 1497 (I, 9). Right: Reversed copy. Kleines Destillierbuch (Blatt 18r)

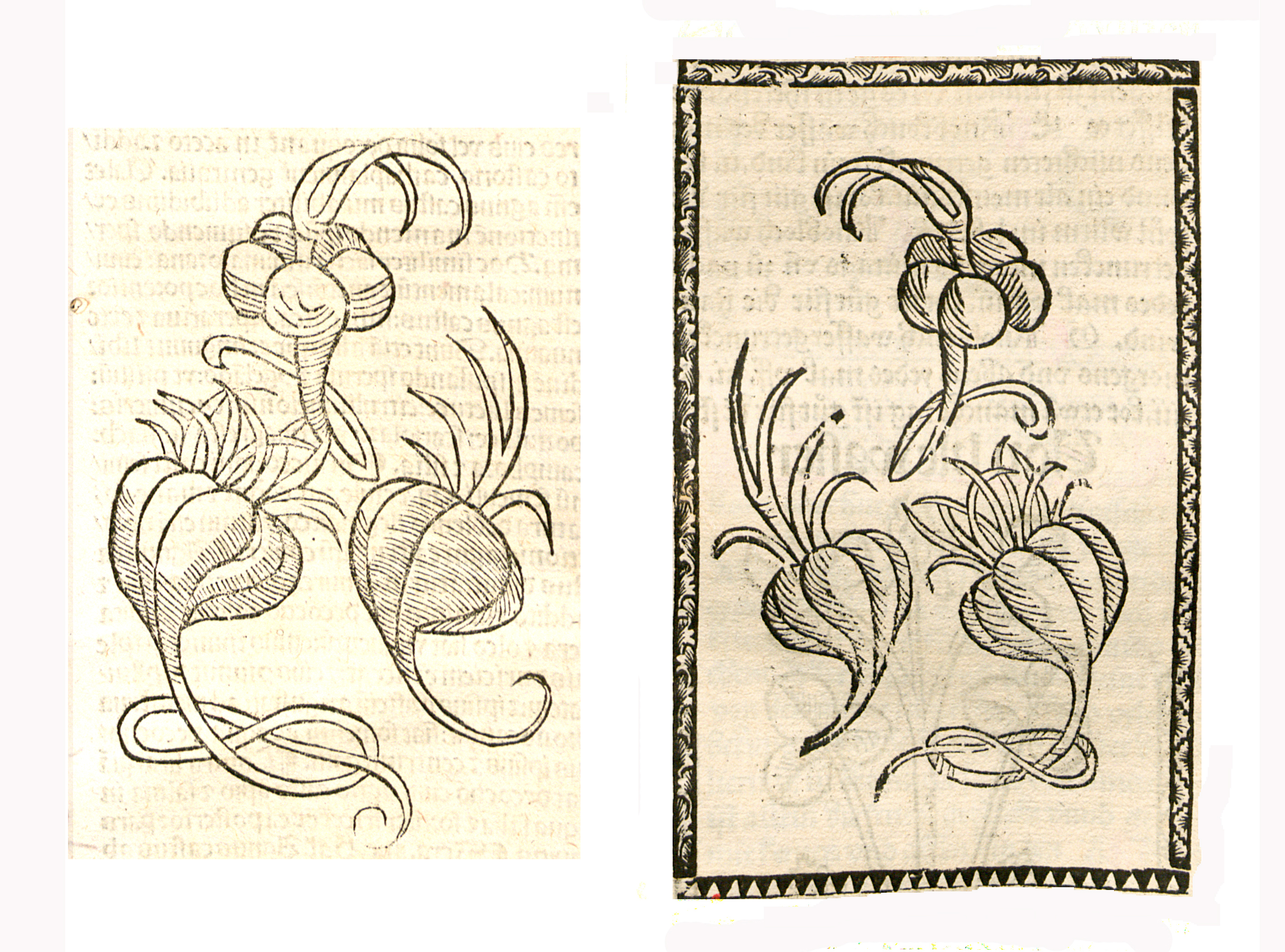
Allium sativum. Left: Hortus Sanitatis, Straßburg 1497 (I, 14). Right: Reversed copy. Kleines Destillierbuch (Blatt 65r)

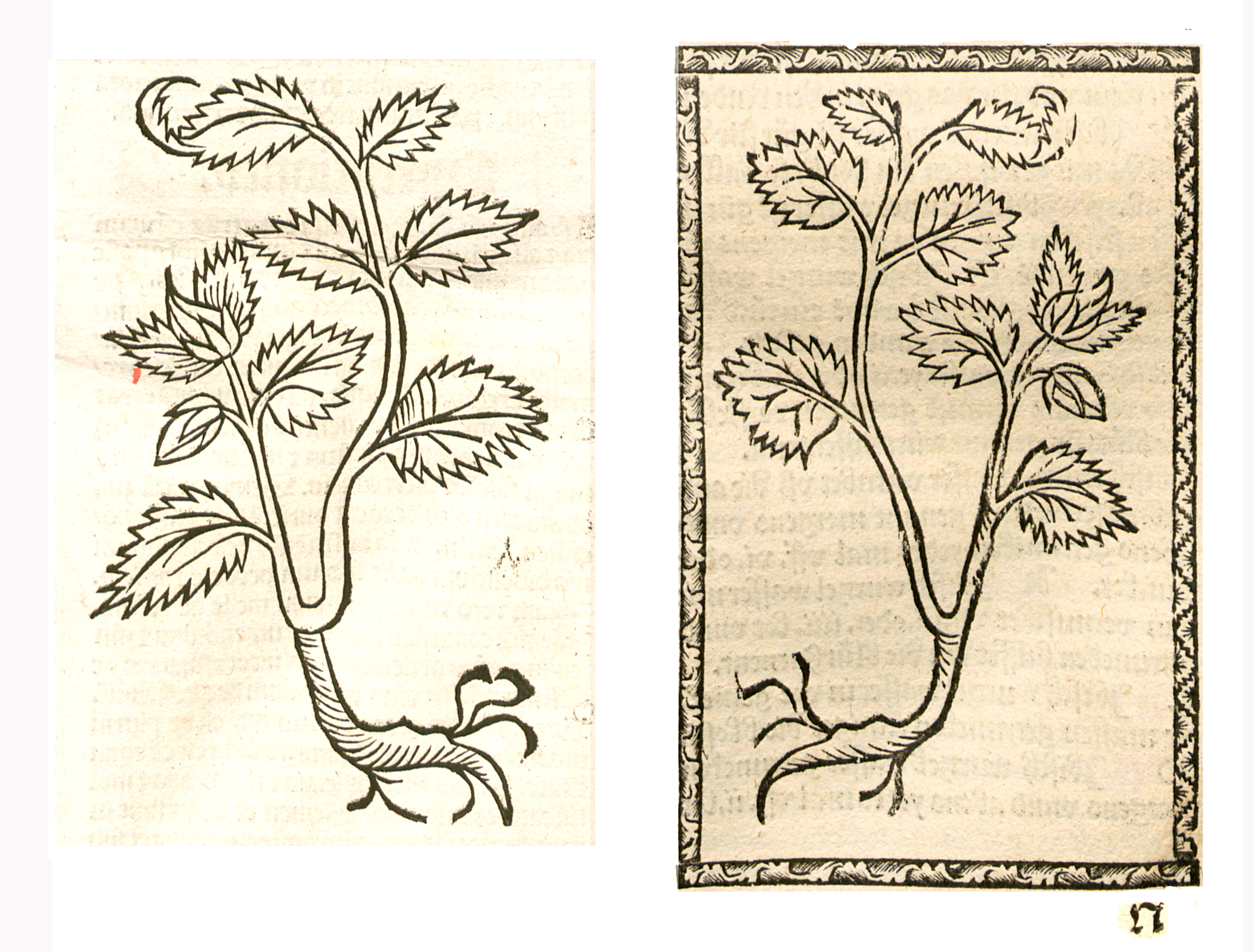
Althaea officinalis. Left: Hort. Sanitatis, Straßburg 1497 (I, 15). Right: Reversed copy. Kleines Destillierbuch (Blatt 63r)

=== Types of illustrations of plants using a woodblock, that shows a similar-looking plant ===
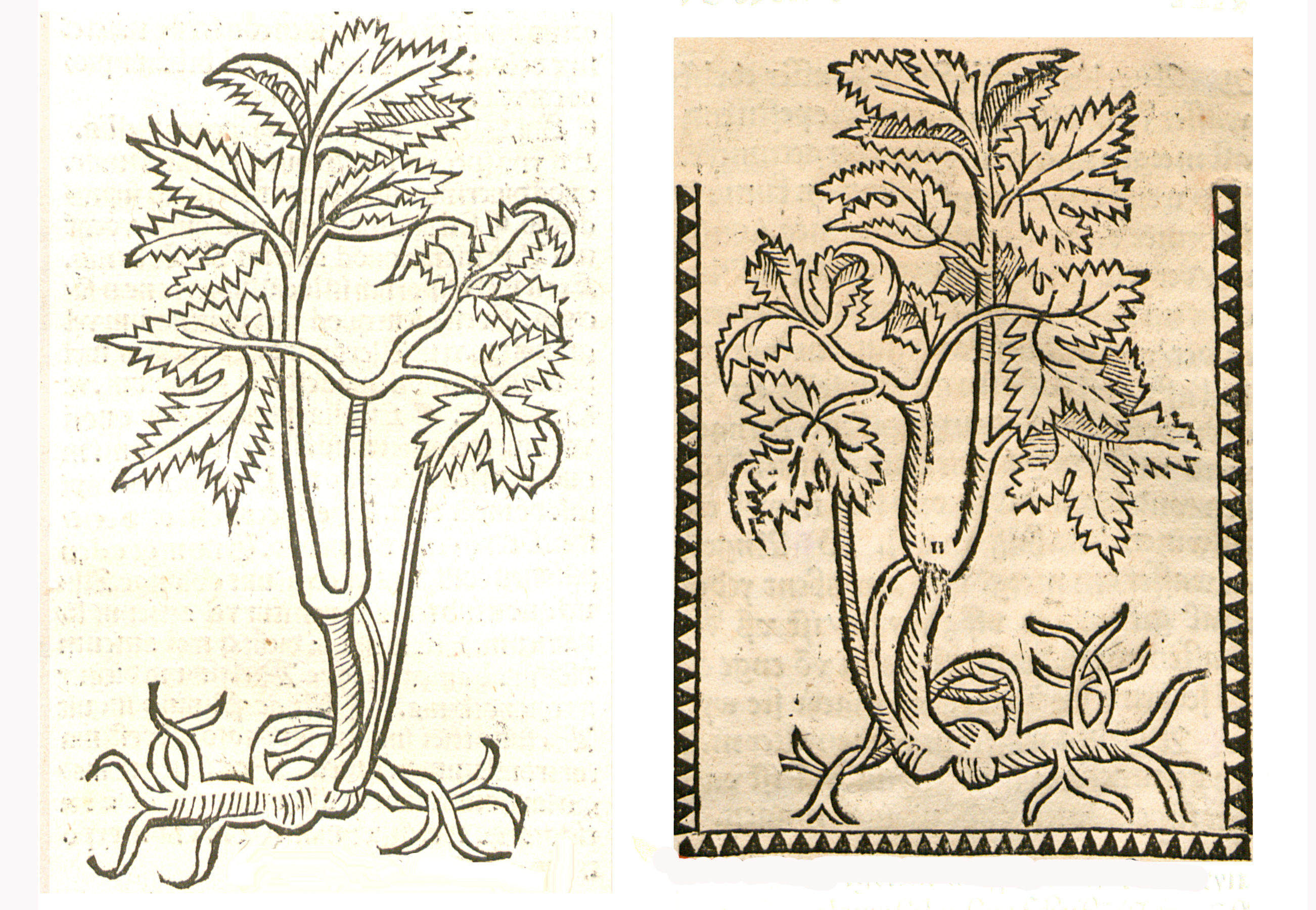
Illustration of Peucedanum ostruthium as a substitute for an illustration of Angelica archangelica. Left: Hortus Sanitatis, Straßburg 1497 (I, 291). Right: Kleines Destillierbuch (Blatt 20r)

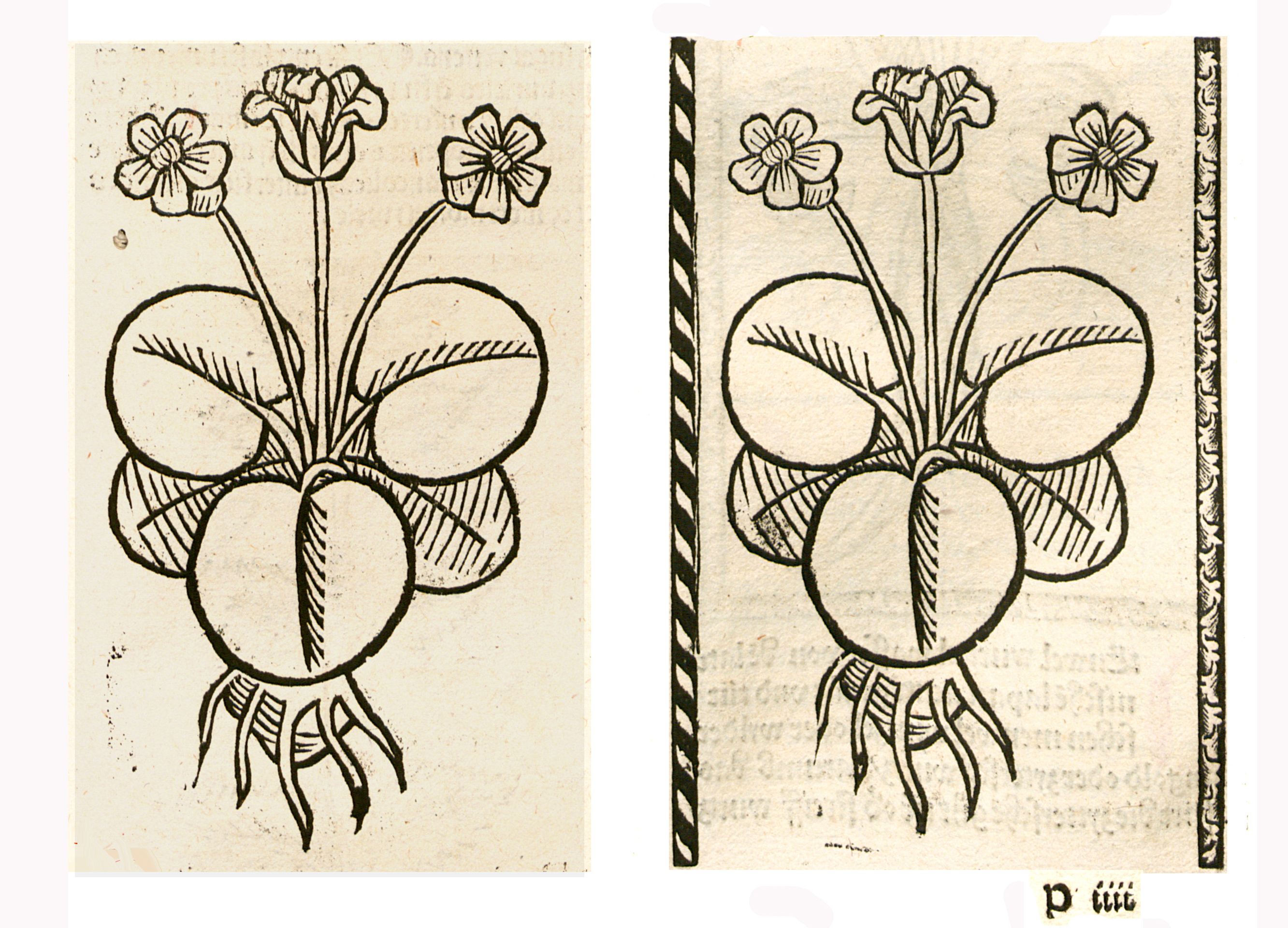
Illustration of Nuphar luteum as a substitute for an illustration of Caltha palustris: Left: Hortus Sanitatis, Straßburg 1497 (I, 309). Right: Kleines Destillierbuch (Blatt 78r)

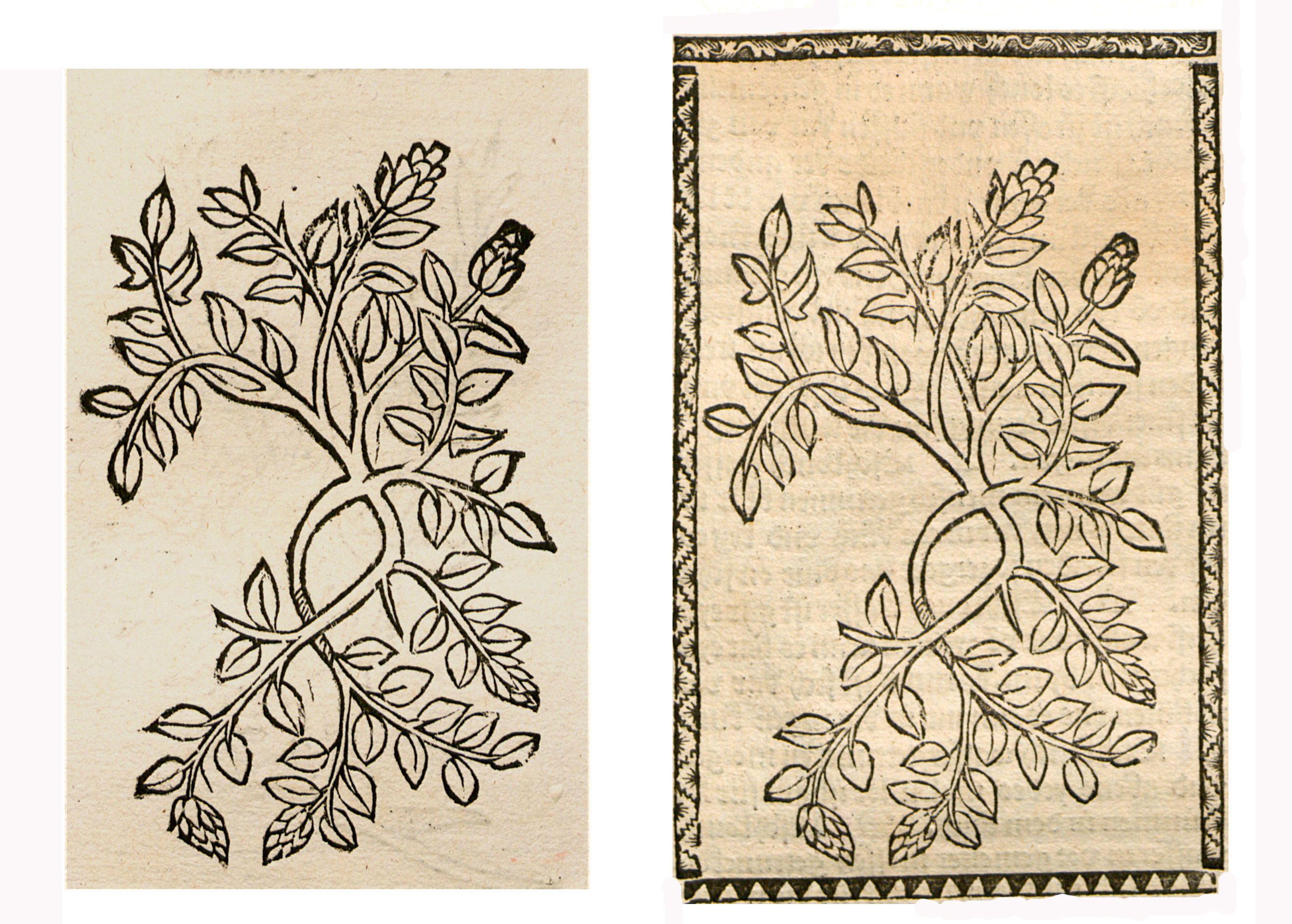
Illustration of Thymus serpyllum as a substitute for an illustration of Veronica officinalis. Left: Hortus Sanitatis, Straßburg 1497 (I, 429). Right: Kleines Destillierbuch (Blatt 43r)

== Impact ==
The Kleines Destillierbuch was extremely successful commercially and was published in 16 different editions from 1500 to 1568. It directly influenced the later works of Philipp Ulstad, Eucharius Rösslin, and Adam Lonicer.

The book's impact reached outside Germany, and it was one of the first works about the natural sciences that was translated into English. It was also the first book specifically on chemistry that was translated into English. It was translated into Dutch in 1517, into English in 1527, and into Czech in 1559.
