= Iatrochemistry =

Early modern branch of medicine

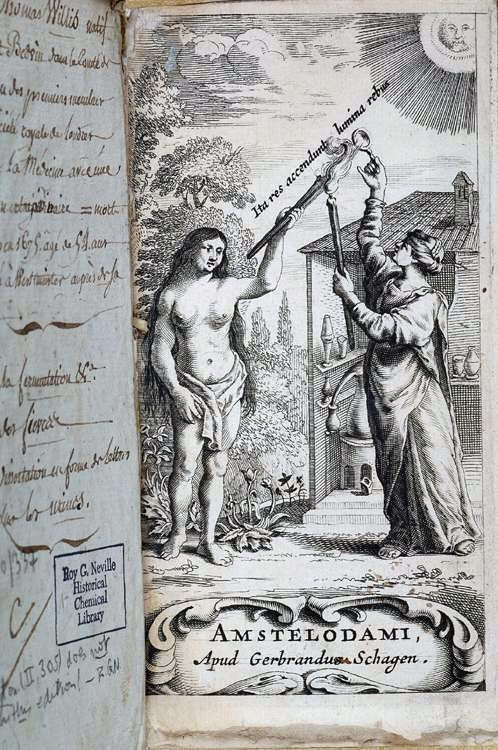
Frontispiece to Thomas Willis' 1663 book Diatribae duae medico-philosophicae - quarum prior agit de fermentatione, a treatise on fermentation as a mysterious key to transformations (from mash to beer or from health to fevers), engraved and published by Gerbrandus Schagen in Amsterdam

Iatrochemistry (from Ancient Greek ἰατρός (iatrós) 'physician, medicine'; also known as chemiatria or chemical medicine) is an archaic pre-scientific school of thought that was supplanted by modern chemistry and medicine. Having its roots in alchemy, iatrochemistry sought to provide chemical solutions to diseases and medical ailments.

This area of science fell out of use in Europe since the rise of modern establishment medicine. Iatrochemistry was popular between 1525 and 1660, especially in the Low Countries. Its most notable leader was Paracelsus, an important Swiss alchemist of the 16th century. Iatrochemists believed that physical health was dependent on a specific balance of bodily fluids. Iatrochemical therapies and concepts are still in wide use in South Asia, East Asia and amongst their diasporic communities worldwide.

== History in Europe ==
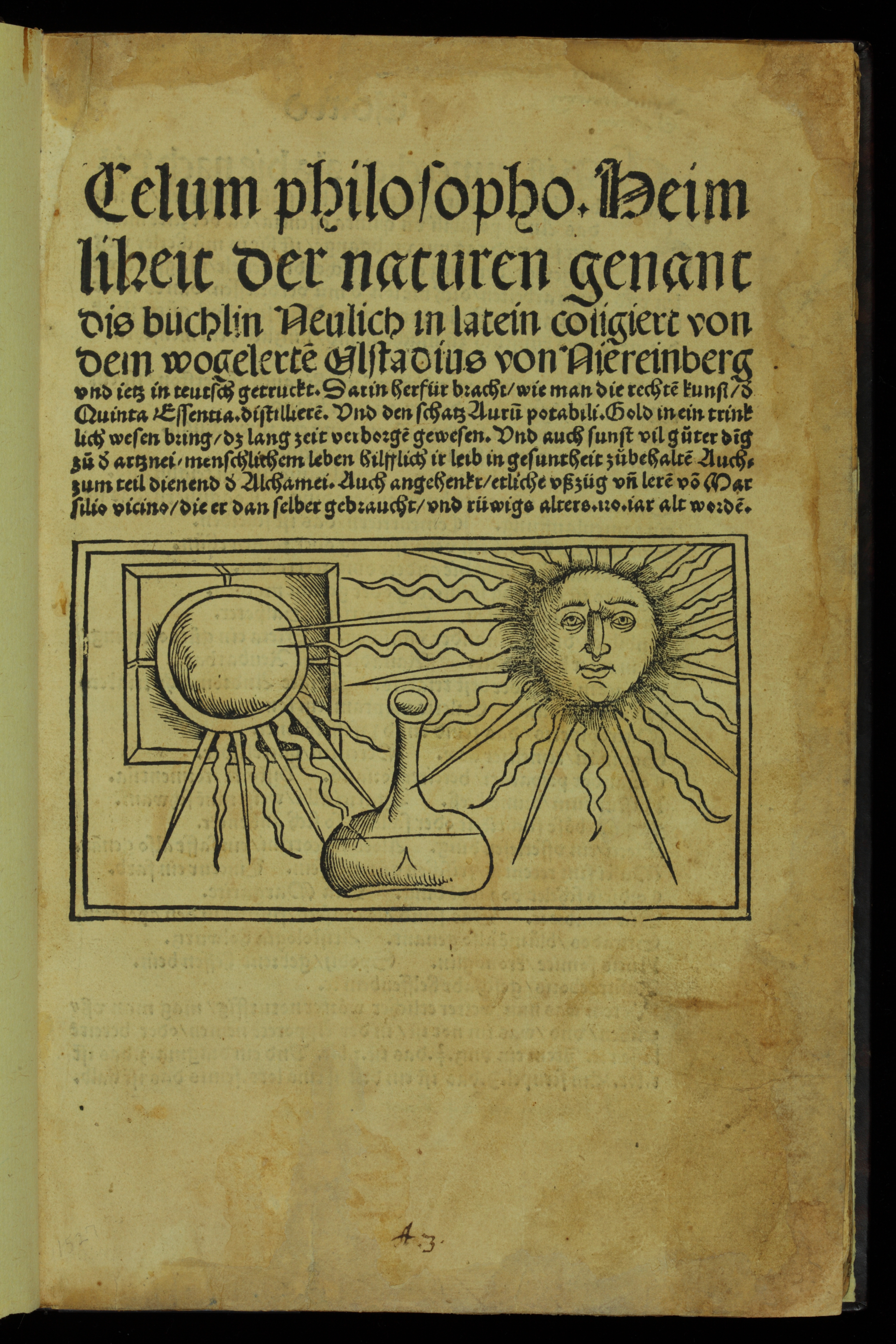
An image representing water distillation by means of the sun for creating aqua vitae, from Coelum philosophorum by Philippus Ulstadius, 1527

The preparation of medicines had become a part of alchemy by the early modern period. Around 1350, John of Rupescissa advocated the extraction of the "essence" of both plants and minerals. He often used two relatively new substances during this period: an alcohol distilled from wine and strong mineral acids. Later, "Pseudo-Llull" (i.e. the body of work attributed to, but not necessarily written by, Ramon Llull) picked up and helped in expanding John of Rupescissa's theory.

The most effective and vocal proponent of iatrochemistry was Theophrastus von Hohenheim, also known as Paracelsus (1493–1541). He put his effort into the transmutation of metals and emphasized iatrochemistry in his works. Paracelsus believed that diseases were caused by poisons, but that poisons were not entirely negative. He suggested that poisons, or diseases, could also be cured by poisons; thus, poisons could have beneficial medical effects. Paracelsus's claim led to many chemically prepared medicines in this period which contained toxic components: arsenic, antimony, mercury, lead, and other heavy metals. However, his views were not accepted by many scholars until his writings were organized into systematic form by his followers. Gradually, many physicians accepted Paracelsian remedies, although some disagreed with Paracelsus's philosophy.

Philipp Ulstad, who wrote some of the first books on chemical medicine, paved the way for a closer link between alchemy and medicine. His lucid, concise prose made Coelum philosophorum (1527) one of the most reissued chemical-medicine books of the 16th and 17th centuries. This documentation of knowledge was a trend that began in the mid-16th century and it allowed knowledge that was typically limited to those in apprenticeships to be accessible to anyone.

In 1609, Flemish chemist Jan Baptista van Helmont began a seven-year period of individual research, hoping to explore nature through chemistry, ultimately hoping to replace traditional learning. Van Helmont used chemical methods to study bodily products such as urine and blood. He studied the human body and its functions, and applied his knowledge of "chymistry" as a way of understanding and curing the body. Although he began as a follower of Paracelsus, van Helmont rejected many of his theories, most notably Galenic concept of the macrocosm with microcosm. In addition, van Helmont refused to accept the Paracelsian first principles (sulphur, salt, and mercury) as pre-existent in matter, believing instead that sulphur, salt and mercury were products of reactions that involved heat.

Much of van Helmont's medical philosophy was concerned with the activity of vital spirit in nature, which he believed originated from spiritual seeds planted in elementary water. To find the invisible seeds of bodies, van Helmont chemically studied the smoke from combusted solids and liquids. He called this substance "specific smoke" (i.e., that which contained the essence of its former material substance) and applied the term "gas." Van Helmont's work included defining operations of the body in chemical terms. He described the body's functions as the chemical reactions of effervescence, fermentation, and putrefaction as the basis of all physiology. Using the texts of Paracelsus and Quercetanus as a guide, he determined that acid was the digestive agent in the stomach, demonstrating a major chemical process within bodily function. He also offered new methods derived from Paracelsus for preparing chemical medicines, advancing in particular recipes involving mercury.

Van Helmont had a bias towards the unity of things. In examining body fluids, he postulated the notion of "latex", attempting to relate latex to secretions and thirst. This implied a common pool of fluid, participating in more than one of what the Galenists took to be distinct humours. His collected works were edited and published by his son under the title Ortus medicinae (1648). In it, Helmont shows that the Galenists are in confusion, supposing urine and sweat both to be separated blood serum, and serum itself to be the humour yellow bile, a fluid quite evidently different from it.

Van Helmont's writings had a widespread influence on 17th-century European medical theory, and by 1709, twelve editions of Ortus medicinae had been published in five languages. The diffusion of his medical ideas varied by region. In Italy the diffusion of Helmontian ideas was concentrated mainly in Venice, where two influential Helmontians lived: the German physician Otto Tachenius and the Maceratese Ludovico Conti. There is also evidence that Helmontian iatrochemistry was widely diffused in Naples, as attested in the works of two prominent physicians, Lucantonio Porzio and Lionardo di Capua.

In Germany, van Helmont's philosophy was already a matter of dispute by 1649, and despite censures, Helmontianism gained a large number of followers in Germany. In France, van Helmont's works were immediately perceived as a threat to classical medicine. Guy Patin, a strenuous opponent of chemistry and champion of Greek medicine, sharply attacked van Helmont, while J. Didier published a Refutation de la doctrine nouvelle du Sieur Helmont touchant es fievres at Sedan in 1653, and, four years later, Helmontian iatrochemistry was censured in a book published by the Paris physician Gabriel Fontaine.

Possibly being one of the most famous physicians of the 17th and 18th centuries, Herman Boerhaave (1668–1738) approached phenomena in medicine with a scientific process of observation and experiments. He is most famous for recreating the Andrea Vesalius book of human anatomy. Boerhaave featured human beings participating in daily activities but with a transparency to them so that their organs could be seen. His fascination with chemistry led him to model the human body in terms of its chemistry in the flows and interactions of the different phases including solids, liquids and gases. In his work, he narrowed down the causes of diseases to a substance called "acid humour", which would affect flow of blood causing unbalance and detrimental chemical reactions, eventually causing malfunctioning of the human body. In a different example, it is documented that Boerhaave observed a certain "medullary oil" existed inside of bones which was very important for creating the "heat and vital motion" disturbances that could lead to an ill state of the body. A certain accumulation of a fluid in these joints of the body would lead to disastrous stagnancy which would be characterized eventually by gangrenous or unhealthy tissue where this occurred. This medical state was coined as "imposthumation". Boerhaave is, perhaps, most well known in the realm of iatrochemistry for his discussions and understanding of the nervous system. Historians believe that Boerhaave's understanding of the human body and mechanisms in relation to the nervous and physical anatomy came from his personal interactions with soldiers in wars between the Dutch and Spanish. Through his understanding of the human body and chemistry he was able to develop a medicine for physical injuries. Boerhaave attributed fevers to the body's response to a stressful situation or shock, similar to the way that chemical reactions produce heat, in which the body encountered an unexpected onset of heat or freezing temperatures.

A German-born physician, Franciscus Sylvius (1614–1672), is best known in 18th-century European medicine for his contributions to the understanding of the biochemistry of the body and the tubercles, and as one of the co-founders of an iatrochemical school. In continuation of humoral medicine, Sylvius did deem that diseases resulted from excesses of the humors in the body, but he saw it as a more chemically driven excess, specifically one of too much acid or alkali solution in the body. Sylvius had his own laboratory in which he ran experiments on acids and alkali solutions to see the result when different mixtures were made. Much of his theories of the human body were based on the digestive processes. His understanding was that digestion helped food undergo a fermentation reaction. He reasoned that the body functioned mainly as a result of chemical reactions, of which acids and alkali were the essential reactants and were products which needed to be kept in balance to be in a healthy state. Although Sylvius did not take on the more observation-based style of medicine that was being so championed in the 17th and 18th centuries, his emphasis on the chemical reactions and knowledge helped support this more observation-driven scientific approach to medicine. It is known that many of Sylvius' inquiries did help in the future discoveries of certain enzymes driving food digestion and bodily reactions.

The understanding of iatrochemists helped to drive new knowledge of how drugs work and treat medical conditions. In particular, one English iatrochemist, Thomas Willis (1621–1675), considered the effect of diaphoretics (sweat-promoting drugs) as resulting from the mechanisms of the drug entering the blood and associating or disturbing blood and flow which produces a state of heat and sweat. He also hypothesized that the working of opiates came from an interaction with a salt in the body that created a painless and woozy feeling when it reached the brain. In his treatise De fermentalione (1659), Willis rejected the four Aristotelian elements of earth, air, fire and water, stating that they provided no special insight into "the more secret recesses of nature". Willis settled on a view on the organization of natural things based strictly on chemistry. Such a view, he wrote, "resolves all Bodies into Particles of Spirit, Sulphur, Salt, Water, and Earth ... Because this Hypothesis determinates Bodies into sensible parts, and cutts open things as it were to the life, it pleases us before the rest." Willis derived many of his conclusions from observations on distillation. It was eventually realized that these explanations were not accurate.

Natural philosopher Robert Boyle contributed greatly to the understanding of respiration by showing that air (or oxygen), which is required for fire in combustion reactions, is also needed for human breathing.^{[1]} Despite this, Boyle's works on the mechanical origin of qualities were generally rather remote from Helmontian chemistry; however, Boyle's philosophy and Helmontian iatrochemistry were not mutually exclusive. Like van Helmont, Boyle claimed that spirit of human blood, like other ingredients obtained by the chemical analysis of blood, was no simple substance.

=== Challenge to Galenic physiology ===
Iatrochemistry was a new practice in the 17th century, a time when traditional medicines were based on a legacy from the 4th and 5th centuries B.C. Much of this tradition was derived from Galen and Avicenna. The iatrochemists rejected the traditional medical theory, mostly from Galenic traditionalists. Galen traditionalists sought to establish the balance of temperament within the bodies. There are two pairs of qualities, hot and cold, and wet and dry. Sickness came from the imbalance of one quality. That is, a cold was an excess of heat (hot quality), so it can be cured by reducing hot quality or by increasing cold quality. The iatrochemists, influenced by Paracelsus's belief, believed that the sickness was from the outside source, not because of the imbalance of the body.

Another controversy between Galenic traditionalists and iatrochemists was the way to use herbs. The Galenic traditionalists thought that the strength of remedies relied on the amount of plant materials that was used. The iatrochemists, however, supported the chemical preparation of materials of remedies to increase the effectiveness of the materials or to find the stronger medicine.

Additionally, Galenic traditionalists argued that chemically prepared medicines were poisonous, and the iatrochemists were inadequately trained. The former was true, and, in some cases, both were correct. Since Paracelsus claimed that poisons could have beneficial medical effects, the number of toxic ingredients used in chemical medicines had increased. Galenic traditionalists later adapted medical method and some remedies to use in their own fields.

== History in South Asia ==
Iatrochemical principles form a major part of the Indian alchemical tradition (Sanskrit rasaśāstra, रसशास्त्र). Alchemical texts start to be composed in Sanskrit in South Asia from the end of the first millennium CE, and a flourishing literature developed and continued even into the twentieth century. These works contain extensive chapters on the use of alchemical recipes for healing.

The use of plants, minerals and metals in medical therapeutics also existed in India. In Ayurvedic medicine, substances used in these therapeutics were known as 'Rasa dravyas.' Ayurvedic medicine instills the belief that every material had the potential to be used as a substance. This drove the creation of new products and new uses for common substances in nature. The people of Ayurvedic medicine categorize the materials in nature into three categories: 'Janagama,' substances from animals such as milk, urine, blood, and meat, 'Audbhida' or substances from plants such as stems, roots or leaves, and 'Paarthiwa' or metal/mineral substances such as gold, silver, copper or sulfur. There was especially an emphasis on the element, Mercury, in this culture. The name of these specific practices in Ayurvedic medicine, were termed 'Rasashaastra', which means the "Science of Mercury". which has eventually become known as Iatrochemistry in current terminology. Much of the focus of 'Rasashaastra' was on the processing of these metals to become ingestible by the human body. The therapeutic effect of the materials such as metals and minerals that were known to be indigestible by the human body were combined with plants or animal materials to increase their delivery ability to human body.

== See also ==
- Antivenom
