= Claude Bourdelin =

French chemist; (1621?-1699)

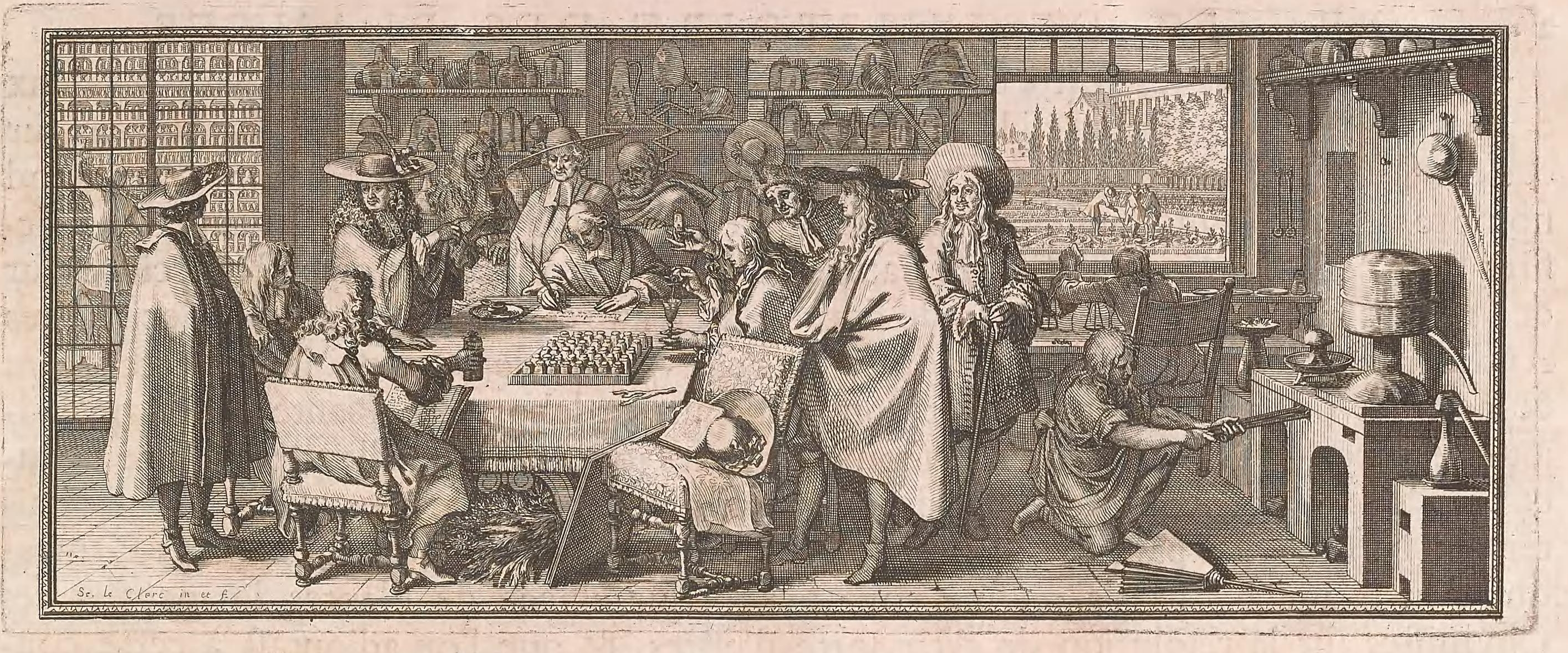
Engraving by Sebastian Le Clerc showing the members of the Royal Academy of Sciences, printed in Mémoires pour servir à l'histoire des plantes (1676). The man on the right, in profile view, pouring liquid from a bottle into a glass has been identified as a depiction of Bourdelin. Du Clos is seen seated at the left and in front of the table, showing only his back.

Claude Bourdelin (French pronunciation: [klod buʁdəlɛ̃]; c. 1621 – 14 October 1699) was a French apothecary and a pioneer of iatrochemistry. He was among the first chemists, along with Samuel Cottereau du Clos, to serve in the French Academy of Sciences at the time of its founding in 1666, chosen by Jean-Baptiste Colbert on behalf of Louis XIV.

Bourdelin was born in Villefranche, Lyonnais. His parents died when he was young after which he was raised by relatives in Paris. He taught himself Greek and Latin and became an assistant to the apothecary serving Gaston, Duke of Orléans. He then became an assistant of Philippe d'Orléans who served the Duke of Anjou. When the French Academy of Sciences was founded in 1666, Jean-Baptiste Colbert was assigned by Louis XIV to select members and he appointed Samuel Cottereau du Clos and Claude Bourdelin who were both associated with medicine. From 1667 Claude Perrault suggested a research program which included chemical studies. Bourdelin worked with Samuel Cottereau du Clos to analyze mineral waters (sampling ninety sources from 68 locations in France and the analysis was published in 1675), materials from plants and animals. The academy consisting of fifteen members would meet twice a week, Tuesdays for mathematics and Saturdays for physics. The examination of plant matter included distillation of liquids and attempts to separate mixtures and compounds.
