= Aqua vitae =

Concentrated aqueous solution of ethanol

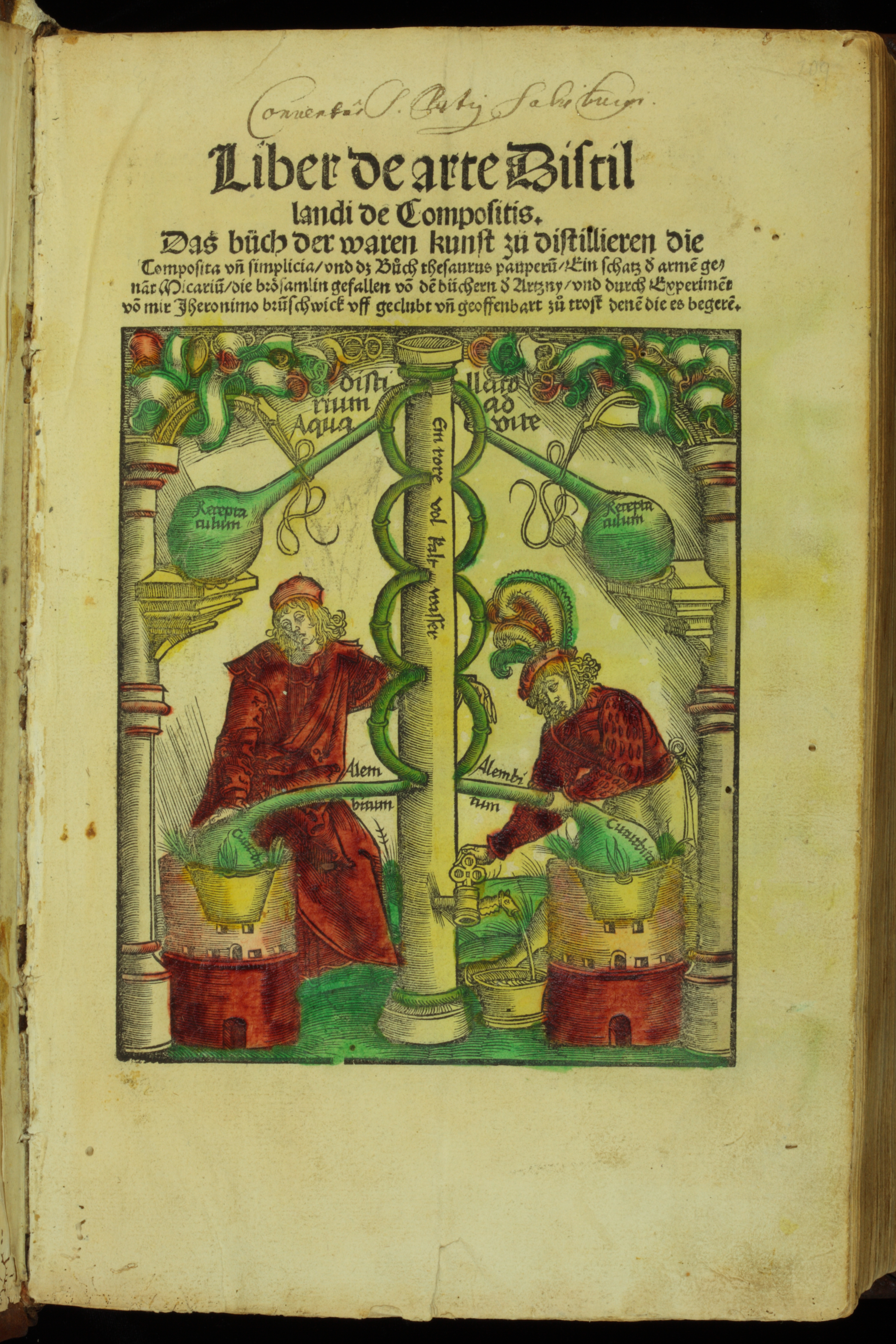
Distillation apparatus for aqua vitae from Hieronymus Brunschwig, Liber de arte Distillandi (1512)

Aqua vitae /ˌækwə ˈviːteɪ/ (Latin for "water of life") or aqua vita is an archaic name for a strong aqueous solution of ethanol. These terms could also be applied to weak ethanol without rectification. Usage was widespread during the Middle Ages and the Renaissance, although its origin is likely much earlier. This Latin term appears in a wide array of dialectical forms throughout all lands and among all peoples conquered by ancient Rome. The term is a generic name for all types of distillates, and eventually came to refer specifically to distillates of alcoholic beverages (liquors).

Aqua vitae was typically prepared by distilling wine and in English texts was also called ardent spirits, spirit of wine, or spirits of wine, a name that could be applied to brandy that had been repeatedly distilled.

The term was used by the 14th-century alchemist John of Rupescissa, who believed the then newly discovered substance of ethanol was an imperishable and life-giving "fifth essence" or quintessence, and who extensively studied its medical properties.

Aqua vitae was often an etymological source of terms applied to important locally produced distilled spirits. Examples include whiskey (from the Irish uisce beatha), eau de vie in France, acquavite in Italy, akvavit and akkevit in Scandinavia, okowita in Poland, оковита (okovyta) in Ukraine, акавіта (akavita) in Belarus, and яковита (yakovita) in southern Russian dialects.

== See also ==
- Alchemy
- History of ethanol
- Vodka
