= Uisce beatha =

Name for whiskey in Irish

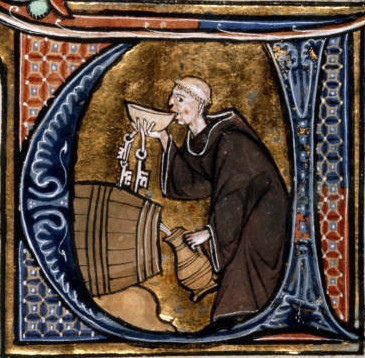
Image of a monk drinking alcohol from 'Li Livres dou Santé (“The Book of Health”), c 1285

Uisce beatha (Irish pronunciation: [ˈɪʃcə ˈbʲahə]), literally "water of life", is the name for whiskey in Irish. It is derived from the Old Irish uisce ("water") and bethu ("life"). The Scottish equivalent is rendered uisge beatha. Early forms of the word in English included uskebeaghe (1581), usquebaugh (1610), usquebath (1621), and usquebae (1715). The word "whiskey" (as spelt in Ireland and the United States) or "whisky" (the typical spelling in the rest of the world) is simply an anglicized version of this phrase, stemming from a mispronunciation of either uisce in Ireland or uisge in Scotland. According to the Whiskey Museum in Dublin, the different spelling began as a marketing decision which started a trend soon followed by other companies; the extra "e" was regardless a late addition, and does not appear in the 1879 book The Truths About Whisky, which was published by the four biggest Dublin distillers. This development may in turn have influenced the modern Irish word fuisce ("whiskey"). The phrase uisce beatha was the name given to distilled alcohol by Irish monks of the Early Middle Ages, and is simply a translation of the Latin phrase aqua vitae.
