= Hieronymus Brunschwig =

German surgeon, alchemist and botanist

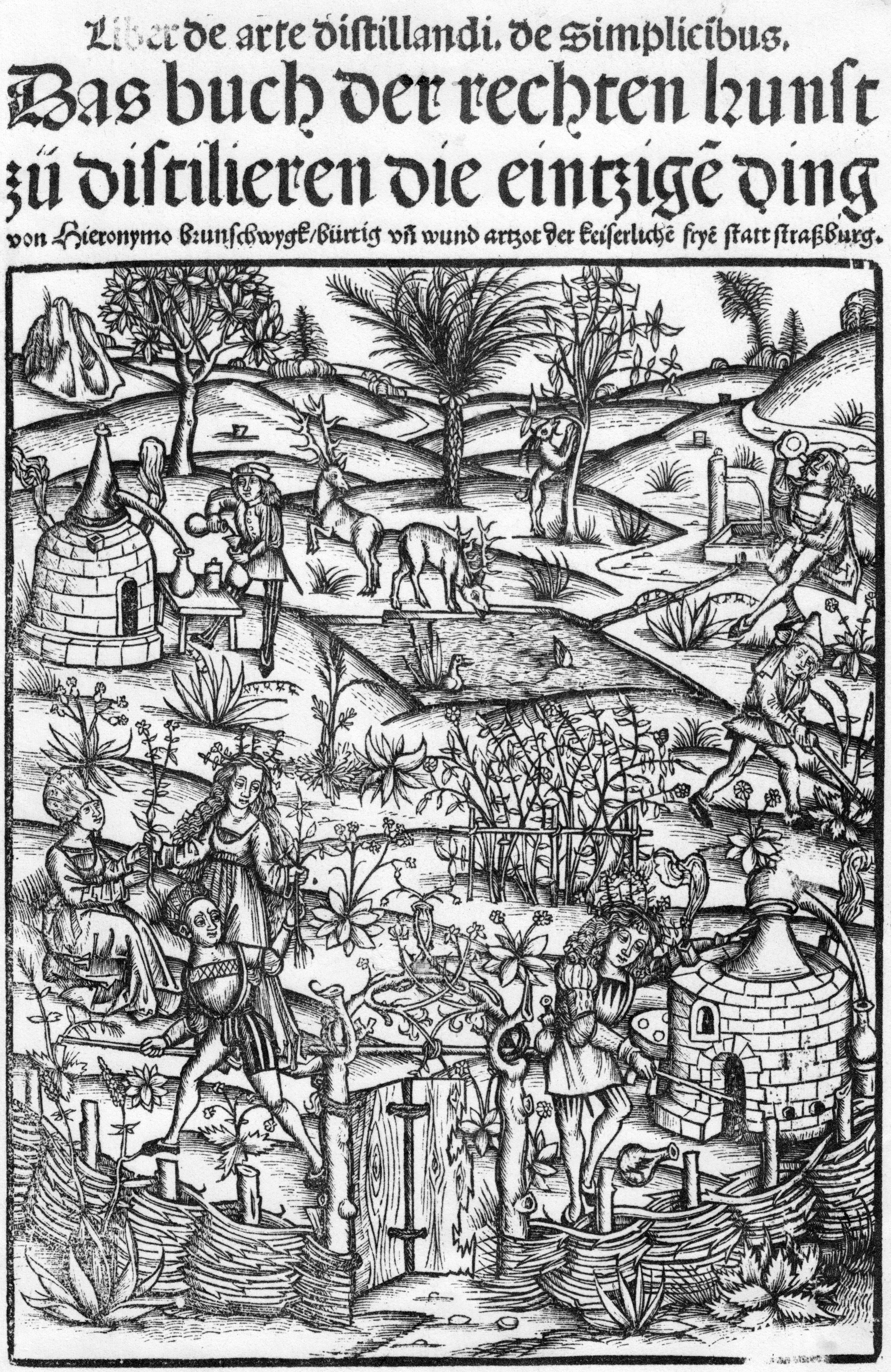
- the title page of Brunschwig's famous work, Liber de arte distillandi de simplicibus.
- Born: c. 1450; Strasbourg
- Died: c. 1512; Strasbourg
- Known for: Liber de arte distillandi de simplicibus

Hieronymus Brunschwig or Hieronymus Brunschwygk (c. 1450 – c. 1512) was a German surgeon ("Wundarzt"), alchemist and botanist. Around 1500, he published several works in German, including a plague treatise and two books on pharmaceutical distillation, aimed at non-academic practitioners. He was notable for his methods of treatment of gunshot wounds and for his early work on distillation techniques. His most influential book was the Liber de arte distillandi de simplicibus (also called Kleines Destillierbuch). These distillation books helped establish the genre of Destillierbücher, which became popular during the sixteenth century, especially among non-academic readers. He was also the author of the Buch der Cirurgia (1497), the first printed surgical treatise in German, which compiled ancient and medieval medical knowledge and included some of the earliest detailed discussions of gunshot wounds, fractures, dislocations, and surgical treatments.

== Life ==
Brunschwig was born c. 1450 in the free imperial city of Strasbourg, which in his time was part of the Holy Roman Empire and an important center for printing and scientific study. He was trained as a craftsman in the guild of barbers and bathers and understood medicine (arznei) primarily as a practical craft (kunst or handwerk), grounded in manual skill and experience. Some notes in his Buch der Cirurgia may suggest that he studied in Bologna, Padua and Paris and that he participated in the Burgundian Wars, but all this is unfounded. Archival evidence records him among barbers drafted for military service in the Burgundy campaigns in the 1470s. After training as a surgeon, he traveled widely through regions such as Alsace, Swabia, Bavaria, Franconia, and the Rhineland as far as Cologne. At these places, he practiced surgery and learned pharmaceutical techniques, especially the distillation of medicinal substances. He also drew on a wide range of medical and alchemical texts, adapting this knowledge into practical applications for the workshop and bedside. He settled at Strasbourg at the end of the fifteenth century, where he worked primarily as a surgeon serving local practitioners. He died in Strasbourg, c. 1512.

== Publications ==
- 1497: Das Buch der Cirurgia: Hantwirckung der Wundarztny.
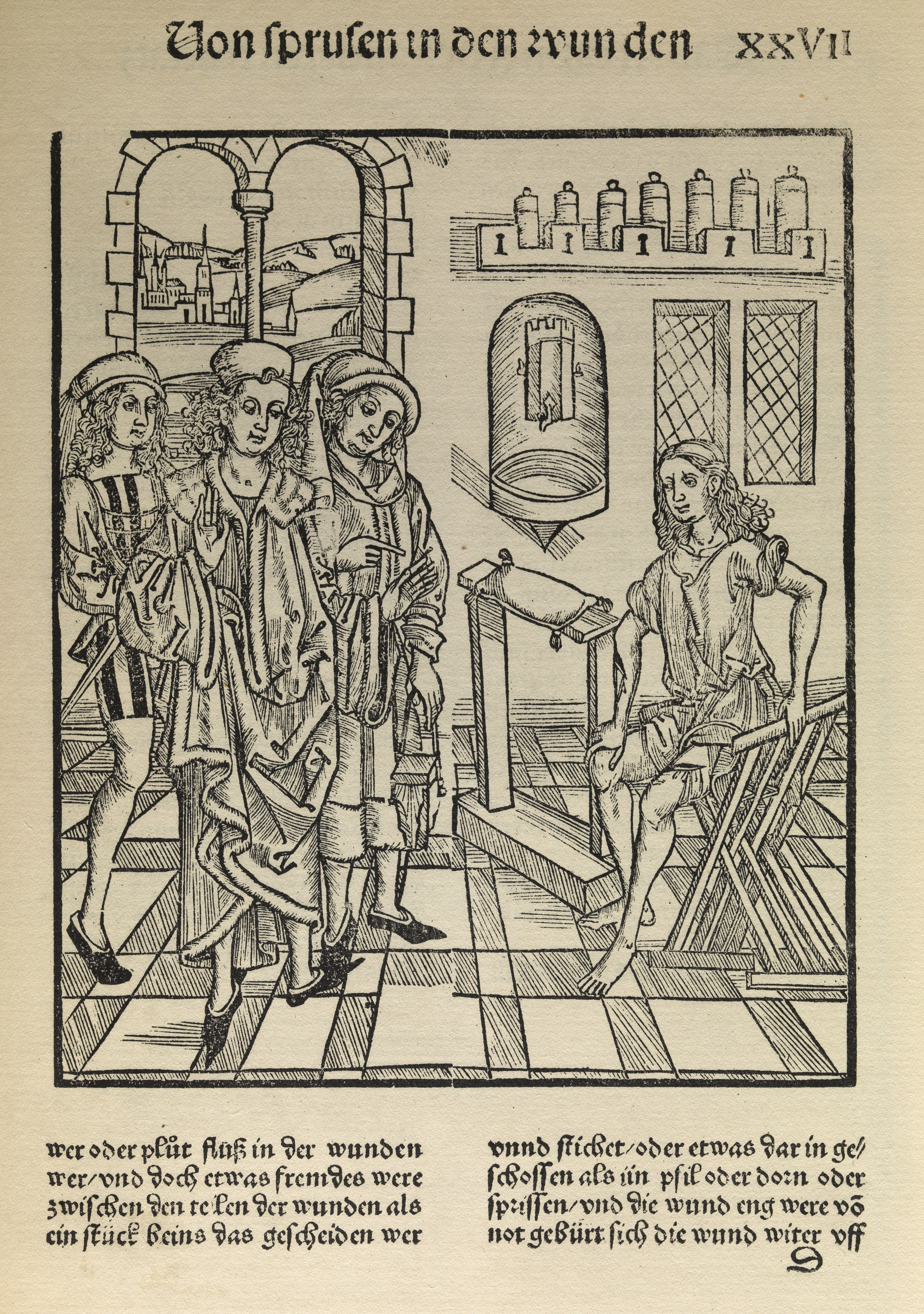
  Patient Examined by Surgeons from Das Buch der Cirurgia

Reprints: Strasbourg 1513 - Rostock 1518 in Low German - Augsburg 1534 - Munich 1911, 1968 - Milan - 1923.
Translations: 1) In English by Peter Treveris in London. 1525. 2) In Dutch by Jan Berents in Utrecht. 1535.

- 1500 (08.05.): Liber de arte distillandi de simplicibus. (= Kleines Destillierbuch)

Reprints of the Liber de arte distillandi de simplicibus were contained in the reprints of Medicinarius (see below) starting from 1505. Moreover the Liber de arte distillandi de simplicibus was merged with the Gart der Gesundheit (Mainz 1485) into the Kräuterbuch von allem Erdgewächs of Eucharius Rösslin the Younger. (Frankfurt 1533, 1535, 1536, 1538, 1540, 1542 and 1546).
Translations: 1) In Dutch by Thomas van der Noot in Brussels. 1517. 2) In English by Lawrence Andrew in London 1527. 3) In Czech by Jan Günther in Olmütz. 1559.

- 1500 (19.08.): Liber pestilentialis de venenis epidemie.: It was an illustrated work of approximately seventy pages analyzing how medical practitioners and ordinary citizens could navigate epidemics such as the plague.
- 1505: Medicinarius: Containing:
  - The Liber de arte distillandi de simplicibus. (Kleines Destillierbuch),
  - The treatise De vita libri tres of Marsilio Ficino (translated into German by Johann Adelphi of Strasbourg),
  - Glossaries of drugs names,
  - A treatise called De Quinta essentia which was largely influenced by the book De consideratione quintae essentiae of Jean de Roquetaillade.
  Reprints: Strasbourg 1508, 1515, 1521, 1528, 1531, 1537; Frankfurt 1551, 1554, 1555, 1560, 1610, 161
- 1512: Liber de arte distillandi de compositis. (= Großes Destillierbuch):

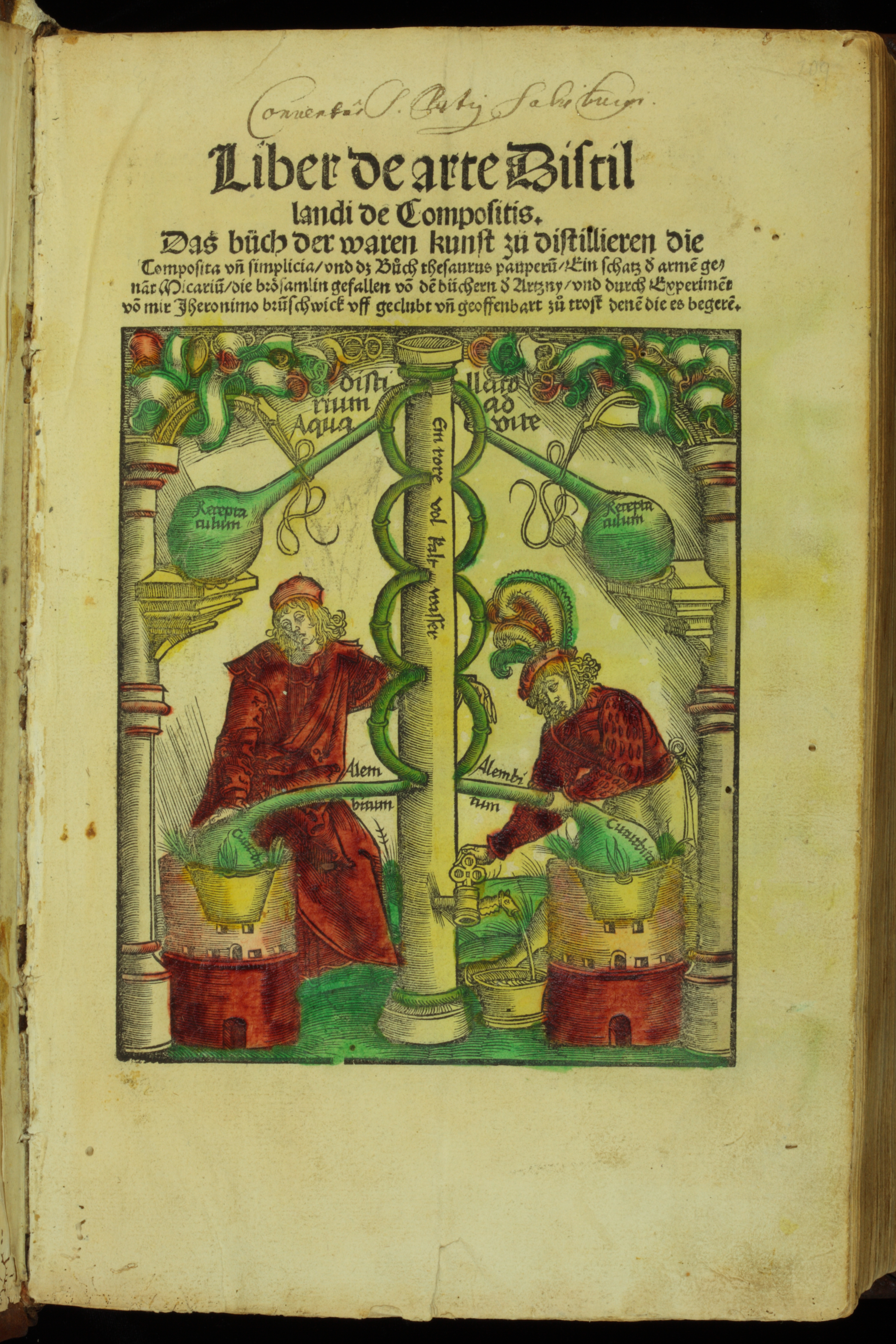
Hieronymus Brunschwig's Liber de arte Distillandi de Compositis (Strassburg, 1512)

Containing :
- A book about «Quinta essentia» and other alchemical drugs – with long passages taken out of the book De consideratione quintae essentiae of Jean de Roquetaillade,
- An enumeration of simplicia (medicines, composed by one single drug) and composita (medicines, composed by several drugs) – according to the character of diseases,
- An enumeration of simplicia and composita – according to the location of diseases (from head to feet),
- An enumeration of simplicia and composita – for use in surgical practice and
- A treatise intitled «Thesaurus pauperum» - dispensatory in 45 chapters, containing cheap medicines for the poor. The «Thesaurus pauperum» was separately reprinted: 1) under the titles Hausapotheke or Hausarzneibüchlein. (39 reprints. 1537 -1658). 2) under the title Apotheke für den gemeinen Mann together with the Büchlein von den ausgebrannten Wässern, which was ascribed to Michael Puff. (30 reprints. 1529-1619).

Reprints of the whole Liber de arte distillandi de compositis: Strasbourg 1519, 1532; Frankfurt 1538, 1551, 1552, 1597; Leipzig 1972.

== Buch der Cirurgia ==
Hieronymus Brunschwig's Buch der Cirurgia, was first published in 1497 in Strasbourg by Johannes Grüninger, and was the first printed surgical treatise in the German language, representing a major milestone in the development of surgical literature in Germany. At a time when surgery in Germany lagged behind that of France and Italy, this work demonstrated that German surgeons were not isolated form broader European medical traditions. In fact, Brunschwig was one of the first German surgeons to make extensive use of French and Italian sources, thereby helping to transmit their advances to a wider German-speaking audience.

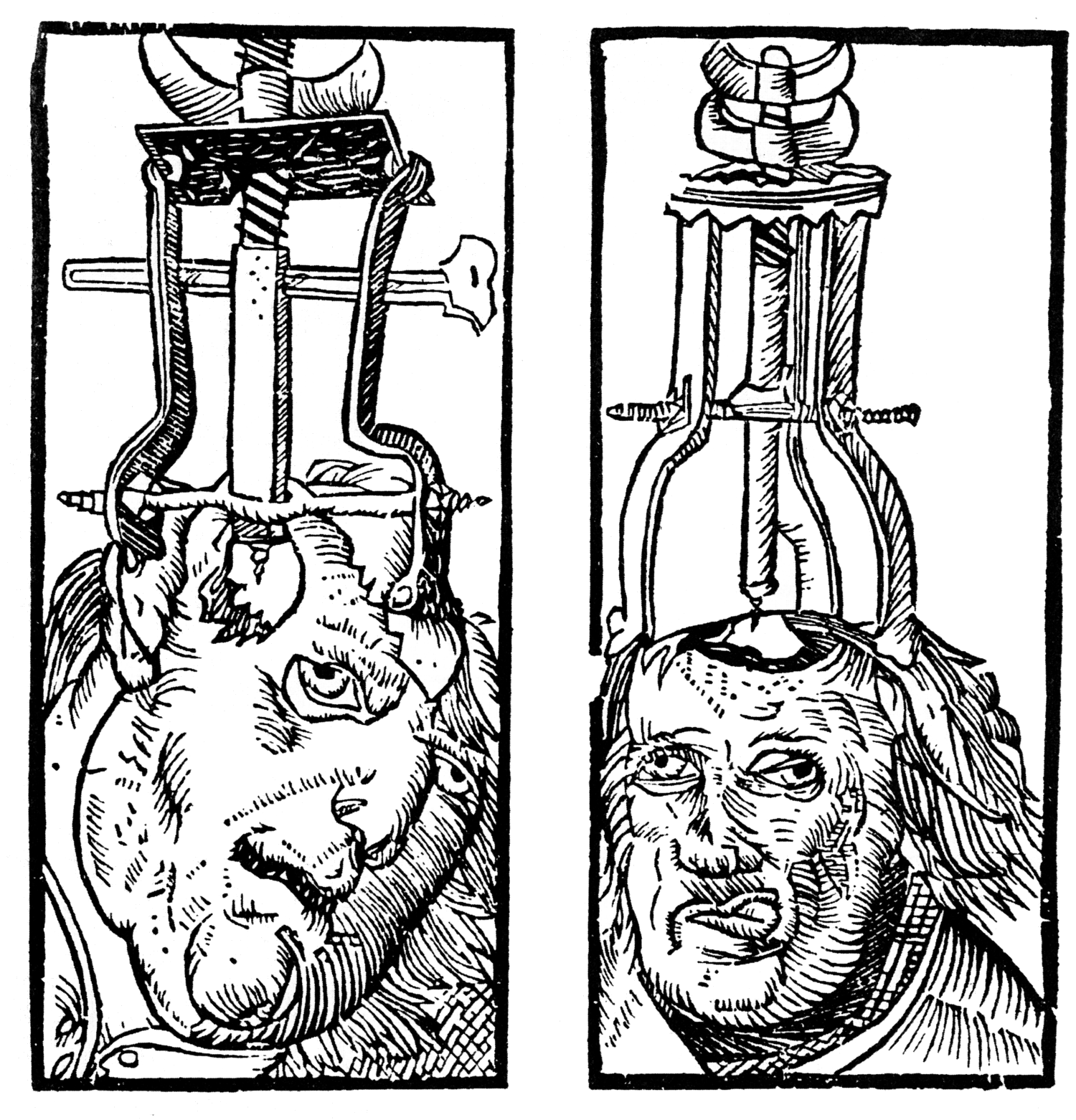
Trephining

The Cirurgia was written for the unspecialized or general surgeon and was primarily a compilation of knowledge derived from classical, Arabic, medieval, and contemporary sources, combined with Brunschwig's own practical experience. The purpose of this work was to teach the art of surgery (chirurgia) to those seeking to learn it. The handbook is comprehensive, covering all aspects of general surgery, with particular attention given to gunshot wounds, and fractures. It includes detailed discussions of gunshot wounds, arrow injuries, amputations, cranial procedures such as trepanation, and the treatments of dislocations and fractures.

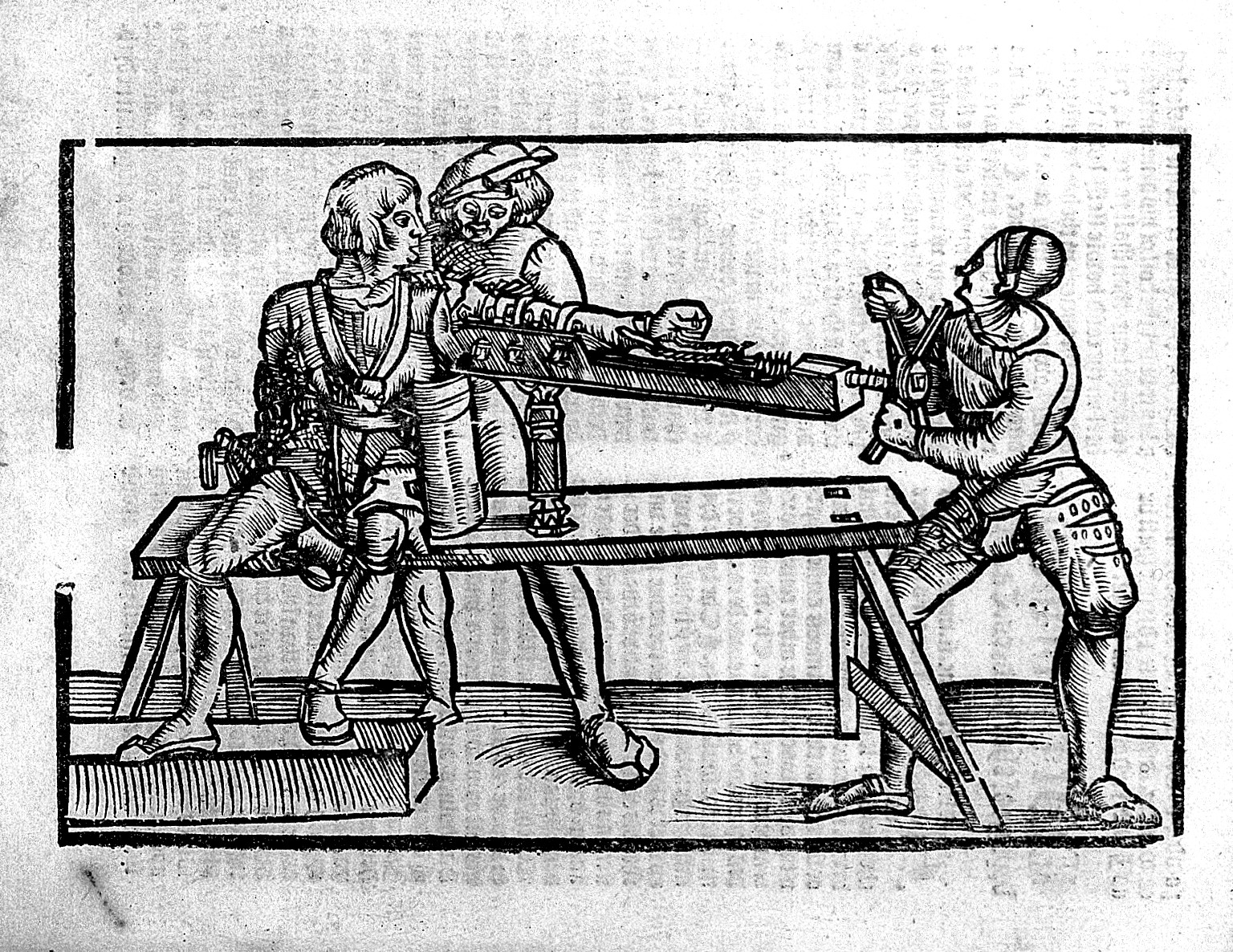
Device for dislocated shoulders

The handbook is divided to multiple treatises that address the role of the surgeon, the nature and causes of wounds, methods of treatment arranged from head to foot, accidental and deliberate injuries, and the management and reduction of fractures. The final part consists of an antidotarium, a collection of medicinal remedies like ointments and plasters used in surgical care.

It also includes notable illustrations, including numerous woodcuts depicting surgeons treating patients and demonstrating procedures. They are not always scientifically precise, but these images served an educational function, often portraying the surgeon as a teacher instructing students. The book also includes multiple depictions of surgical instruments, such as pincers for removing arrowheads or bullets, trephining tools for cranial surgery, bone saws for amputation, and other instruments like syringes, knives, cauteries, and needles. This also provided insight into the technology of late fifteenth-century surgery.

Unlike most contemporary medical texts, the Cirurgia was written in German rather than Latin, making it more accessible to practicing surgeons. Its popularity is reflected in its multiple editions (1497, 1513, 1534, 1539) and numerous translation, including English (London, 1525), Dutch (Utrecht, 1535), and Czech (Olomouc, 1559). The use of the printing press allowed the work to circulate widely, and its English translation became the first illustrated surgical book printed in that language.

The Buch der Cirurgia played a crucial role in disseminating surgical knowledge in Germany. Through compiling established tradition and integrating them with practical experience, Brunschwig provided a manual that enabled German surgeons to participate in the broader progress of European medicine during the late Middle Ages and early Renaissance.

== Liber de arte distillandi de simplicibus ==
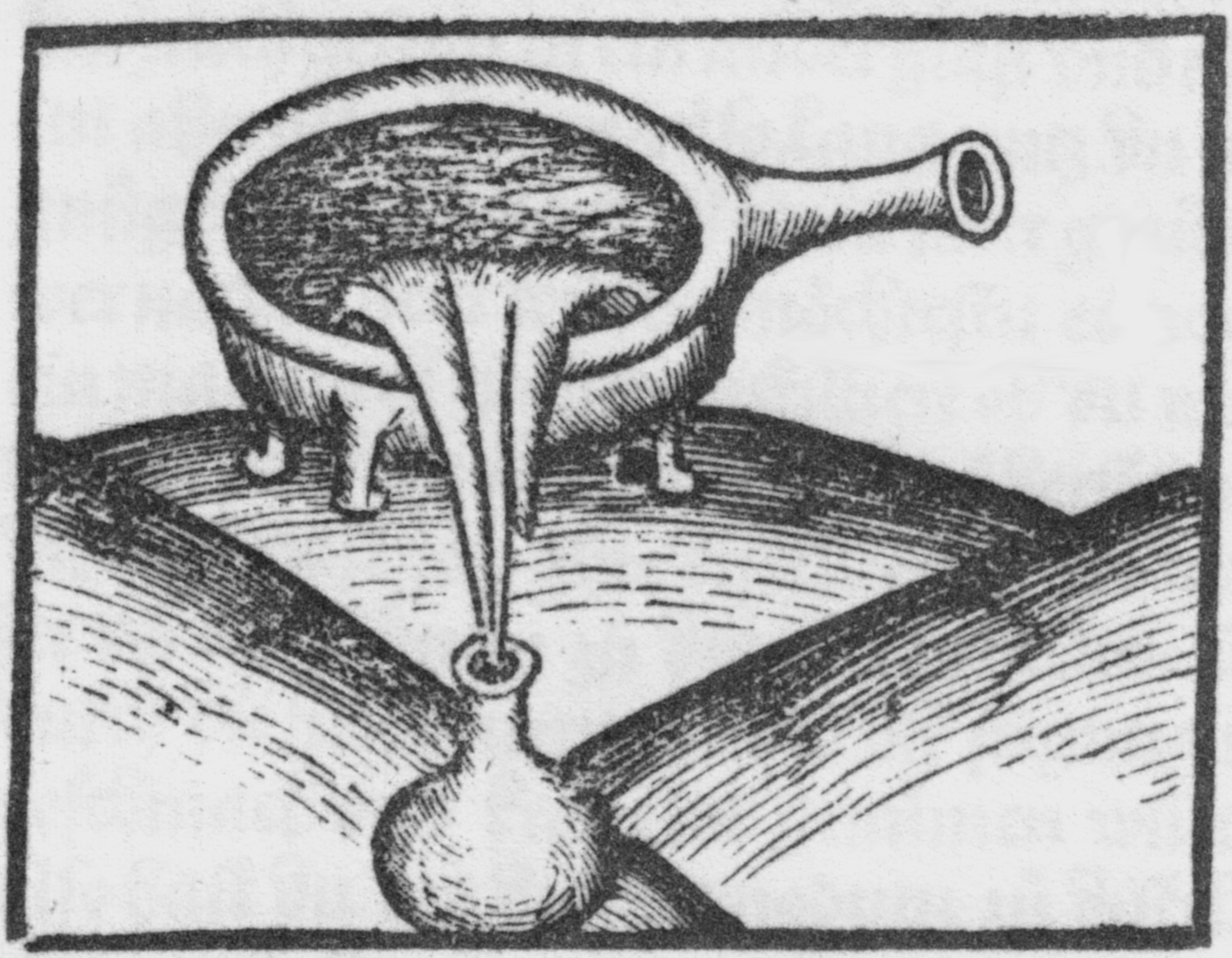
Liber de arte distillandi de simplicibus. 1500. "Distillation" by filtration.

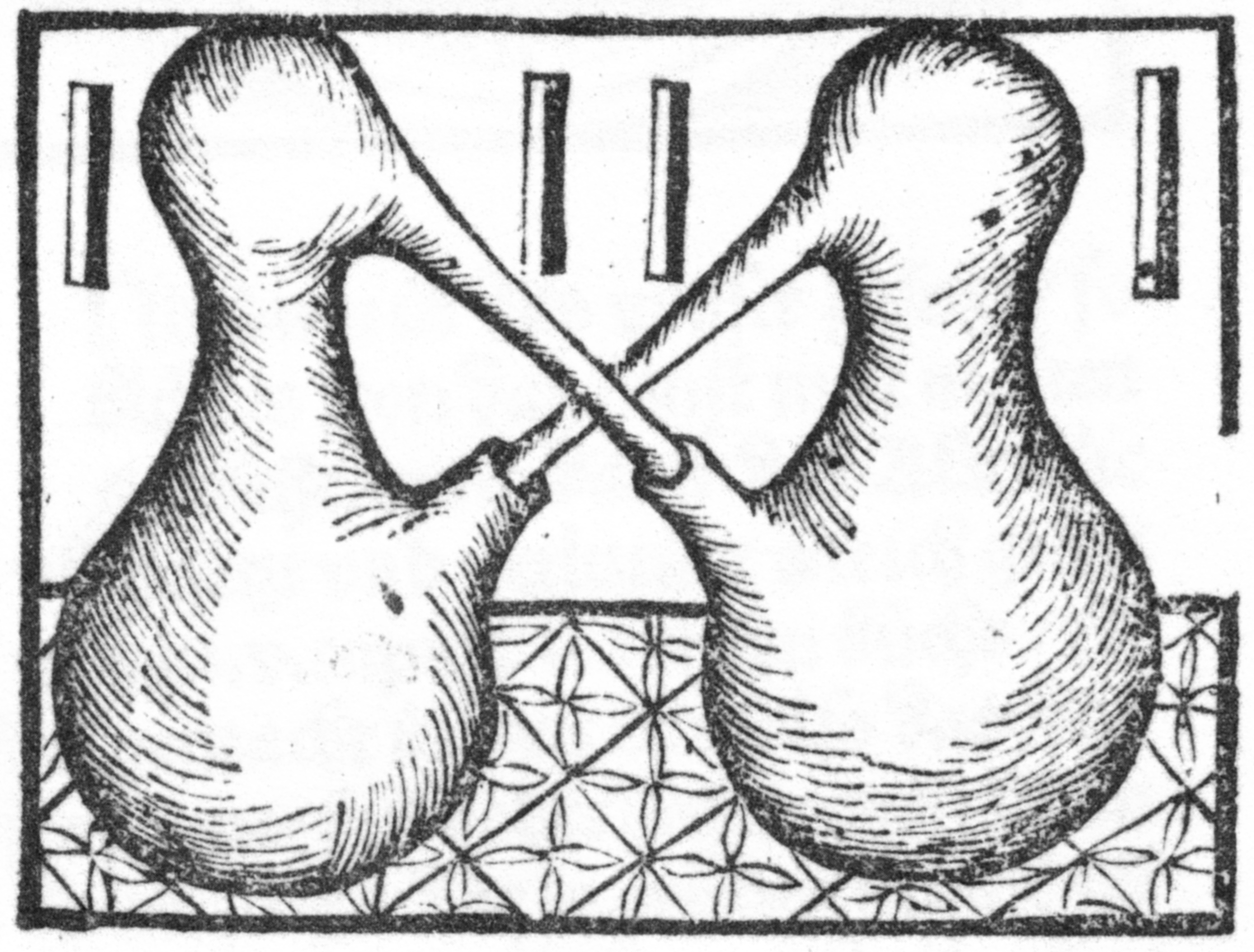
Liber de arte dist. de simpl. 1500. "Distillation" by circulation.

The Liber de arte distillandi de simplicibus (1500) was the earliest printed book dealing with the techniques of distillation from herbal and animal substances. It reflects an early modern understanding of nature in which matter, including the human body, was constantly changing and subject to decay, and presents distillation as a process that could stabilize and purify these materials for medicinal use.

It consisted of three parts:

1. A detailed description of the methods and apparati, showing influences from Jean de Roquetaillades' book De consideratione quintae essentiae. This influence is evident in Brunschwig's understanding of distillation as a process capable of extracting a more stable "quintessence" from corruptible matter. The name of distillation was given by the alchemists not only to the procedure that is nowadays called distillation, but as well to methods like "filtration" and "circulation" that were interpreted as methods of "de-stillatio (dropping down)".
2. An enumeration of herbal and animal substances in alphabetical order with botanical remarks on indigenous plants, based on Brunschwigs' own observations. This section reflects emphasis on practical experience and direct engagement with natural materials. This was followed by the enumeration of indications of the "distilled" medicines. These indications were based as well on the writings in the textbooks of old tradition (Dioscorides ...) as on prescriptions of folk medicine. The "Büchlein von den ausgebrannten Wässern", ascribed to Michael Puff of Vienna and recipes in manuscripts of the 15th century were Brunschwigs' main sources. However, Brunschwig also noted that these remedies could be as harmful as they were beneficial, and therefore recommended that their use be supervised by an experienced physician to avoid upsetting the patient's bodily balance.
3. A list of maladies "from head to feet", with reference to the prescriptions given in the second part. It guides readers in the application of distilled remedies to specific conditions, whose effects were considered predictable but dependent on proper use and timing.

As the last of the fifteenth-century herbals, the Liber de arte distillandi de simplicibus is widely regarded to be an important link between the Middle Ages and modern times. Due to its in-depth description and many illustrations of distillation apparati and techniques, the book was considered to be an authoritative text well into the 16th century. Like the Cirurgia, Brunschwig's distillation texts were pioneering works. The only earlier publication, Michael Puff von Schrick's Büchlein von den ausgebrannten Wässern (Booklet of distilled waters, 1476), served as a reference on the use of distilled remedies but did not provide instructions for producing them. Nevertheless, its repeated reprints and success suggest there was a clear demand for material on the subject. Brunschwig supplied that demand with the first printed works ro describe the art of distillation in any technical and visual way.

Otto Brunfels and Hieronymus Bock, both called "fathers of botany" ("Väter der Botanik") in honour of their truthful description of indigenous plants, respected Brunschwig as their predecessor. Leonhard Fuchs, the third of the "fathers of botany", did not mention Brunschwig at all.

== Liber pestilentialis de venenis epidemie ==
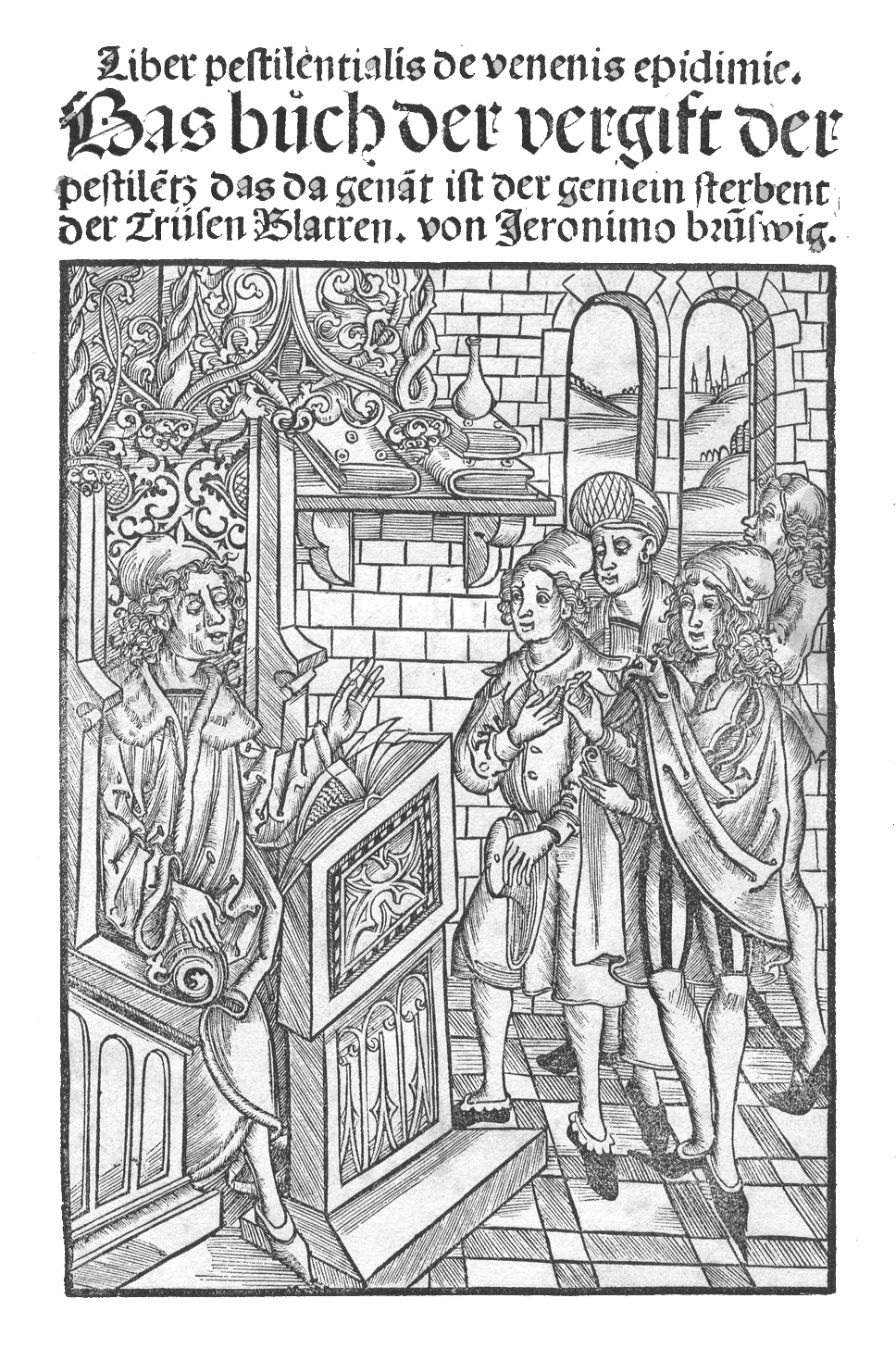
Liber pestilentialis de venenis epidemie

Liber pestilentialis (Strasburg, 1500) is a German-language medical treatise on plague by Hieronymus Brunschwig (c. 1450-1512), a surgeon and apothecary from Strasbourg. It explains the diagnosis, causes, prevention, and treatment of epidemic disease ("pestilence") and was intended for a German-reading audience, especially medical artisans such as surgeons and barbers. The work was printed by Johann Grüninger and is about 26 folios long, divided into five books covering different aspects of plague.

In the text, Brunschwig defines pestilence as a "poisonous moisture" within the human body that arises from corrupted blood and can produce swellings, boils, and other external symptoms. He explains that the disease spreads through the body and may reach the heart if not expelled. He presents multiple causes of plague, including divine punishment for sin, astrological influences, corrupted air and environment, spoiled food and drink, inhalation of poisonous vapors, and sudden changes in seasonal conditions.

A central idea of Liber pestilentialis is the connection between plague and poison, as reflected in its emphasis on toxic processes affecting the whole body. Brunschwig writes for non-physicians and stresses the role of surgeons and barbers in treating external symptoms, noting that physicians sometimes fled plague outbreaks. The work is part of a broader tradition of German-language printed plague treatises that made medical knowledge accessible beyond Latin-trained scholars.

== General and cited references ==
- Agnes Arber. Herbals: Their origin and evolution: A chapter in the history of botany, 1470-1670. Univ. Press, Cambridge 1912.
- Hermann Fischer. Mittelalterliche Pflanzenkunde. München 1929, p. 109-113: Das kleine Destillierbuch des Hieronymus Brunschwig.
- Henry E. Sigerist. Hieronymus Brunschwig and his work. Anhang zu: The book of Cirurgia by Hieronymus Brunschwig. R. Lier, Milano 1923.
- Eleanor Sinclair Rohde. The old English herbals. Minerva, London 1922.
- Karl Sudhoff. Deutsche medizinische Inkunabeln. Bibliographisch-literarische Untersuchungen. J.A. Barth, Leipzig 1908.
