= Samuel Cottereau du Clos =

French physician and apothecary

- Born: 18 November 1598; Paris, France
- Died: 1685 (aged 86–87)
- Relatives: Jacques Friquet (son-in-law)

Samuel Cottereau du Clos or Duclos (18 November 1598 – 1685) was a French physician and apothecary who was among the first members of the Royal Academy of Sciences in France founded by Louis XIV in 1666. He contributed to an early chemical analysis of the mineral waters from around France, examined the composition of plant matter.

== Biography ==
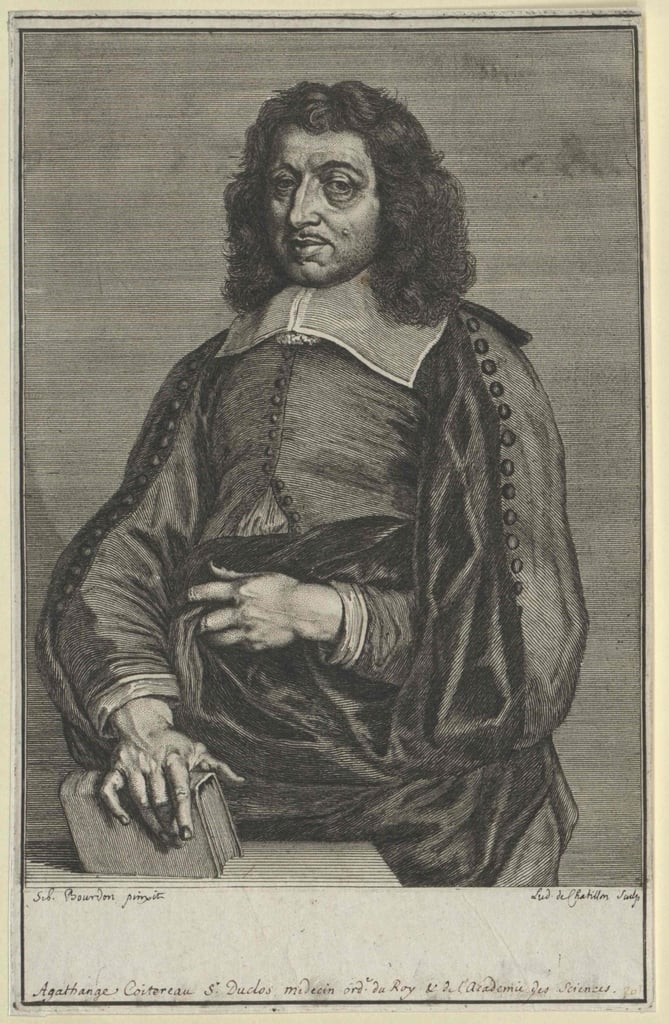
Samuel Cottereau Duclos

Du Clos was born in a Huguenot Protestant family in Paris where he studied medicine and followed the teachings of Paracelsus, clashing with the Galenic ideas at the Faculty of Medicine. His academic career is unclear and is confounded by the presence of three other namesake physicians in the period.

He supported the idea of conducting experiments and took an interest in pharmacology. He set up his own laboratory in 1645. He spent more time on research than on treating patients and spent some time at the private Academie Montmor which came to an end in 1664 following a fire. Du Clos gained a reputation as a careful experimenter and when the Royal Academy of Sciences, known as the company, was created in 1666, he was named member and along with Claude Bourdelin, he was assigned to analyze the mineral waters of France with funding provided by Louis XIV. This was a major shift in science from wealthy private individuals to central funding from the Kingdom. This resulted in collections of large quantities of water samples from nearly sixty sources which were boiled to obtain precipitates which were then analyzed using various reagents. Du Clos came up with 24 tests such as reactions with gall nuts to identify the presence of iron.

His subsequent work was on plant products and he worked with Nicolas Marchant and continued by Denis Dodart from 1671. Du Clos clashed with Dodart who considered distillation based approaches as merely exploratory. Robert Boyle had also attacked the idea of chemical nature of materials as being defined merely by the constituent elements. Du Close agreed with Boyle on the need for experimentation but tried to turn it against Boyle seeking experimental evidence for his claims that corpuscles (roughly meaning molecules) defined the nature of materials. He tried to provide a theory of matter in his works.

From 1683, the persecution of Protestants increased and he converted to Catholicism. He also began to reject alchemical ideas on transmutation and he burnt his papers relating to alchemy in the summer of 1685, particularly to prevent his son-in-law, the painter Jacques Friquet from making any alchemical quest. Du Clos died sometime between 20 August and October 15, 1685.
