= Michelle Duclos =

Québécois independence activist

Michelle Duclos (1938 – 18 December 2017) was a Canadian Québécois independence activist. A resident of Quebec, she was a supporter of the Front de Libération du Québec. While employed as a performer on CFTM-TV in 1965, and a member of the Rassemblement pour l'Indépendance Nationale, she became involved in a plot to bomb the Statue of Liberty in collusion with the Black Liberation Front, a militant Black Power group based in Harlem.

Radio and TV Career
1960-61 : C.J.L.R. - Québec
1962-63 : C.H.L.N.- Trois-Rivières
1963 : Télé-Métropole
1967-1973 : Liban, TV
End of 1973 : C.J.R.P.

== "Monumental" Plot ==
Twenty-six-year-old Canadian Duclos, together with three American men, Walter Augustus Bowe, Khaleel Sultarn Sayyed and accused leader Robert Steele Collier, were arrested in New York on February 16, 1965, in connection with an attempted terrorist plot. The men were part of an extremist organization known as the "Black Liberation Front" (BLF), while Duclos was a member of the Quebec nationalist group Rassemblement pour l'Indépendance Nationale. The BLF was formed by Collier following a trip to Cuba in August 1964, where he met Michelle Saunier. Saunier, a native of Metz, France, and doctoral candidate at the University of Montreal, had traveled to Cuba with a student group. Collier later visited Saunier in Canada in January 1965, where she introduced him to Duclos. Arrangements were made for Duclos to transport explosives to New York in February.

A souvenir replica of the Statue of Liberty had helped inspire Bowe's initial plan to dynamite the monument. The "damned old bitch," as Bowe referred to it, was to be infiltrated through an area leading from the statue's head to its torch-bearing arm. This area was off-limits to the public, but Bowe informed the group that he could acquire the key needed to gain entry, making it easy to blow both the head and arm off of the statue. The plot seemed so simple to the group that they decided to branch out and target the Liberty Bell in Philadelphia and the Washington Monument in D.C.

On February 15 Duclos left Montreal in her 1961 Rambler and headed for New York City with 30 sticks of dynamite and three blasting caps. It is not known where or how she acquired the explosives, or why the group chose to acquire the materials from Canada rather than the United States. Upon her arrival in New York the next day, Duclos cached the explosives in a vacant parking lot on West 239th Street in the Bronx. However, the group had been infiltrated by undercover NYPD rookie cop Raymond A. Wood several months prior, who had notified the FBI before Duclos left Canada. He remained undercover until the explosives were delivered, after which the group was arrested by the FBI before the plot could be executed. All four were charged with federal crimes of conspiring to destroy government property; in addition, Duclos was charged with illegally transporting dynamite into the U.S.

Duclos pleaded guilty to the second count brought against her of illegally transporting dynamite into the U.S. and testified against her fellow conspirators. As a result, she served only three months in prison before her term was lifted and replaced with five years probation and a permanent ban from reentering the country.

== Aftermath ==
Her past actions have led to criticisms of her appointment to government positions from 1985, which included the Quebec Premier Bernard Landry's appointment of Duclos to the position of non-resident representative to Algeria of the province of Quebec in 2002.

== Death ==
Michelle Duclos died on 18 December 2017, at the age of 79.
