= Jacques Antoine Friquet de Vauroze =

French painter

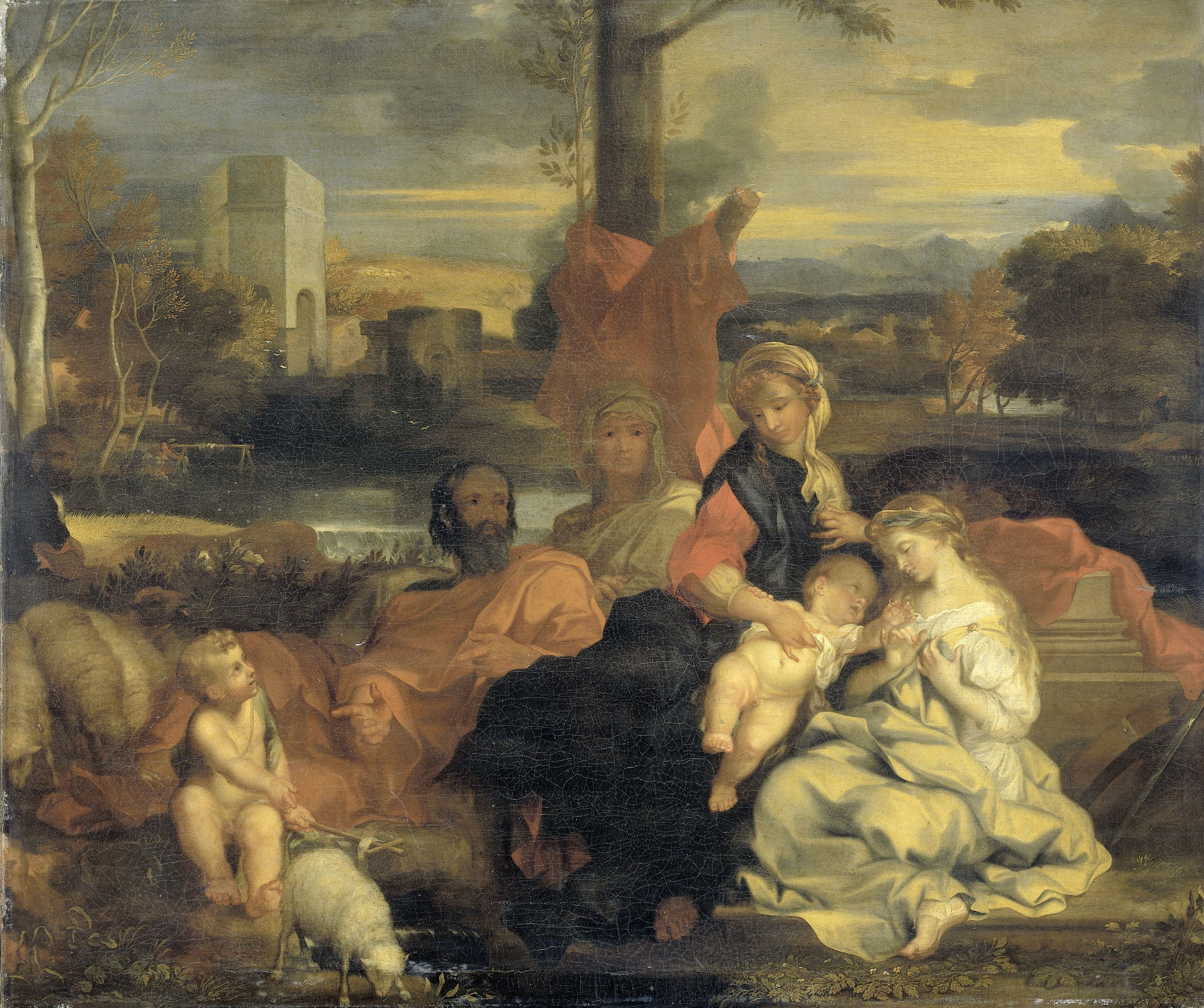
The mystic marriage of St Catherine.; attributed to Friquet, now in the Rijksmuseum

Jacques Antoine Friquet de Vauroze was probably born in 1636 (the dates of 1638 and 1648 can also be found). Little is known of this artist except that he was a scholar of Bourdon, and painted, after the drawings of his master, the gallery of the hotel of M. de Bretonvilliers, president of the Chambre des Comptes. He also painted, in 1667, an allegorical picture of the campaign in Flanders, and another of the conquest of Franche Comté in the following year. He was elected a member and professor of anatomy in the Academy of Paris in 1670: his reception work, The Peace of Aix-la-Chapelle, is in the Louvre. He also engraved some of the works of Bourdon. He died in Paris in 1716.
