= Philipp Ulstad =

Philipp Ulstad (Latin: Phillipus Ulstadius; English: Philip Ulstad) was a nobleman from Nuremberg, who taught medicine at the academy in Fribourg at the beginning of the sixteenth century.

He is known for his work Coelum philosophorum seu de secretis naturae liber (Fribourg, 1525), a major work of early modern distillation technology. The Coelum philosophorum contains extracts from Arnald of Villanova, Ramon Llull, Albertus Magnus, and John of Rupescissa. It saw numerous editions, including translations into German (Strasbourg, 1527) and French (Paris, 1546).

He was particularly influenced by John of Rupescissa and his work on the quintessence and its use in medicine. However, he did not believe the quintessence to be incorruptible, as did Rupescissa, but rather far less corruptible than the other four elements. Ulstad distanced himself from the philosophical strands of alchemy, and focused on the technical aspects, which he wanted to make accessible to apothecaries, doctors, and other practitioners. He described the preparation of the quintessence from plants, minerals, metals (gold, among others) and referred to medical applications throughout.

He also authored a short text on the plague (De epidemia tractatus).

Little is known of his life outside of his published work.

== Works ==
- De epidemia tractatus. Basel, 1526.
- Coelum philosophorum seu de secretis naturae liber. Fribourg, 1525. German translation, Strasbourg, 1527; French translation, Paris, 1546.

== Bibliography ==
- Atkinson, Edward R., and Arthur H. Hughes. "The Coelum Philosophorum of Philipp Ulstad." Journal of Chemical Education 16 (1939): 103–107.
- Fichman, Martin. Dictionary of Scientific Biography.
