= Hervé Duclos-Lassalle =

French cyclist

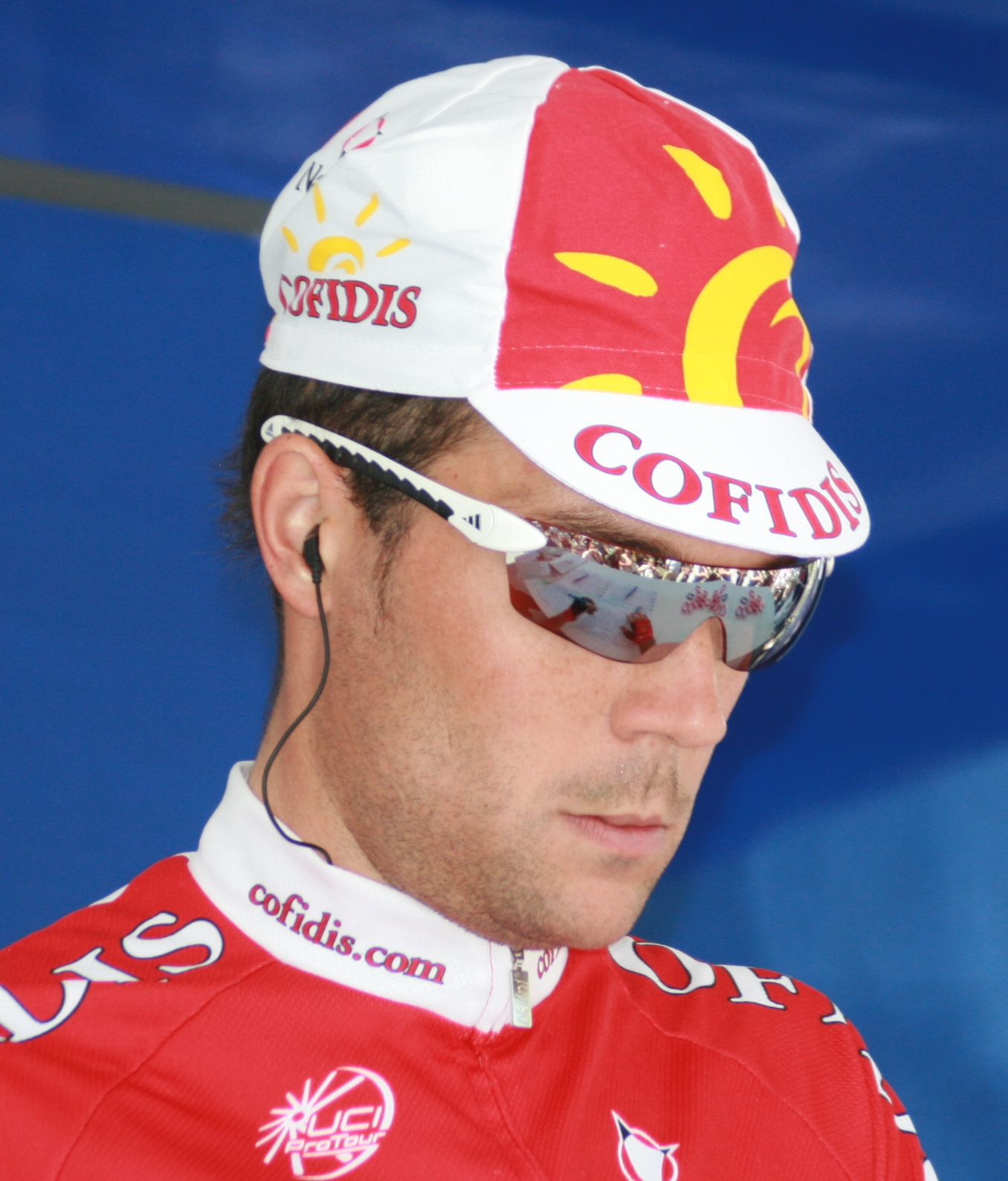

Personal information
- Full name: Hervé Duclos-Lassalle
- Born: 24 December 1979 (age 46) Pau, France
- Height: 1.74 m (5 ft 9 in)
- Weight: 63 kg (139 lb)

Cycling career
- Sport: Cycling
- Discipline: Road
- Role: Rider

Professional team
- 2005–2009: Cofidis

Hervé Duclos-Lassalle (born 24 December 1979 in Pau) is a French professional road bicycle racer. His father is Gilbert Duclos-Lassalle. He was the first rider to leave the 2008 Tour de France after breaking his left wrist on the first stage.

== Career highlights ==
=== Major results ===
2003
1st Overall Tour du Loir-et-Cher
2004
1st Stage 5a Vuelta Ciclista a Navarra
2008
1st Grand Prix d'Ouverture La Marseillaise
11th Gent–Wevelgem

=== Grand Tour general classification results timeline ===
Grand Tour	2005	2006	2007	2008
Giro d'Italia	—	—	103	—
Tour de France	—	—	—	DNF
Vuelta a España	119	DNF	—	—

Legend
DSQ	Disqualified
DNF	Did not finish
