= Jean de Roquetaillade =

French alchemist (1300s)

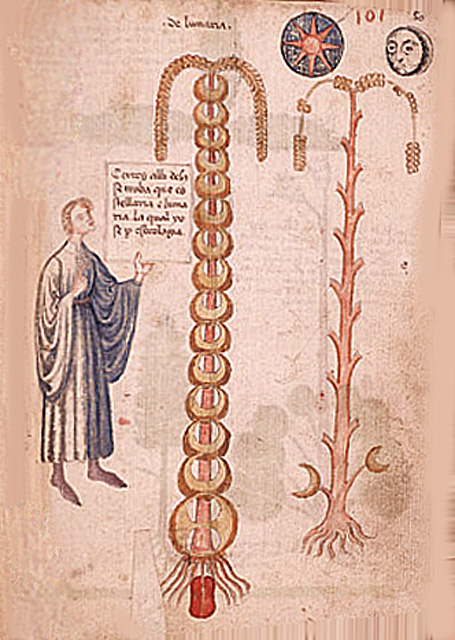
- Manuscript from 1350 by de Roquetaillade
- Born: ca. 1310; Yolet or Marcolès
- Died: between 1366 and 1370; Avignon
- Other name: Johannes de Rupescissa
- Occupations: Franciscan, alchemist

Jean de Roquetaillade, also known as John of Rupescissa, (ca. 1310 – between 1366 and 1370) was a French Franciscan alchemist and eschatologist.

== Biography ==
After studying philosophy for five years at Toulouse, he entered the Franciscan monastery at Aurillac, where he continued his studies for five years longer.

His experiments in distillation led to the discovery of what he termed aqua vitæ, or usually quinta essentia, and commended as a panacea for all disease. Rupescissa argued that distilled alcohol was "incorruptible and highly volatile," identifying it as the quintessence because it behaved unlike the four classical elements. His work as an alchemist forms the subject-matter of De consideratione quintæ essentiæ (Basle, 1561) and De extractione quintæ essentiæ; likewise Libellus de conficiendo vero lapide philosophico ad sublevandam inopiam papæ et cleri in tempore tribulationis (Strasburg, 1659). In De condideratione quintæ essentiæ, he claimed that repeated distillation of wine produced a fifth essence that could act as a powerful medicine and prevent flesh from rotting.

Alchemical illustration showing two plants receiving the influences of the sun and the moon, symbolizing the celestial forces believed to act on earthly matter in the production of quintessence.

His prophecies and violent denunciation of ecclesiastical abuses brought him into disfavour with his superiors, resulting in his imprisonment in the local Franciscan convents. During a transfer from one convent to another, he was able to reach Avignon and present an appeal before Pope Clement VI in 1349. While there he wrote in 1349 his Visiones seu revelationes, and in 1356 Vade Mecum in tribulatione and Liber Ostensor. His other works include commentaries on the Oraculum Cyrilli, the recently discovered Sexdequiloquium and many other lost treatises and commentaries on various prophecies.

He died between 1366 and 1370, probably at Avignon.

== Works ==
- Liber Lucis
- Liber de Consideratione Quintae Essentiae
- Commentarius super Cyrillum (1345-1349)
- Liber Secretorum Eventuum /Liber Conspectorum Archanorum (finished in 1349 in Avignon); modern edition: Christine Morerod-Fattebert, Robert E. Lerner, Le Liber secretorum eventuum de Jean de Roquetaillade, Fribourg: Editions universitaires, 1994.
- De Oneribus Orbis : a comment on the prophecy Veh Mundo in Centum Annis, related to Arnaldus de Villa Nova.
- Liber Ostensor (finished in 1356), modern edition: Jean de Roquetaillade, Liber ostensor quod adesse festinant tempora. Édition critique sous la direction d'André Vauchez, par Clemence Thévenaz Modestin et Christine Morerod-Fattebert, Rome: Ecole française de Rome, 2005.
- Vade mecum in tribulatione (finished at the end of 1356):

(1) editio princeps in: Edward Brown, Fasciculus rerum expetendarum ac fugiendarum II, London, 1690,

(2) modern editions (the authors edit different versions as the authentic text of Rupescissa: Tealdi takes for it the version of the family α, according to Kaup the secondary Versio plena expolita; Kaup holds for authentic the Versio plena, according to Tealdi the secondary version of the family δ; the only double review so far (cf. Julia E. Wannenmacher in Journal of Ecclesiastical History 70.1 (2019), 165–166) recommends Kaup for textual work and, as an essential complement to his factual commentary, Tealdi):

a) Giovanni di Rupescissa. Vade mecum in tribulatione, critical edition by Elena Tealdi, historical introduction by Robert E. Lerner and Gian Luca Potestà, Milan: Vita e Pensiero. Dies Nova, 2015,

b) John of Rupescissa's Vade mecum in tribulacione. A Late Medieval Eschatological Manual for the Forthcoming Thirteen Years of Horror and Hardship. Edited by Matthias Kaup, London/New York: Routledge. Church, Faith and Culture in the Medieval West, 2016.

- Litterae (various letters)
- Epistola Praedicens Quosdam Eventus et Tribulationes
- Sexdequiloquium

Later authors on distillation, including Hieronymus Brunschwig, incorporated material based on Rupescissa's ideas about the quintessence in their sixteenth-century treatises.

== Studies ==
- Jeanne Bignami-Odier, Etudes sur Jean de Roquetaillade (Johannes de Rupescissa), Paris, Vrin, 1952
- Robert Halleux, « Les ouvrages alchimiques de Jean de Rupescissa », Histoire littéraire de la France, 41, Paris, Imprimerie nationale, 1981, p. 241-284.
- Sylvain Piron, « L’ecclésiologie franciscaine de Jean de Roquetaillade », Franciscan Studies, 65, 2007, p. 281-294.
- Sylvain Piron, Le Sexdequiloquium de Jean de Roquetaillade, Oliviana, 3, 2009 : http://oliviana.revues.org/index327.html.
- Robert E. Lerner, “John the Astonishing”, Oliviana, 3, 2009 : http://oliviana.revues.org/index335.html.
- DeVun, L. Prophecy, Alchemy, and the End of Time: John of Rupescissa in the Late Middle Ages (New York, 2009).
- Udo Benzenhöfer Johannes‘ de Rupescissa. Liber de consideratione quintae essentiae omnium rerum deutsch. Studien zur Alchemia medica des 15. bis 17. Jahrhunderts mit kritischer Edition des Textes. Steiner, Stuttgart 1989.
