= Materia medica =

Historical Latin term for pharmacology

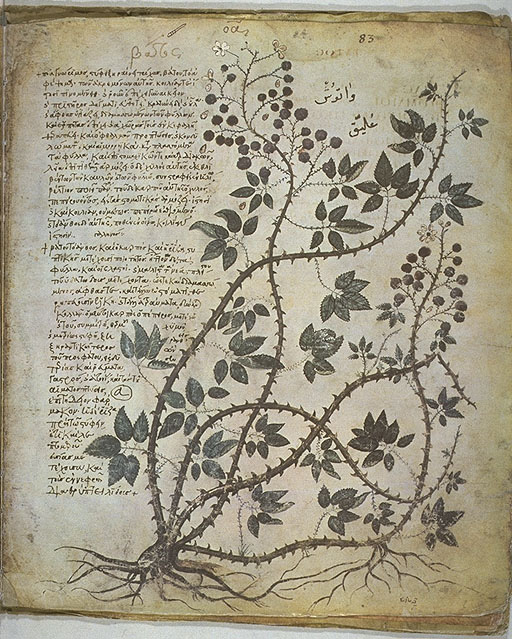
Page from the 6th-century Vienna Dioscurides, an illuminated version of the 1st-century De Materia Medica

Materia medica (lit.: 'medical material/substance') is a Latin term from the history of pharmacy for the body of collected knowledge about the therapeutic properties of any substance used for healing (i.e., medications). The term derives from the title of a work by the Ancient Greek physician Pedanius Dioscorides in the 1st century AD, De materia medica, 'On medical material' (Περὶ ὕλης ἰατρικῆς, Peri hylēs iatrikēs, in Greek).

The term materia medica was used from the period of the Roman Empire until the 20th century, but has now been generally replaced in medical education contexts by the term pharmacology. The term survives in the title of the British Medical Journal's "Materia Non Medica" column.

== Ancient civilizations ==
=== Ancient Egypt ===
The earliest known writing about medicine was a 110-page Egyptian papyrus. It was supposedly written by the god Thoth in about 16 BC. The Ebers Papyrus is an ancient recipe book dated to approximately 1552 BC. It contains a mixture of magic and medicine with invocations to banish disease and a catalogue of useful plants, minerals, magic amulets and spells. The most famous Egyptian physician was Imhotep, who lived in Memphis around 2500 B.C. Imhotep's materia medica consisted of procedures for treating head and torso injuries, tending of wounds, and prevention and curing of infections, as well as advanced principles of hygiene.

=== Ancient India ===
In India, the Ayurveda is traditional medicine that emphasizes plant-based treatments, hygiene, and balance in the body's state of being. Indian materia medica included knowledge of plants, where they grow in all season, methods for storage and shelf life of harvested materials. It also included directions for making juice from vegetables, dried powders from herb, cold infusions and extracts.

=== Ancient China ===
The earliest Chinese manual of materia medica, the Shennong Bencaojing (Shennong Emperor's Classic of Materia Medica), was compiled in the 1st century AD during the Han dynasty, attributed to the mythical Shennong. It lists some 365 medicines, of which 252 are herbs. Earlier literature included lists of prescriptions for specific ailments, exemplified by the Recipes for Fifty-Two Ailments found in the Mawangdui tomb, which was sealed in 168 BC. Succeeding generations augmented the Shennong Bencao Jing, as in the Yaoxing lun (Treatise on the Nature of Medicinal Herbs), a 7th-century Tang dynasty treatise on herbal medicine.

== Ancient Greece ==
=== Hippocrates ===
In Greece, Hippocrates (born 460 BC) was a philosopher later known as the Father of Medicine. He founded a school of medicine that focused on treating the causes of disease rather than its symptoms. Disease was dictated by natural laws and therefore could be treated through close observation of symptoms. His treatises, Aphorisms and Prognostics, discuss 265 drugs, the importance of diet and external treatments for diseases.

=== Theophrastus ===
Theophrastus (390–280 BC) was a disciple of Aristotle and a philosopher of natural history, considered by historians as the Father of Botany. He wrote a treatise entitled Historia Plantarium about 300 BC. It was the first attempt to organize and classify plants, plant lore, and botanical morphology in Greece. It provided physicians with a rough taxonomy of plants and details of medicinal herbs and herbal concoctions.

=== Galen ===
Galen was a philosopher, physician, pharmacist and prolific medical writer. He compiled an extensive record of the medical knowledge of his day and added his own observations. He wrote on the structure of organs, but not their uses; the pulse and its association with respiration; the arteries and the movement of blood; and the uses of theriacs. "In treatises such as On Theriac to Piso, On Theriac to Pamphilius, and On Antidotes, Galen identified theriac as a sixty-four-ingredient compound, able to cure any ill known". His work was rediscovered in the 15th century and became the authority on medicine and healing for the next two centuries. His medicine was based on the regulation of the four humors (blood, phlegm, black bile, and yellow bile) and their properties (wet, dry, hot, and cold).

=== Dioscorides's De materia medica ===
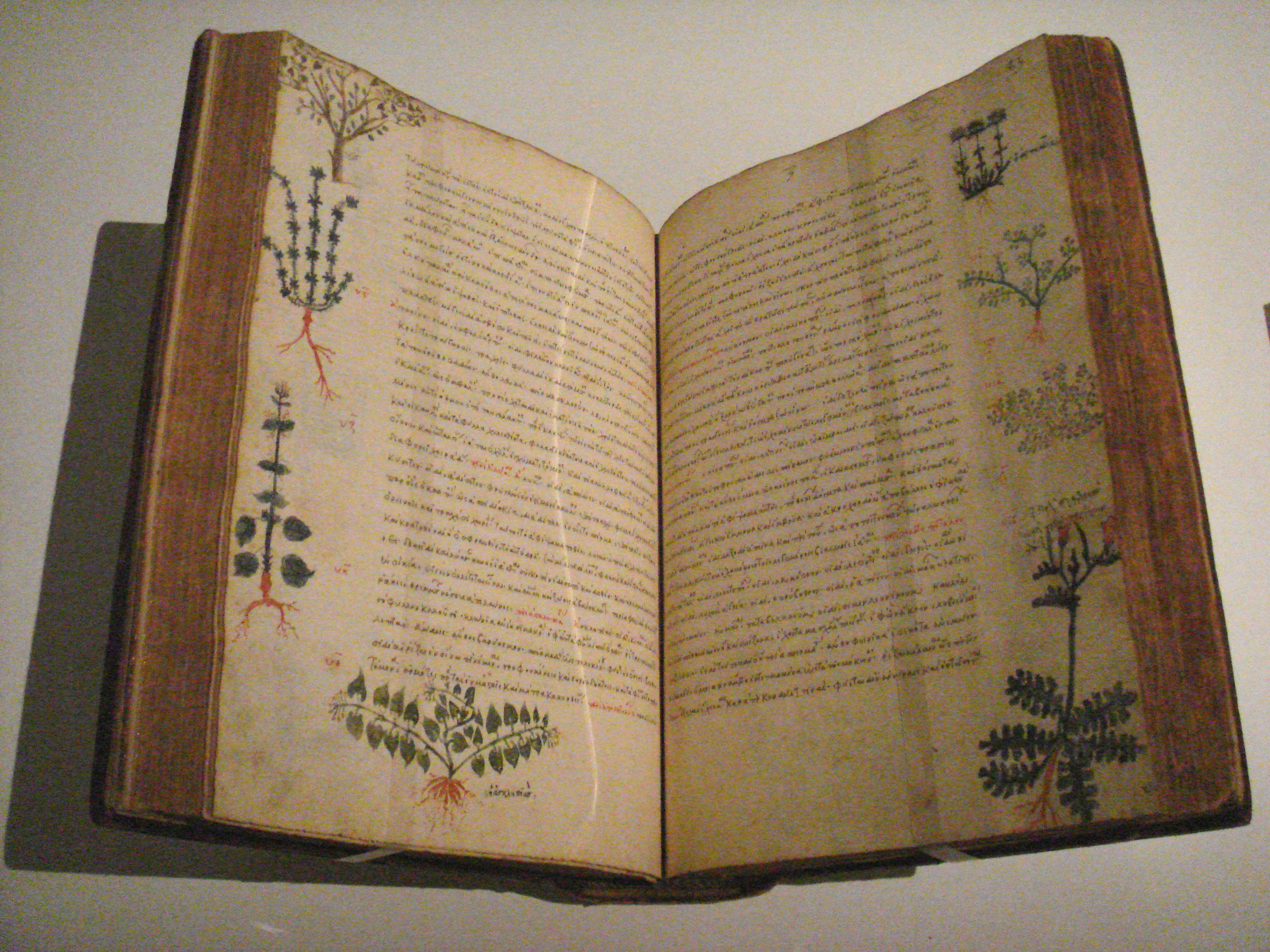
Dioscorides, De materia medica, Byzantium, 15th century.

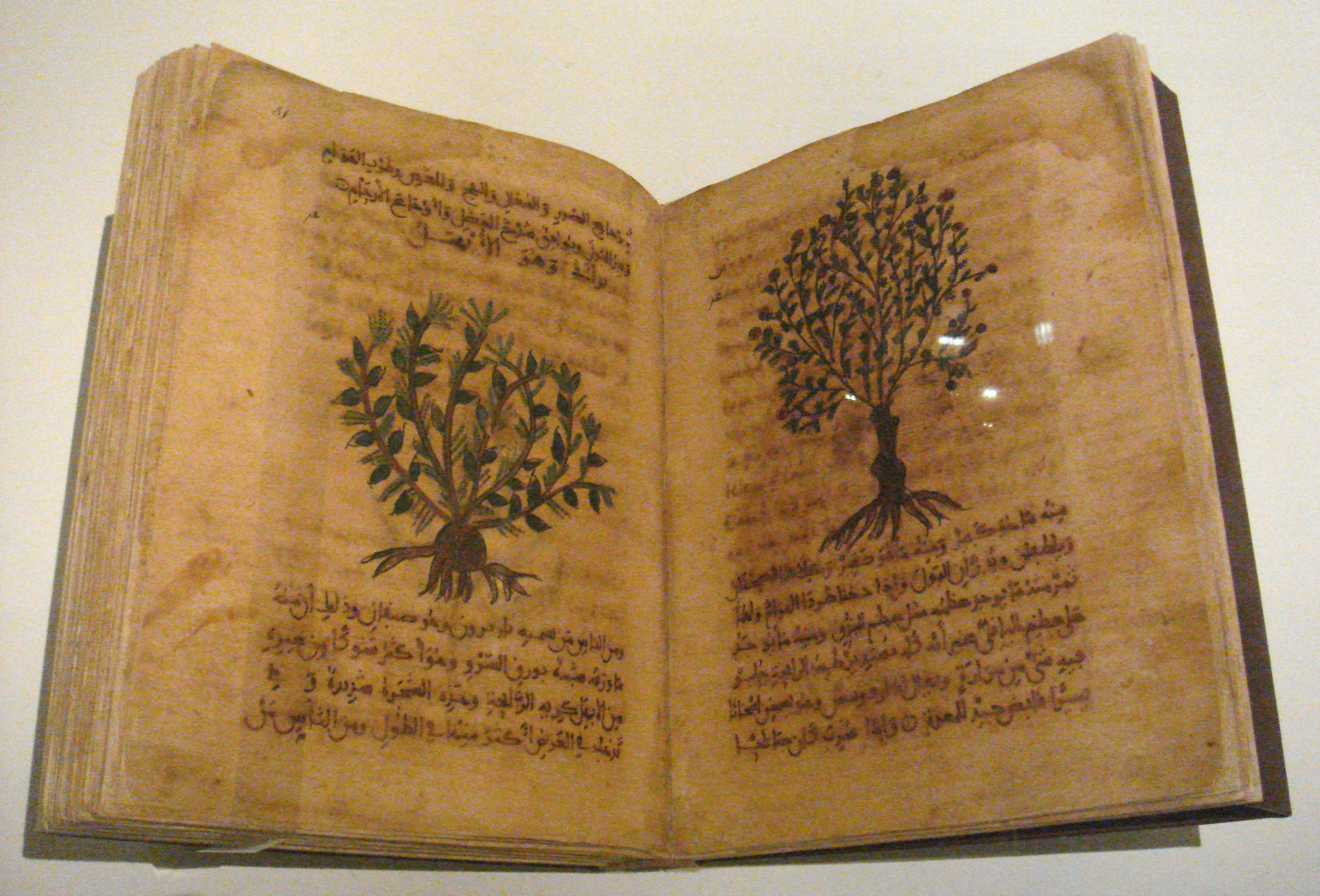
Dioscorides De materia medica in Arabic, Spain, 12th-13th century

The Greek physician Pedanius Dioscorides, of Anazarbus in Asia Minor, wrote a five-volume treatise concerning medical matters, entitled Περὶ ὕλης ἰατρικῆς in Greek or De materia medica in Latin. This famous commentary covered about 600 plants along with therapeutically useful animal and mineral products. It documented the effects of drugs made from these substances on patients. De materia medica was the first extensive pharmacopeia, including about a thousand natural product drugs (mostly plant-based), 4,740 medicinal usages for drugs, and 360 medical properties (such as antiseptic, anti-inflammatory, stimulant). The book was heavily translated, and portrayed some of the emblematic actions of physicians and herbalists. One such page is Physician Preparing an Elixir.

Dioscorides' plant descriptions use an elementary classification, though he cannot be said to have used botanical taxonomy. Book one describes the uses for aromatic oils, salves and ointments, trees and shrubs, and fleshy fruits, even if not aromatic. Book two included uses for animals, parts of animals, animal products, cereals, leguminous, malvaceous, cruciferous, and other garden herbs. Book three detailed the properties of roots, juices, herbs and seeds used for food or medicine. Book four continued to describe the uses for roots and herbs, specifically narcotic and poisonous medicinal plants. Book five dealt with the medicinal uses for wine and metallic ores. It is a precursor to all modern pharmacopeias, and is considered one of the most influential herbal books in history. It remained in use until about 1600 AD.

== Medieval ==
=== Middle Eastern ===
Avicenna (980–1037 AD) was a Persian philosopher, physician, and Islamic scholar. He wrote about 40 books on medicine. His two most famous books are The Canon of Medicine and The Book of Healing, used in medieval universities as medical textbooks. He did much to popularize the connection between Greek and Arabic medicine, translating works by Hippocrates, Aristotle and Galen into Arabic. Avicenna stressed the importance of diet, exercise, and hygiene. He also was the first to describe parasitic infection, to use urine for diagnostic purposes and discouraged physicians from the practice of surgery because it was too base and manual.

=== European ===
In medieval Europe, medicinal herbs and plants were cultivated in monastery and nunnery gardens beginning about the 8th century. Charlemagne gave orders for the collection of medicinal plants to be grown systematically in his royal garden. This royal garden was an important precedent for botanical gardens and physic gardens that were established in the 16th century. It was also the beginning of the study of botany as a separate discipline. In about the 12th century, medicine and pharmacy began to be taught in universities.

Shabbethai Ben Abraham, better known as Shabbethai Donnolo, (913–c.982) was a 10th-century Italian Jew and the author of an early Hebrew text, Antidotarium. It consisted of detailed drug descriptions, medicinal remedies, practical methods for preparing medicine from roots. It was a veritable glossary of herbs and drugs used during the medieval period. Donnollo was widely travelled and collected information from Arabic, Greek and Roman sources.

In the Early and High Middle Ages, Nestorian Christians were banished for their heretical views that they carried to Asia Minor. The Greek text was translated into Syriac when pagan Greek scholars fled east after Constantine the Great's conquest of Byzantium, Stephanos (son of Basilios, a Christian living in Baghdad under the Khalif Motawakki) made an Arabic translation of De Materia Medica from the Greek in 854. In 948 the Byzantine Emperor Romanos II, son and co-regent of Constantine VII, sent a beautifully illustrated Greek manuscript of De materia medica to the Spanish Khalif, Abd al-Rahman III. In 1250, Syriac scholar Barhebraeus prepared an illustrated Syriac version, which was translated into Arabic.

== Early modern ==
Matthaeus Silvaticus, Avicenna, Galen, Dioscorides, Platearius and Serapio inspired the appearance of three main works printed in Mainz: In 1484 the Herbarius, the following year the Gart der Gesundheit, and in 1491 the Ortus Sanitatis. The works contain 16, 242 and 570 references to Dioscorides, respectively.

The first appearance of Dioscorides as a printed book was a Latin translation printed at Colle, Italy by Johanemm Allemanun de Mdemblik in 1478. The Greek version appeared in 1499 by Manutius at Venice.

The most useful books of botany, pharmacy and medicine used by students and scholars were supplemented commentaries on Dioscorides, including the works of Fuchs, Anguillara, Mattioli, Maranta, Cesalpino, Dodoens, Fabius Columna, Gaspard and Johann Bauhin, and De Villanueva/Servetus. In several of these versions, the annotations and comments exceed the Dioscoridean text and have much new botany. Printers were not merely printing the authentic materia medica, but hiring experts on the medical and botanical field for criticism, commentaries, that would raise the stature of the printers and the work.

Most of these authors copied each other, from previous works. It was normal to add previous commentaries and marginalia, to make the text look more enriched or thorough.

There were several De Materia Medica works noted as Anonymous A, B, C and D by the expert on Dioscorides-De Materia Medica professor John M. Riddle. The Anonymous A has to do with authors on translations of handwriting. Riddle proved Anonymous C to be Bruyerinus Champier.

During the 16th century, the most representative among them were Ermolao Barbaro, Jean Ruel, Broyeurinus, Michel de Villeneuva, Pietro Andrea Mattioli, Andres Laguna, Marcello Virgilio, Martin Mathee and Valerius Cordus.

In 1789, William Cullen published his two volume A Treatise of the Materia Medica, which was highly valued by other medical practitioners throughout Europe.

=== Ermolao Barbaro ===
The work of the Italian physician and humanist Ermolao Barbaro was published in 1516, 23 years after his death. Poliziano wrote to Ermalao Barbaro, forwarding a manuscript of the 1st-century pharmacologist Pedanius Dioscorides, asking him to send it back "annotated by that very learned hand of yours, thus lending the volume additional value and authority." Barbaro was professor of the University of Padua in 1477 and translated many texts from Greek to Latin. He sought to avoid mistakes by gathering as many manuscripts as he could for checking the texts. He claimed to have corrected 5000 mistakes between two editions of Pliny the Elder's Naturalis historia, a work he found very similar to Materia Medica, for which he used at least two editions as well.

The result of Barbaro's effort occupied no fewer than 58 pages printed in three columns of about 50 entries each. The work provides a key to over 9,000 items; all references were to pages. This was the first annotated Latin translation of Dioscorides' Materia Medica, and so Barbaro became the earliest of the Renaissance translators of Dioscorides, a practice that saw its golden age in the 16th century. Barbaro's work was later corrected by Giovanni-Battista.

=== Jean Ruel ===
Jean Ruel was the dean of the Faculty of Medicine and physician to King Francis I of France. He perfected the Latin translation of the Materia Medica directly from the "princeps" edition. He tried to develop a translation joining philology, botany and medicine. This work, printed in 1516 by Henri Estienne/Stephano, became very popular, having 20 editions during the 16th century. He published editions until 1537, printed by Simon de Colines.

From this point, Latin was the preferred language for presenting De Materia Medica, and Ruel's editions became the basis from which many other important authors would start to create their own Materia Medica. Ruel was also teacher of two great De Materia Medica authors: Michel de Villeneuve and Andres Laguna.

=== Bruyerinus ===
Bruyerinus Champier was the nephew of Symphorien Champier, and physician of Henry II of France. He was an Arabist, and translated works of Avicenna. In 1550 he published his first Materia Medica, printed by Balthazar Arnoullet in Lyons. This work had a second edition in 1552 printed by Arnoullet in Lyon and Vienne. Both works were illustrated with figures by Fuchs, but in this last edition there were also 30 woodcuts by the botanist and physician Jacob Dalechamp. It seems that the reason that he used his initials, H.B.P., and not his full name in the work; it could be that he practically transcribed commentaries of Mattioli.

=== Michael Servetus ===
According to Spanish scholar González Echeverría in several communications in the ISHM, the John M. Riddle Anonymous B (De Materia Medica of 1543) would be Michael Servetus, and that the Anonymous D (De Materia Medica of 1554 of Mattioli plus non-signed commentaries) is two commentarians, Servetus and Mattioi, being the last one hired for editing the "Lyons printers' Tribute to Michel de Villeneuve" edition. Michael Servetus, using the name "Michel de Villeneuve", who already had his first death sentence from the University of Paris, anonymously published a Dioscorides-De Materia Medica in 1543, printed by Jean & Francois Frellon in Lyon. It has 277 marginalia and 20 commentaries on a De Materia Medica of Jean Ruel. According to Gonzalez Echeverría, to be associated to an anonymous Pharmacopeia that "Michel de Villeneuve" published the same year, meant to be a single unit, which is typical when it comes to De Materia Medica-Pharmacopeia. This work had six later editions, in 1546 and 1547 by Jean Frellon, who considered Michael de Villeneuve "his friend and brother", another in 1547 by Thibaut Payen, etc.

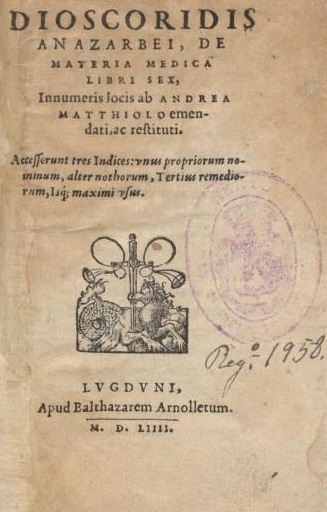
One of the four covers (Arnoullet) of the "Lyons printers' tribute edition to Michel de Villeneuve" edition of the Materia Medica. By Michel de Villeneuve & Pietro Andrea Mattioli, printed by Balthazar Arnoullet in 1554, in Lyons.

There is another Materia Medica with commentaries on a Ruel edition of 1537, printed by Simon de Colines. This work contains hundreds of manuscript marginaia, all along 420 out of 480 pages. The scholar Gonzalez Echeverria demonstrated in the ISHM with a graphological, historical and linguistic study that this task was carried out by Michel de Villeneuve. It also demonstrated that this document was written by the same hand that wrote the famous "Manuscript of Paris", a work also by Michel de Villeneuve, consisting of a draft for his Christianismo Restitutio. "The manuscript of the Complutense" is not just a union of the ideas of the previous works by Michel de Villeneuve, Syropum Ratio, etc., but also of the later works, Enquiridion, De Materia Medica of 1543, sharing with this last many of its 20 big commentaries, for instance.

According to this theory, in 1554, after the immolation of Michael de Villeneuve/Servetus, the editors and printers that had worked with him would have decided to make a new De Materia Medica as a tribute to their colleague and friend. All the commentaries that could identify Michel de Villeneuve as the author disappeared, but the rest are copied from his work of 1543. It is a very strange edition because there exist four different kinds of copies with different covers, one per editor: Jean Frellon, Guillaume Rouillé, Antoine Vicent and Balthazar Arnoullet, who was also the printer of this unique edition, in Lyons. For developing a bigger work and to blur the mark of Michel de Villeneuve, they hired the expert on De Materia Medica, Pietro Andrea Mattioli.

=== Pietro Andrea Mattioli ===
Pietro Andrea Mattioli was a renowned botanist and physician. He published a translation of De Materia Medica into Italian in 1544 and ten years later published a work in Latin with all the plants of Dioscorides and 562 woodcut illustrations. It appeared in 1554, printed by Vicenzo Valgrisi, in Venice. Mattioli made a massive contribution to the original text of Pedani's Dioscorides. In some sections Mattioli added information that exceeded 15 times the length of the original text. It resulted in a very big extension of the work, in beauty and information. It was later translated into German, French and Bohemian.

Mattioli held a post in the Imperial Court as physician to Ferdinand II, Archduke of Austria, and the Emperor Maximilian II, Holy Roman Emperor. This position granted him an immense influence. He frequently tested the effects of poisonous plants on prisoners in order to popularize his works. He also affirmed that Jean Ruel had declared some information in the lycopsis chapter of his Materia Medica. This is false, but still Mattioli used it as a reason for attacking Ruel. He did not tolerate either rivals nor corrections. The naturalists and physicians daring to disagree with him, or who had corrected him, were attacked. The list of important characters that were admonished, rebuked, or pursued by the Inquisition contains Wieland, Anguillara, Gesner, Lusitanus and others. This made editions of Matioli's De Materia Medica omnipresent throughout the continent, especially in northern Europe.

=== Andrés Laguna ===
In 1554 the physician Andrés Laguna published his Annotations on Dioscorides of Anazarbus printed by Guillaume Rouillé in Lyons. Laguna was the first to translate De Materia Medica into Castilian. His translation was made from one of the Latin editions of Jean Ruel. It was also based on classes Laguna took from Ruel as his pupil in Paris. Laguna points out some of his teacher's erroneous translations, and adds many commentaries, which make up more than half of the total work.

Laguna explored many Mediterranean areas and obtained results concerning many new herbs; he also added these prescriptions and commentaries to the recipes and teachings of Pedanius' Dioscorides. He also includes some animal and mineral products but only those related to simple medicines, that is, animal and mineral products that are medicine or are parts of a medical compound. This was not an illustrated work. In 1555 he re-edited this work with woodcuts. It was reprinted twenty-two times by the end of the 18th century; Laguna wrote very well, with explanations and practical commentaries. He refers to anecdotes, adds commentaries on the plants, provides their synonyms in different languages, and explains their uses in the 16th century. These qualities and the number of woodcuts made this work very popular and appreciated in medicine far beyond the 16th century. He had problems with Mattioli for using some of his commentaries without mentioning him.

Laguna had problems with the Inquisition, just like Michel de Villeneuve, for both were Jewish-converso, a fact that could have made them limit their commentaries to avoid risks. Nevertheless, he was the physician of Charles V and the Pope Julius III, and that helped to establish his work as the last word in Materia Medica, and as the basis of Spanish botany.

=== Valerius Cordus ===
The physician Valerius Cordus, son of the famous botanist Euricius Cordus, went through many woods and mountains discovering hundreds of new herbs. He gave lectures on Dioscorides at the University of Wittenberg, which experts from the university attended. Cordus had no intention of publishing his work. Five years after his death, a Materia Medica with commentaries was published. It contained the index of the Botanologicon, the outstanding work of his father Euricius, who developed a scientific classification of the plants. The following pages are on Gessner's Nomenclature, relating the different synonyms used for referring to the same plants of the Dioscorides work.

The abstracts of the lectures of Valerius Cordus go from page 449 to 553 as commentaries. This section consisted of a very refined explanation of Dioscorides' teachings with more specifics on the variety of plants and habitats, and corrections of errors. Cordus refers to both his and his father's observations. Eucharius Rösslin's herbal illustrations are prominent in this work, followed by 200 of Fuchs. This work and the model of botanical description and, many consider it the boldest innovation that was made by any botanist of the 16th century.

=== Martin Mathee ===
The French physician Martin Mathee published in 1553 the French translation of De Materia Medica, printed by Balthazar Arnoullet, in Lyons. This granted much more access for the students of medicine to the teachings.

The Greek version was reprinted in 1518, 1523 and 1529, and reprinted in 1518, 1523 and 1529. Between 1555 and 1752 there were at least 12 Spanish editions; and as many in Italian from 1542. French editions appeared from 1553; and German editions from 1546.

== "Materia non medica" ==
The ancient phrase survives in modified form in the British Medical Journal's long-established "Materia Non Medica" column, the title indicating non-medical material that doctors wished to report from their travels and other experiences. For example, in June 1977, the journal contained "Materia Non Medica" reports on an exhibition at the Whitechapel Art Gallery by a London physician, the making of matches by hand in an Indian village by a missionary general practitioner, and a cruise to Jamaica by a University of the West Indies lecturer in medicine.

== See also ==
- Alterative
- Herbal
- Homeopathic Materia Medica
- Physic garden
