= Andrés Laguna =

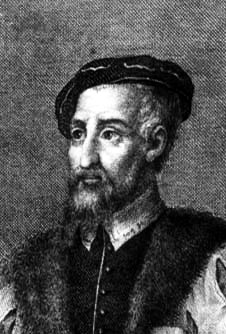
- Andrés Laguna
- Born: 1499; Segovia
- Died: 1559 (aged 59–60); Guadalajara
- Scientific career
- Fields: botany pharmacologist

Andrés Laguna de Segovia (1499–1559) was a Spanish humanist physician, pharmacologist, and botanist.

== Biography ==
Laguna was born in Segovia, according to Diego de Colmenares and other historians, to a converted Jewish doctor. He studied the arts for two years in Salamanca, then moved to Paris in 1530, where he graduated from the arts and went on to study medicine. He also learned classical languages such as Greek and Latin with such fluency as to be able to read Dioscorides in his original language. He was also influenced by Erasmus. Laguna returned to Spain in 1536, then travelled to England, lived some years in the Netherlands and collected herbal remedies in all the places he stayed to verify Dioscorides' prescriptions. Between 1540 and 1545 he resided in Metz, becoming a doctor of the city, and from 1545 to 1554 he stayed in Italy, where he received a doctorate from the University of Bologne and was honored by the Popes Paul III and Julius III, becoming doctor to the latter pontiff. He was provided with accommodations in Venice by the Spanish ambassador, Diego Hurtado de Mendoza, a preeminent humanist and proprietor of a nutritional library. Laguna finally returned to Spain in 1557, after another extended stay in the Netherlands lasting three years; he served as doctor to Charles V and Philip II. Lastly, he created the Botanical Garden of Aranjuez. He died, probably in Guadalajara, Spain, in 1559. His remains were interred in the church of San Miguel, in Segovia.

== Work ==
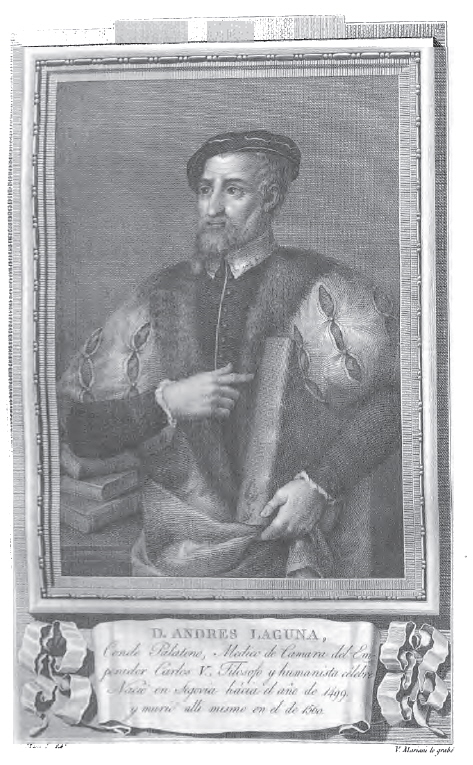
Andrés Laguna, in a portrait of the 18th century.

Laguna worked on literary, historical, philosophical, political (Europe the Self-Tormentor, that is to say, she miserably torments herself and laments her own disgrace) and medical subjects, as a typical homo universalis of the Renaissance. His most celebrated work is the translation into Castilian, with interesting commentaries and additions that double the original text, of Dioscorides's Materia Medica. His primary source was the edition translated to Latin by Ruelle and printed in Alcala in 1518 under supervision of Antonio de Nebrija, but also Ruelle's own classes, which he attended during his stay in Paris between 1530 and 1536. The work was published with the title Annotations on Dioscorides of Anazarbus (Lyon, 1554). He also indicates, in his translation, the errors committed by Ruelle that he noticed when collating the Latin translation with various Greek codices. He finished this annotation in Rome (1553) and one year later, on one of his visits to Venice, he produced a printing of his edition at the same place where P. Andrea Mattioli, the principal distributor of Dioscorides in Europe (he had made a translation to Latin and another to Italian in 1544 that was reprinted seventeen times), produced his own edition. Laguna personally verified all the prescriptions of Dioscorides and added his own observations, opinions and experiences as a botanist and pharmacologist who had experimented with herbs gathered in many areas of Europe and the Mediterranean coast. His translation is clear and precise and the commentaries constitute a primary source, not just for botanical medicine of the period, but for other scientific and technical activities. The text was reprinted in Antwerp in 1555 and was reprinted twenty-two times by the end of the eighteenth century; it was much more influential than other editions of Galen or Theophrastus in the European Renaissance, since the prescriptions of Dioscorides had a more practical nature.

Laguna still considered the theory of the four humors effective, but he showed scepticism with respect to alchemy, rejecting any affirmation that did not have empirical confirmation. In spite of that, he sometimes included non-firsthand information about products from the Americas, like the antisyphilitic guaiacum, in a very confusing form. When he did not draw from a direct source, he appears to draw from the works of Gonzalo Fernández de Oviedo y Valdés.

== List of works ==
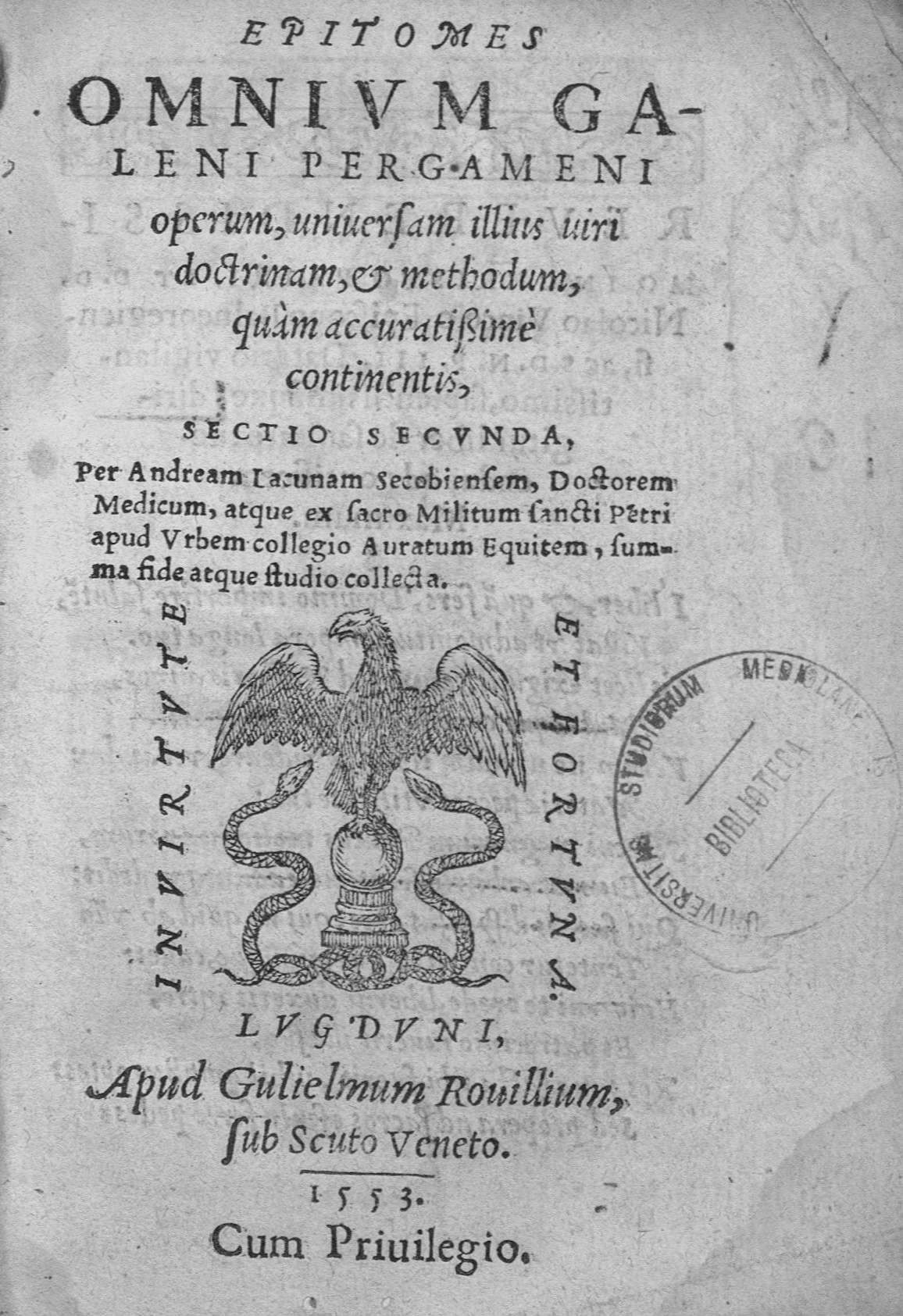
Epitomes omnium Galeni Pergameni operum, 1553

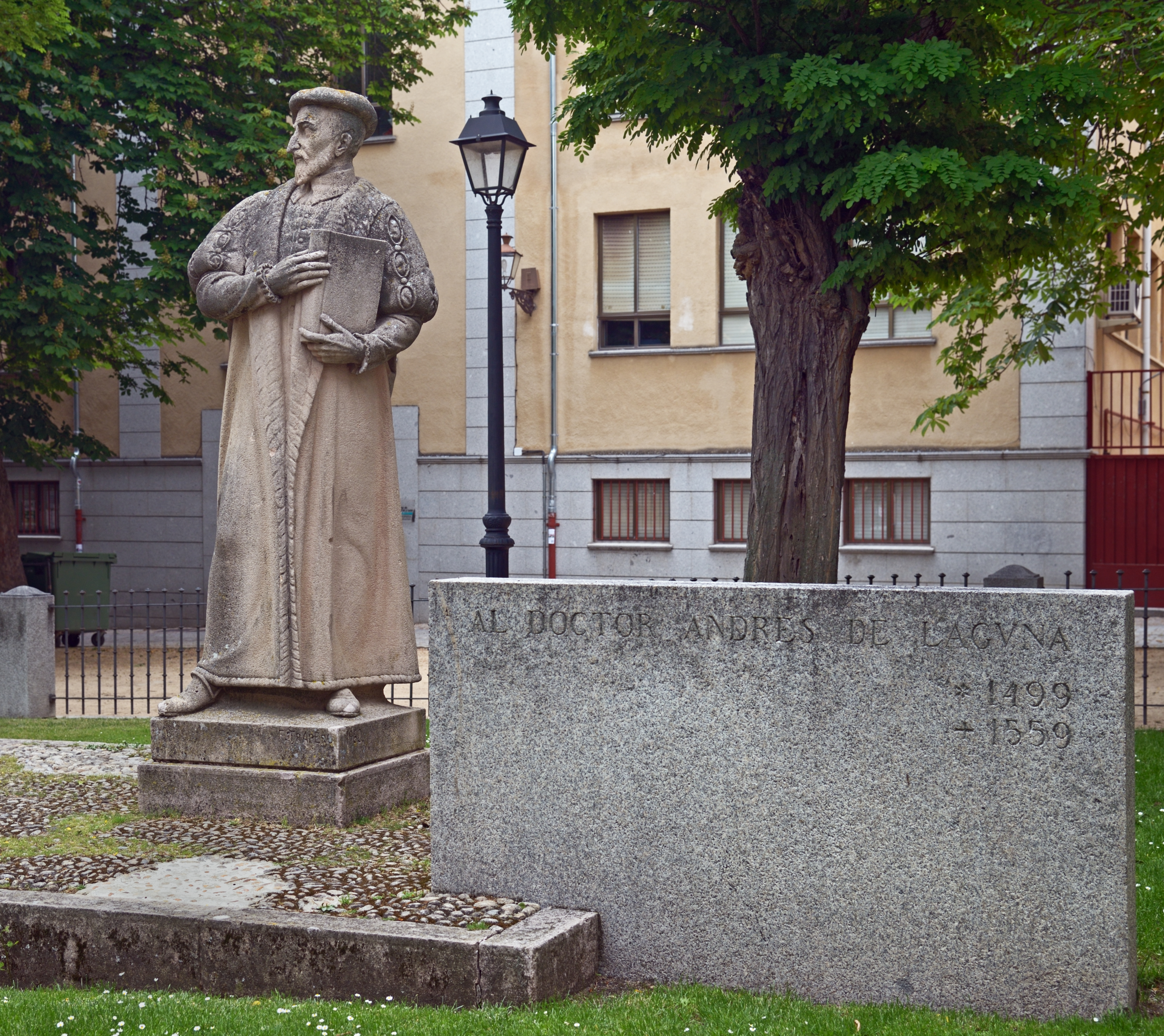
Monument to A.Laguna in Segovia

Laguna did many translations and commentaries, like:

- The Four Most Elegant and Grave Orations of Cicero against Catiline
- Pedanius Dioscorides of Anazarbus (Amberes, 1555), with commentaries duplicating the length of the original and considering other important sciences
- the Dialogues of Lucian of Samosata
- On the Cosmos and On the Virtues of Aristotle
- the Philosophical History of Galen.

His original works include:

- A Brief Discourse on the Cure of and Preservation from the Plague, where he affirms that "there is no instrument more apt than the doctor to introduce the plague throughout every region" and proposed the formation of a medical body specializing in this disease. Andrés Laguna had treated plague patients in the Duchy of Lorena with an infusion made with white chameleon, although he also recommended black chameleon. He also recommended the application of a saline solution of milk, salt-water and vinegar on an empty stomach and prohibited hot baths; he practiced bloodletting as well as the use of gems and precious stones.
- the Anatomical Method
- On the Life of Galen
- a Treatise on Medicinal Weights and Measures
- Alphabet of Doctrines or Statements of Galen on Hippocrates
- Europe the Self-Tormentor, that is to say, she miserably torments herself and laments her own disgrace, a discourse published in 1543, a few days after its reading, in the College of Arts in Cologne, on the press of Johann von Aachen (Cologne). The author forgot this famous oration and didn't return to revise it, but it looks forward to Montaigne, Descartes, Montesquieu and Voltaire in forging the modern idea of European civilization as opposed to barbarism: religious neutrality, secularization of law and public affairs, equal social, moral, and personal principles, etc... It is a pacifist discourse in the style of the Querela pacis of Erasmus of Rotterdam.
- Marcel Bataillon believed Laguna was the author of Travels in Turkey (1557), a work also attributed to Cristóbal de Villalón, Francisco Delicado or Juan de Ulloa Pereira, in the form of a dialogue that relates the customs of the Turks in the age of Suleyman the Magnificent, and allows the author to criticize contemporary customs after the manner of Erasmus.

He published more than thirty works in all.

== Notes and references ==
- Puigvert, A (March 1979). "Andres Laguna (1494--1560)". Investigative Urology. 16 (5): 408. PMID 372130.
- López-Muñoz, Francisco; Alamo Cecilio; García-García Pilar (2007). ""Than all the herbs described by Dioscorides...": the traces of Andrés Laguna in the works of Cervantes". Pharmacy in History. 49 (3): 87–108. PMID 18548904.
- Puigvert, A (1979). "[Andrés Laguna 1494-1560]". Actas urologicas españolas. 3 (1): 1–4. PMID 377921.
- DE LA PENA, A (January 1963). "Two great physicians of the sixteenth century. (Andres LAGUNA)". The Journal of the International College of Surgeons. 2: 15–8. PMID 14025846.
