= Alterative =

Alterative is a former categorisation of materia medica covering various substances, often metals or minerals used in the treatment of chronic conditions to alter the body's metabolic processes. Substances included in this category included iron, mercury, phosphorus, manganese and arsenic, as well as iodine. In modern medicine these are categorised separately according to the biochemical nature of the change they bring about and their categorisation as "alteratives" has become obsolete.
