= Herbarius moguntinus =

Natural history encyclopedia, published in 1484

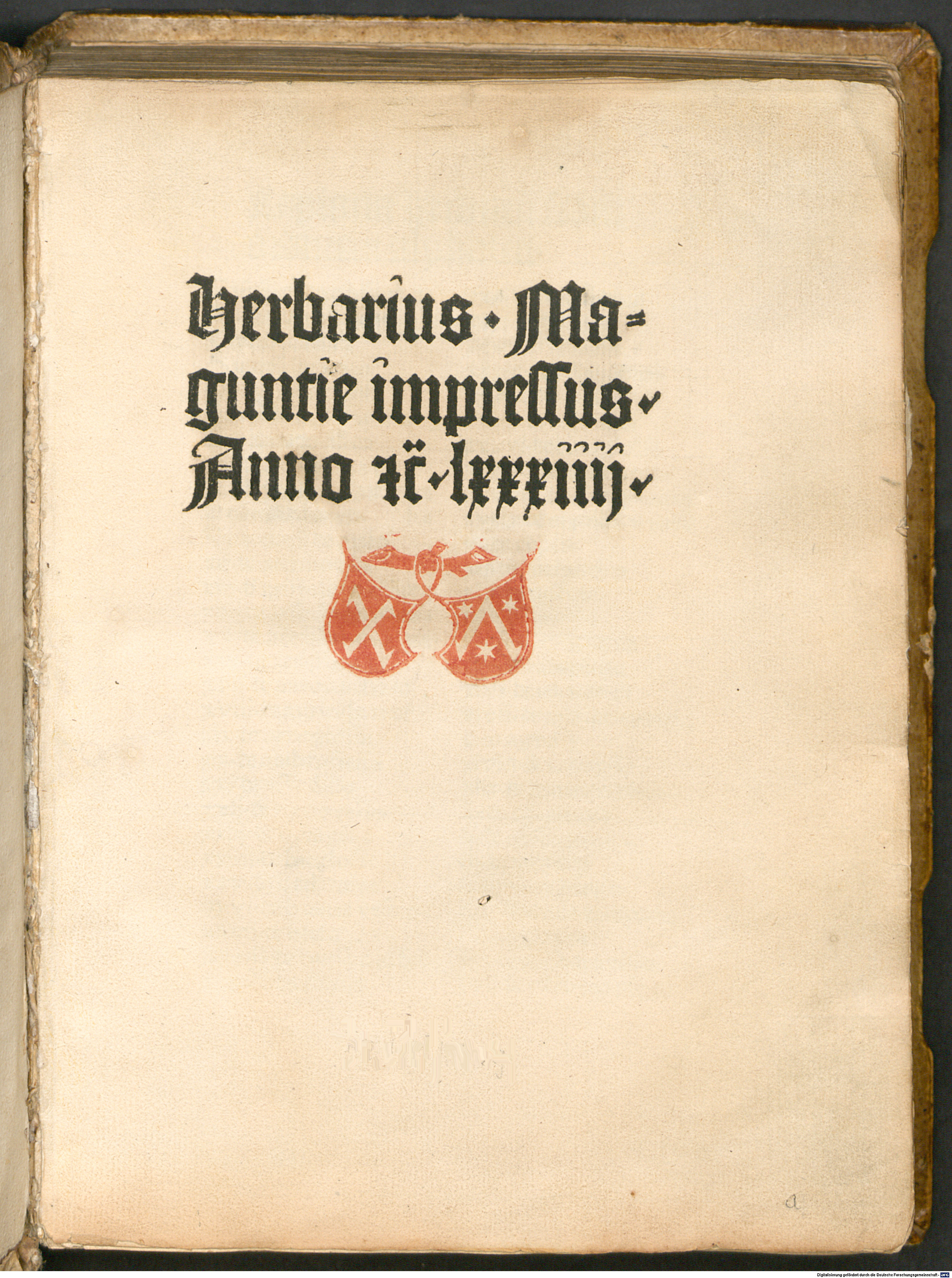
Herbarius moguntinus 1484. Titlepage

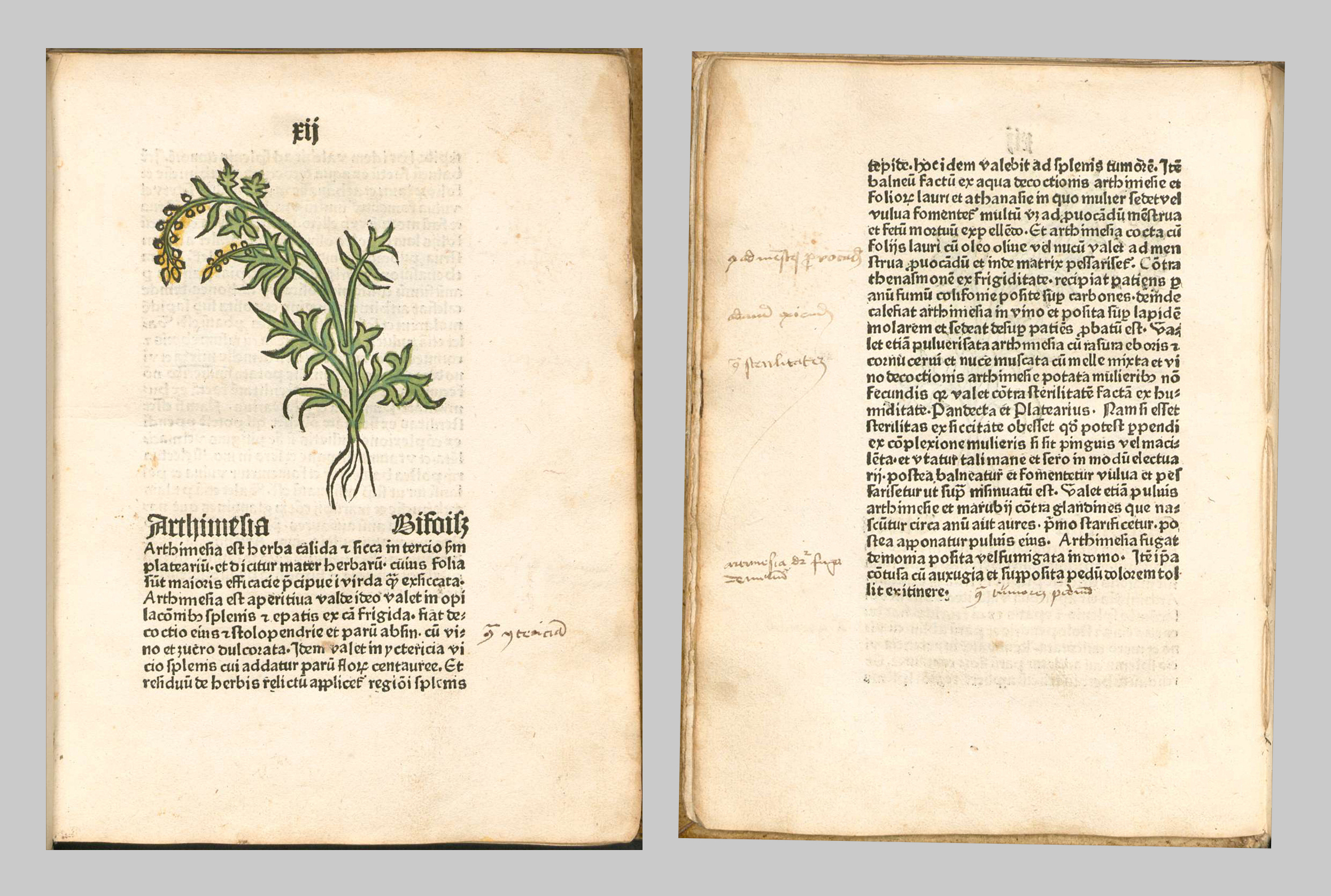
Herbarius moguntinus 1484, chapter XII. Artemisia Bifoiſz. Left: recto. Right: verso

Herbarius moguntinus (Mainzer Herbal Book) or (according to his preface referred to as) Aggregator practicus de simplicibus is an illustrated Latin herbal which was edited and printed in 1484 by Peter Schöffer in Mainz (Latin: moguntia). Together with the German herbal Gart der Gesundheit (Peter Schöffer, Mainz 1485) and the Latin herbal Hortus sanitatis (Jacobus Meydenbach, Mainz 1491), Herbarius moguntinus belongs to the so-called "Group of Mainz Herbal Incunabula."

== Author ==
The author of the book is not known for sure. By misinterpreting the title page of a reprint (Vicenza 1491), the book was wrongly attributed to Arnaldus de Villa Nova. As a possible but not secured author the Frankfurt physician Johann Wonnecke von Kaub is assumed.

== Sources and content ==
As primary sources the author of the Herbarius moguntinus used well-known medieval encyclopaedias, such as the Liber pandectarum medicinae omnia medicine simplicia continens of Matthaeus Silvaticus (14th c.) and the Speculum natural of Vincent of Beauvais (13th century).

The first part of the book consists of 150 chapters, in which plants are described, that grow wild or cultivated North of the Alps. Each chapter in the first part is illustrated by a woodcut of symbolic character. The second part shows 96 other medicines of indigenous and of foreign origin in abbreviated form. Pictures are missing in the second part.

== Woodcuts in the Herbarius moguntinus. Mainz 1484 ==
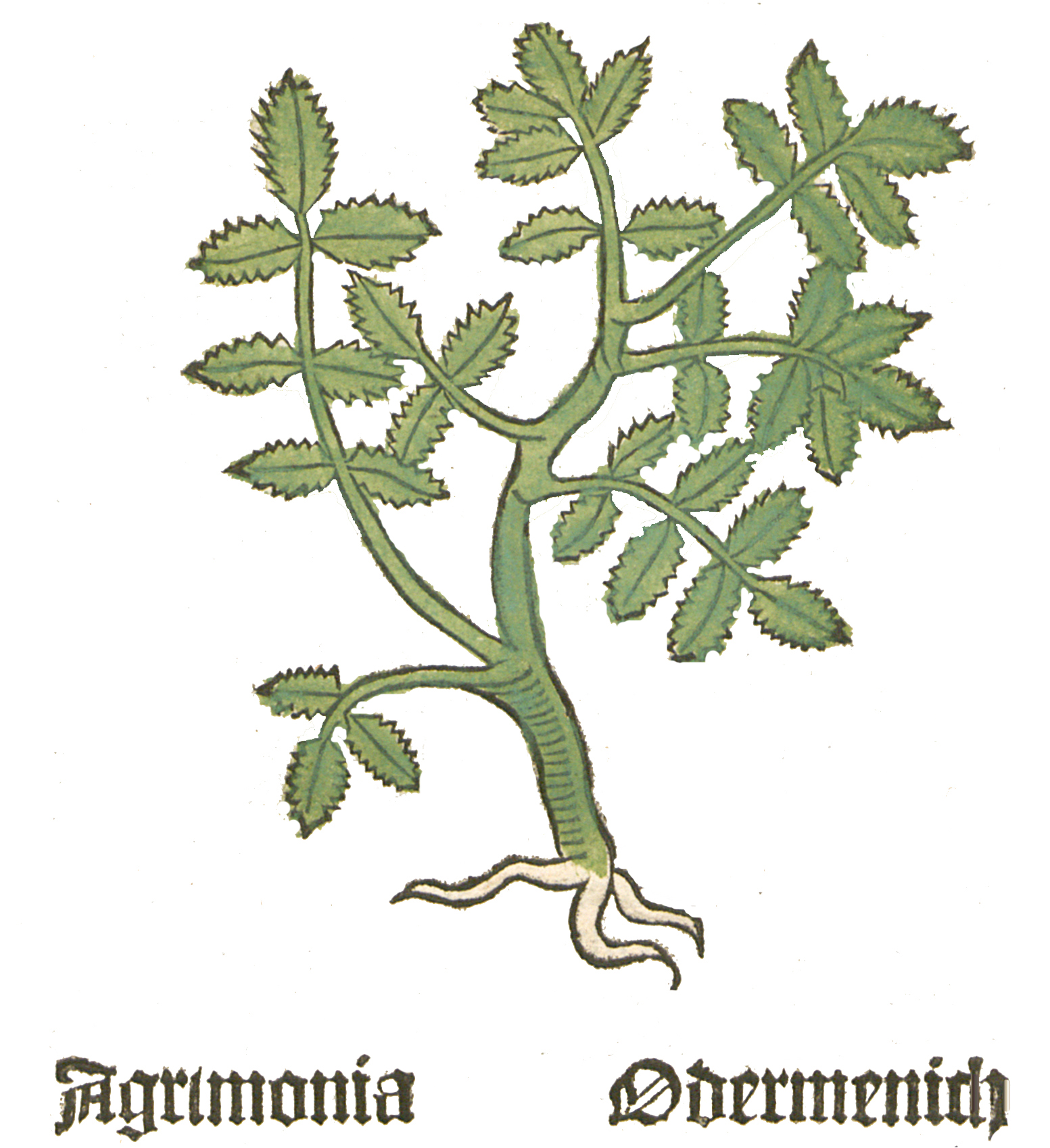
Part I, chapter 6 Agrimonia eupatoria

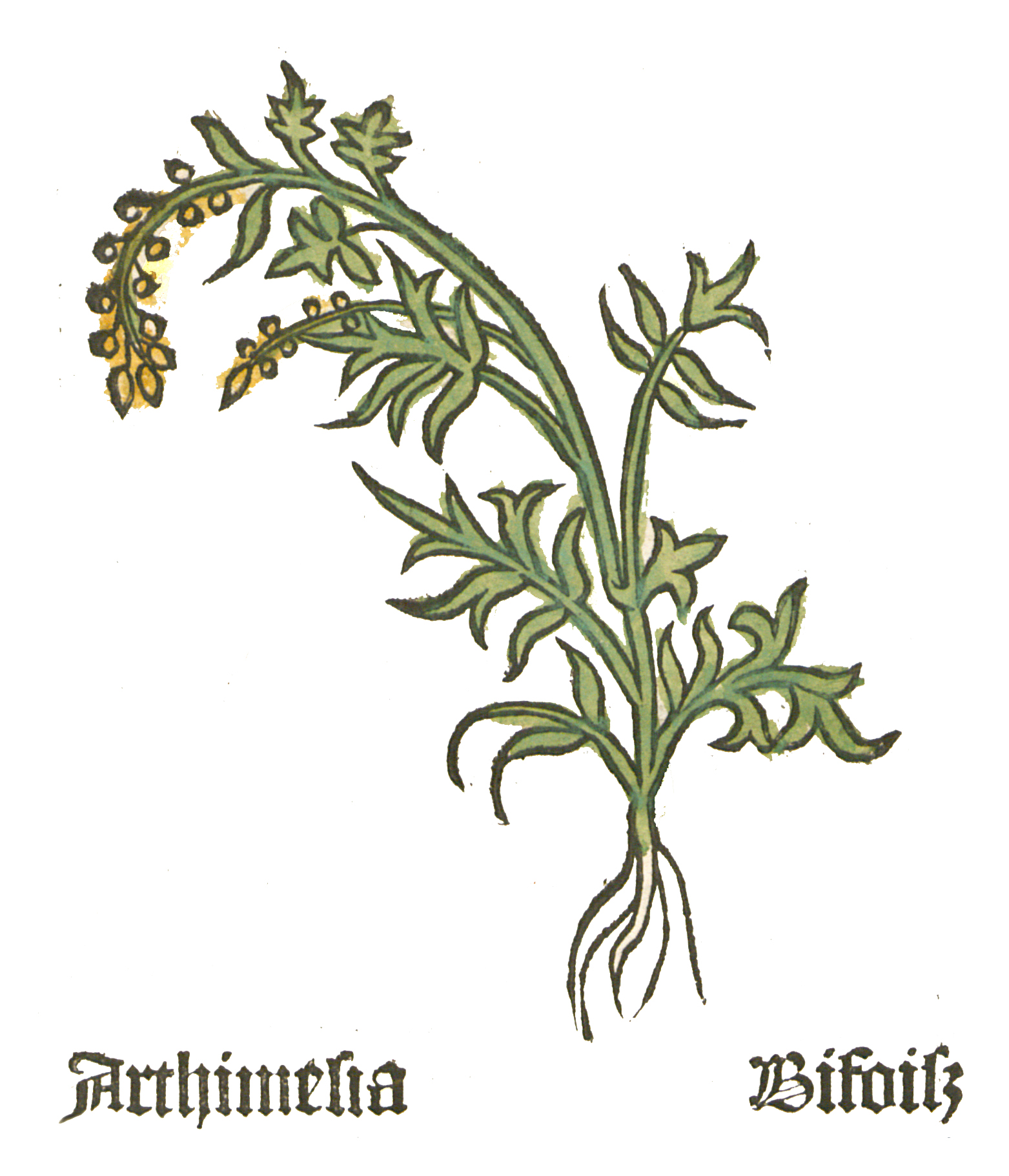
Part I, chapter 12 Artemisia vulgaris

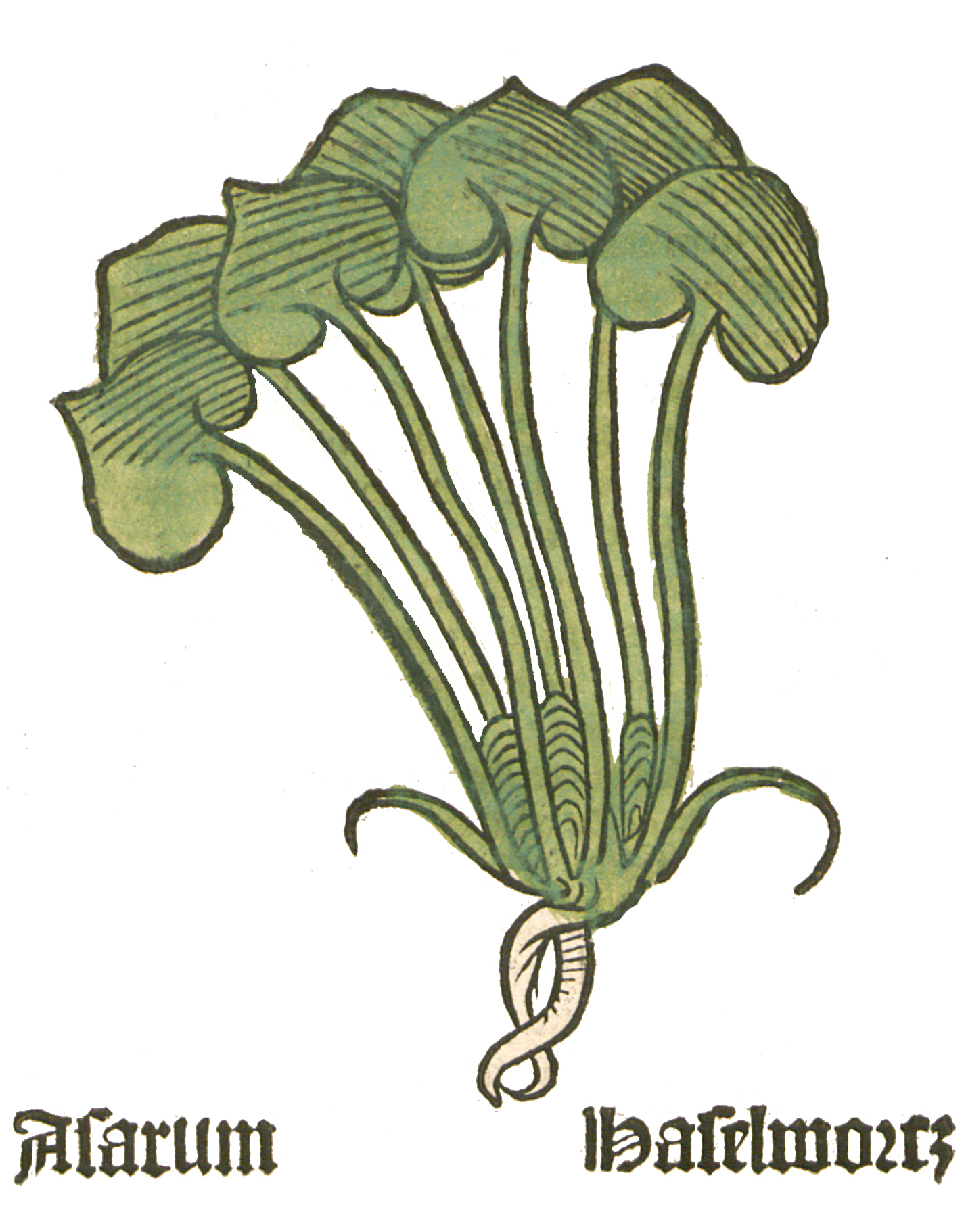
Part I, chapter 15 ... Asarum europaeum

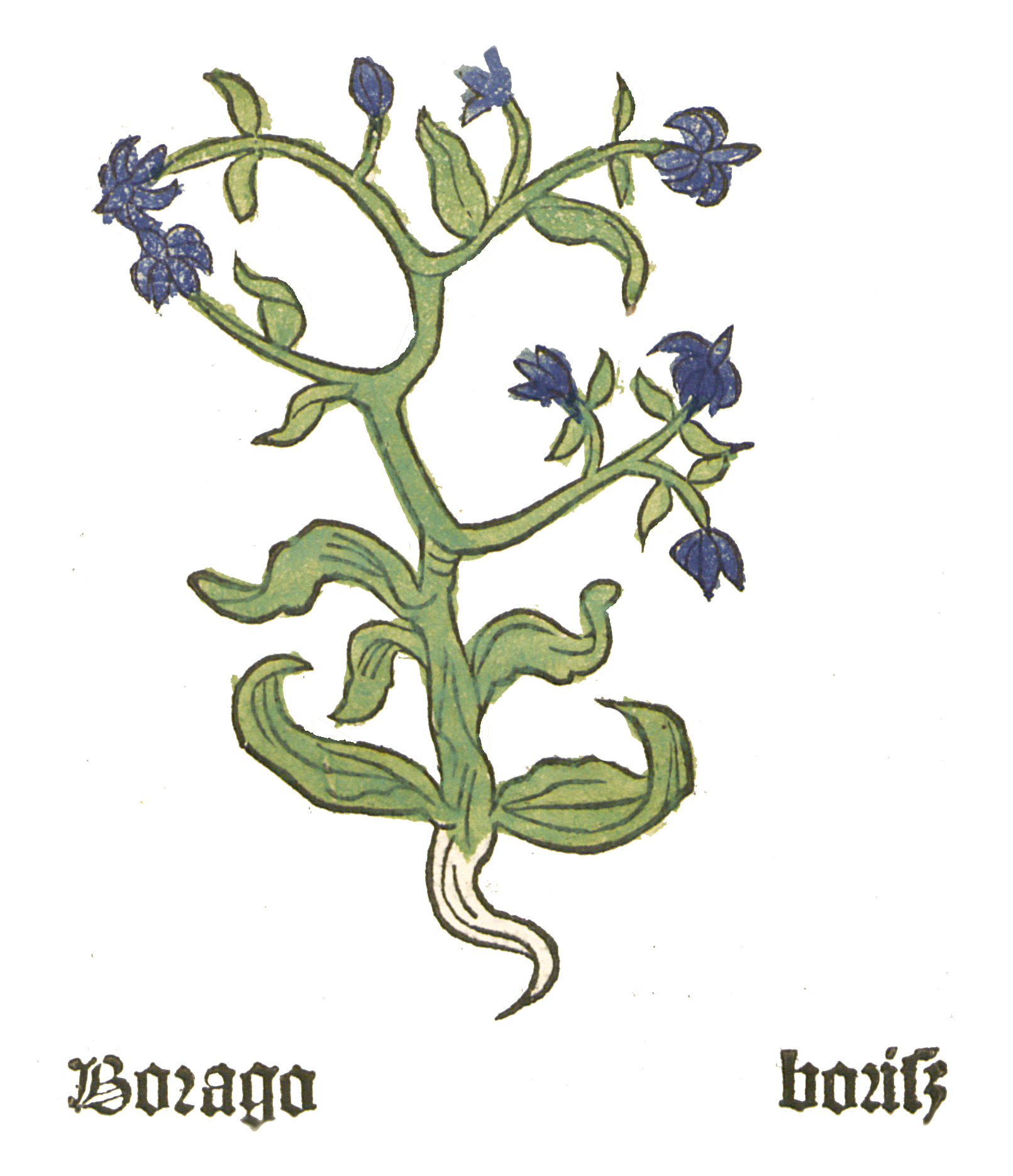
Part I, chapter 23 ... Borago officinalis

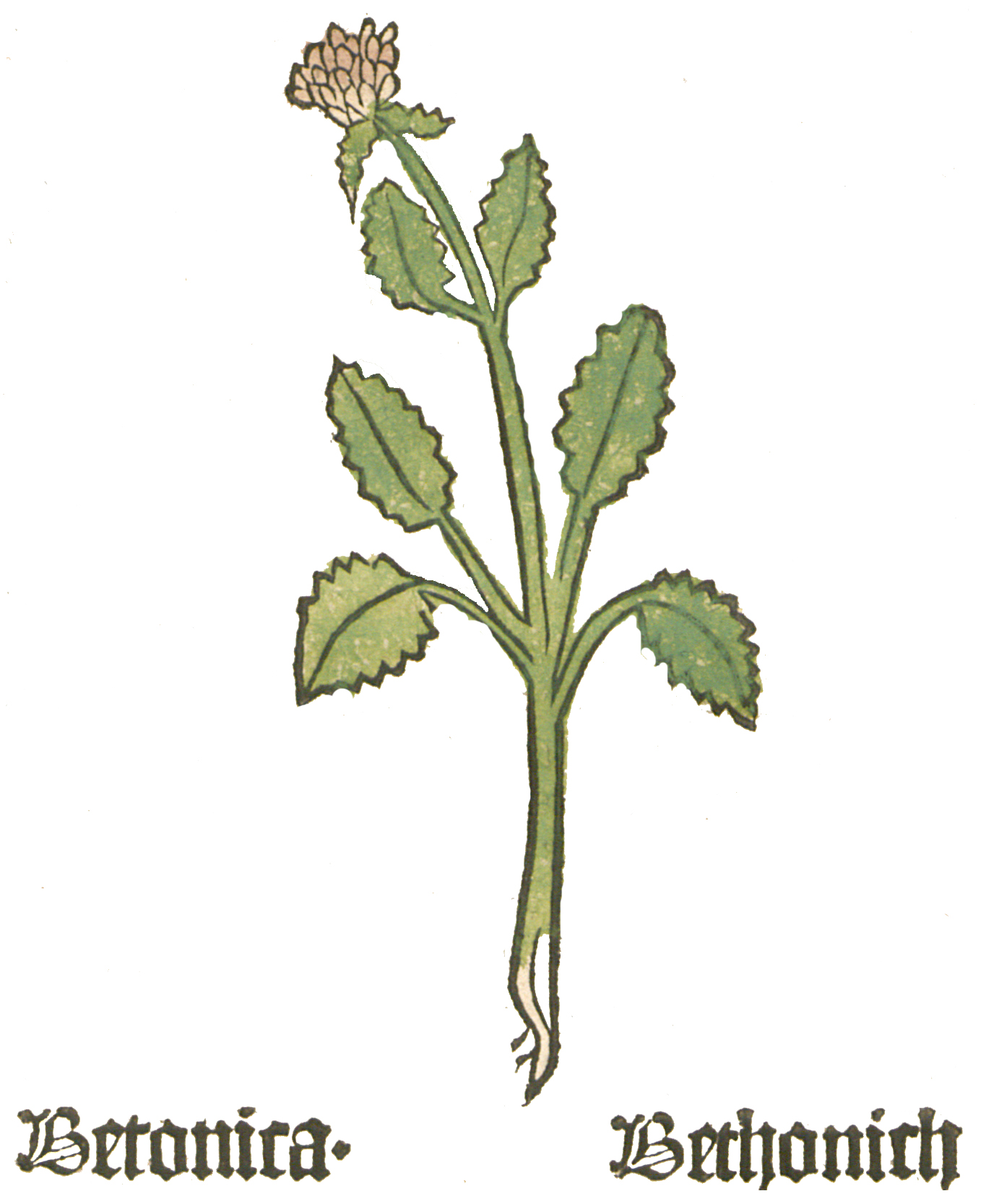
Part I, chapter 25 Betonica officinalis

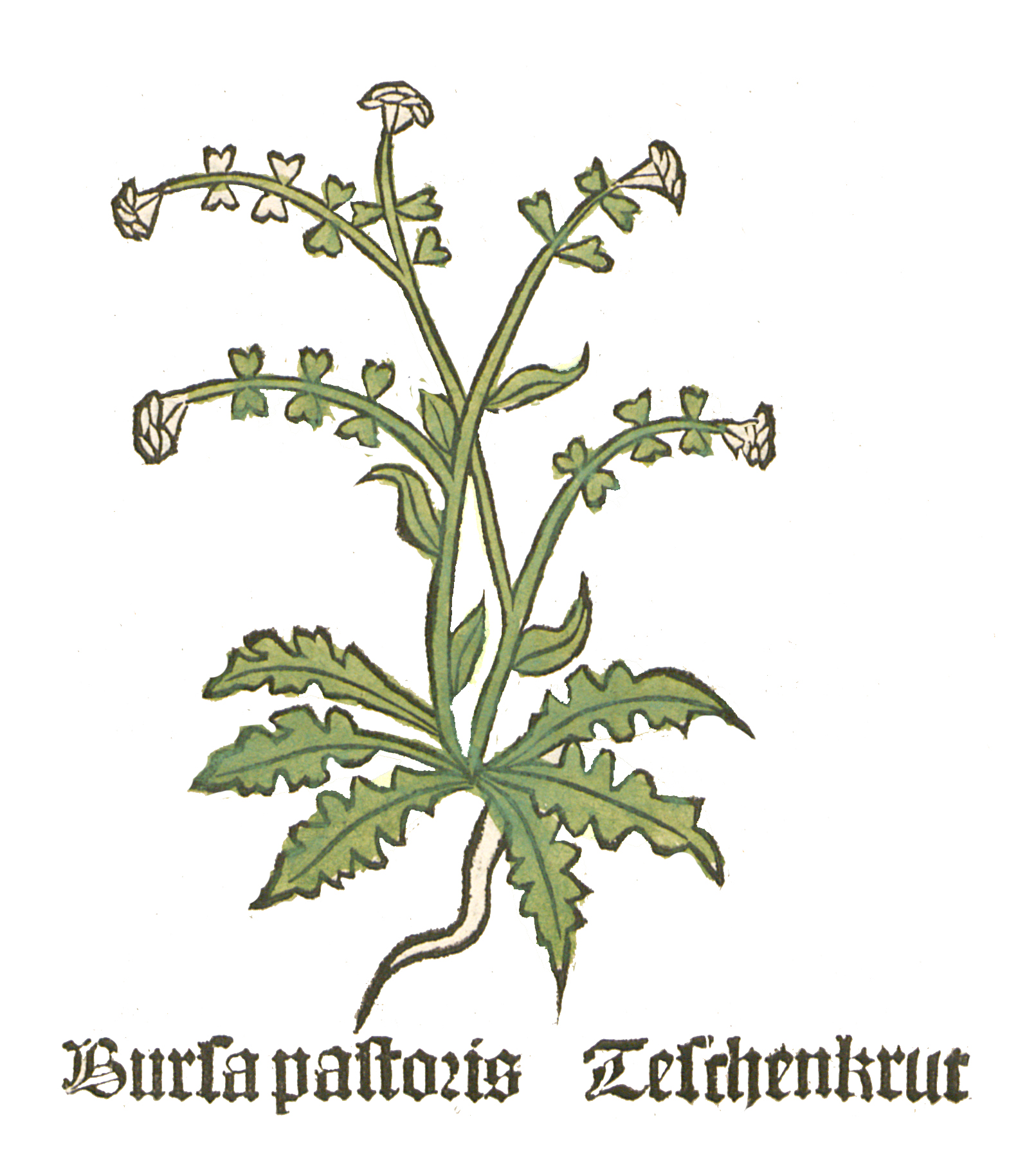
Part I, chapter 28 Capsella bursa-pastoris

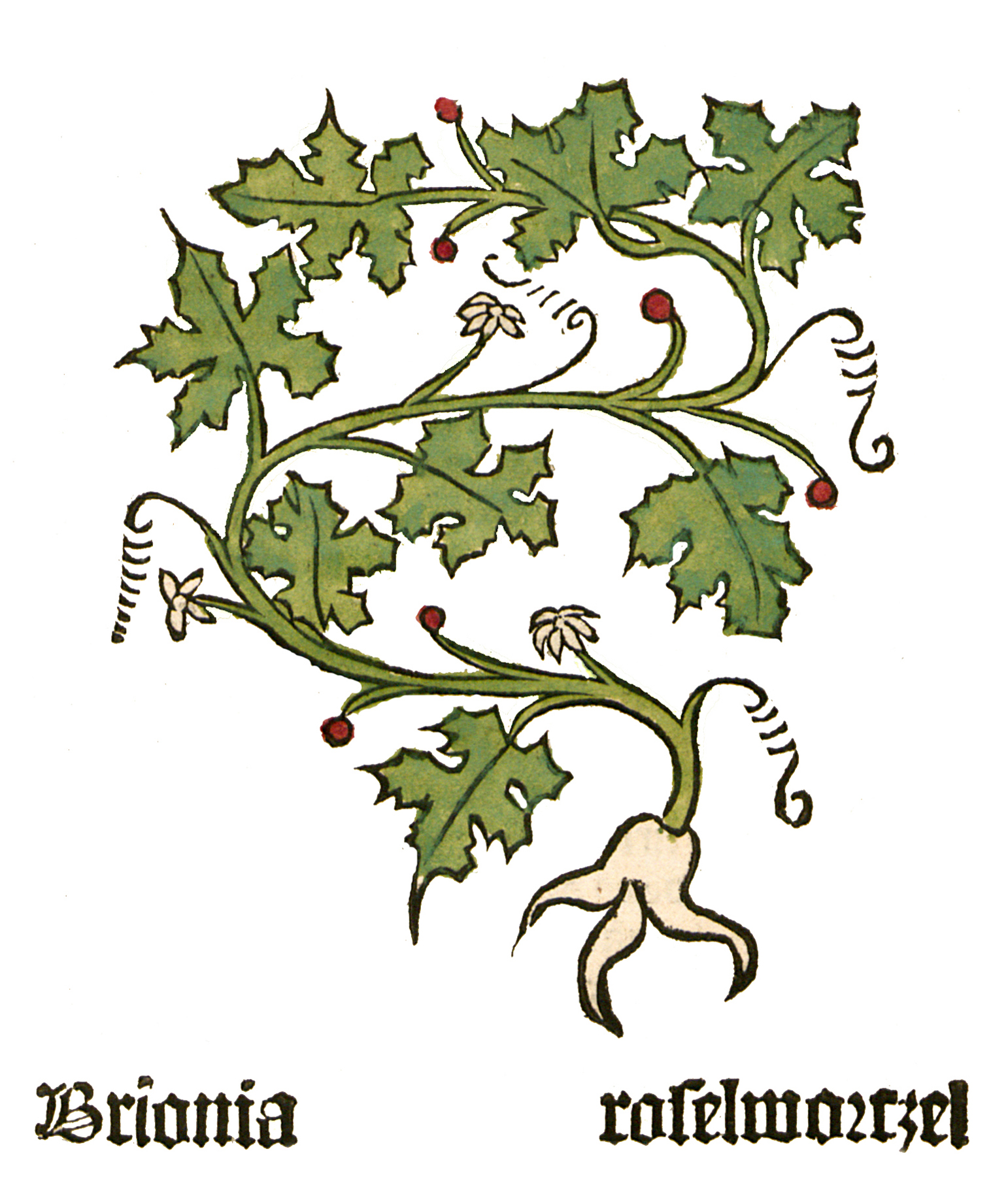
Part I, chapter 31 ... Bryonia dioica

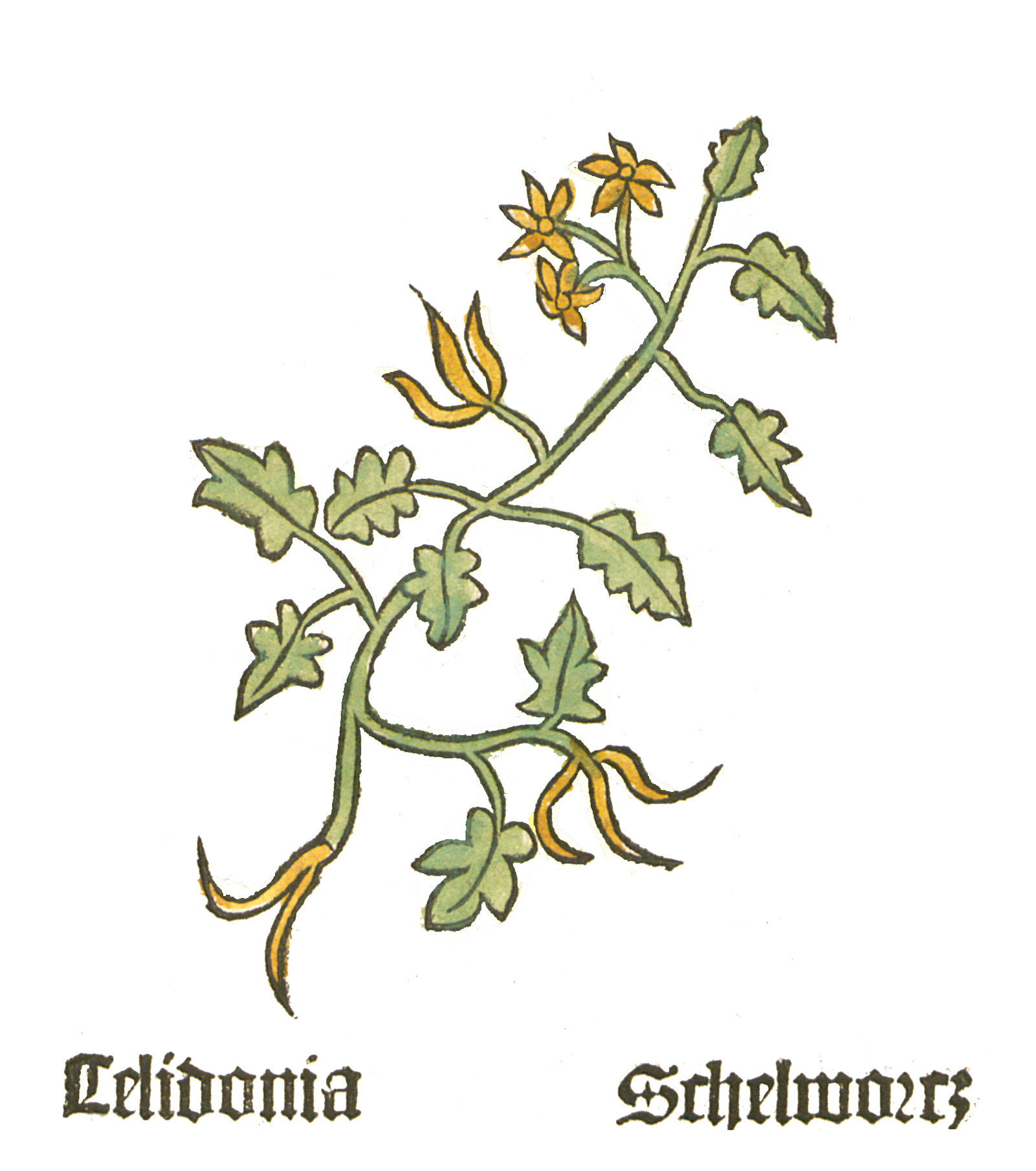
Part I, chapter 44 Chelidonium majus

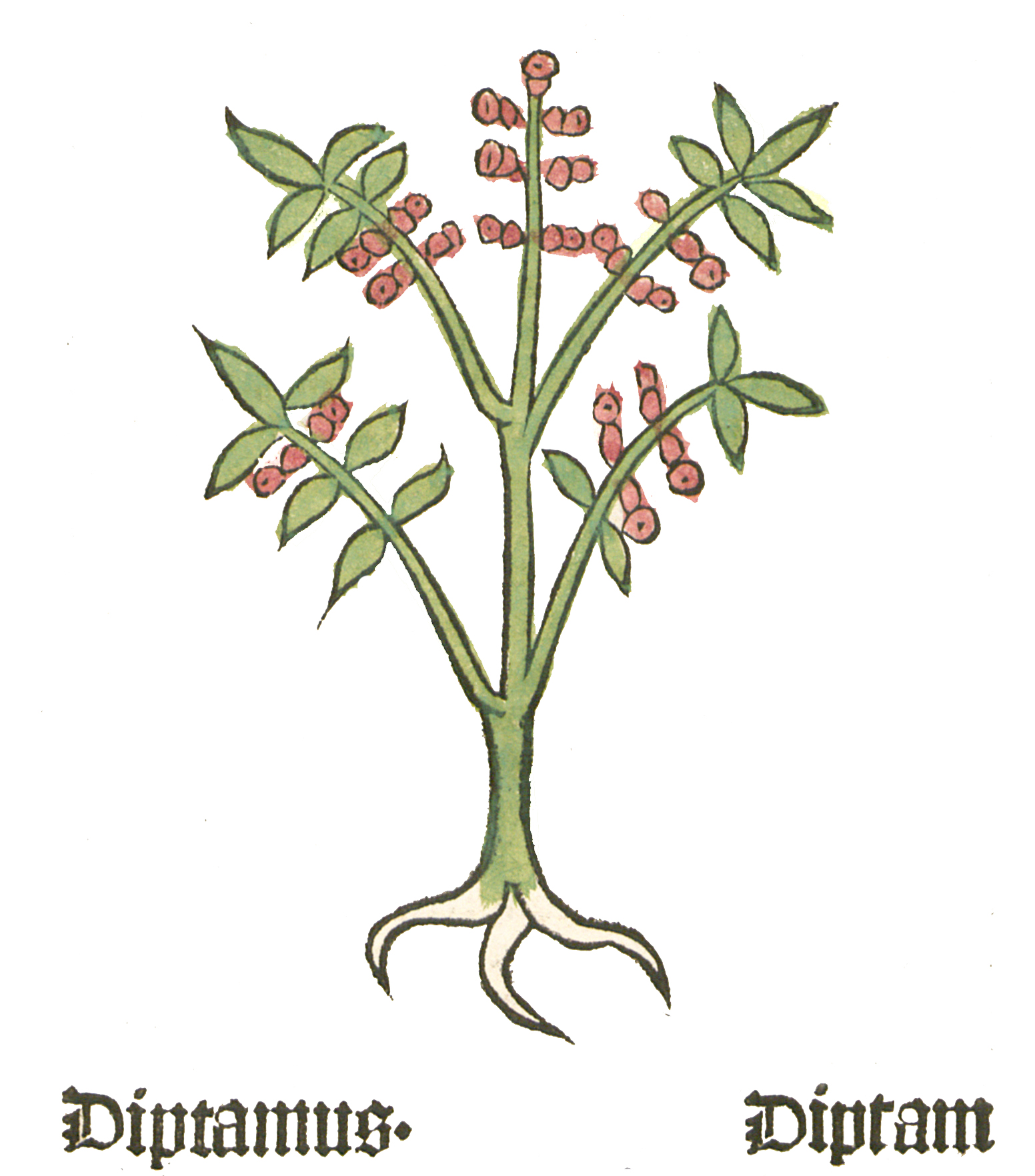
Part I, chapter 50 Dictamnus albus

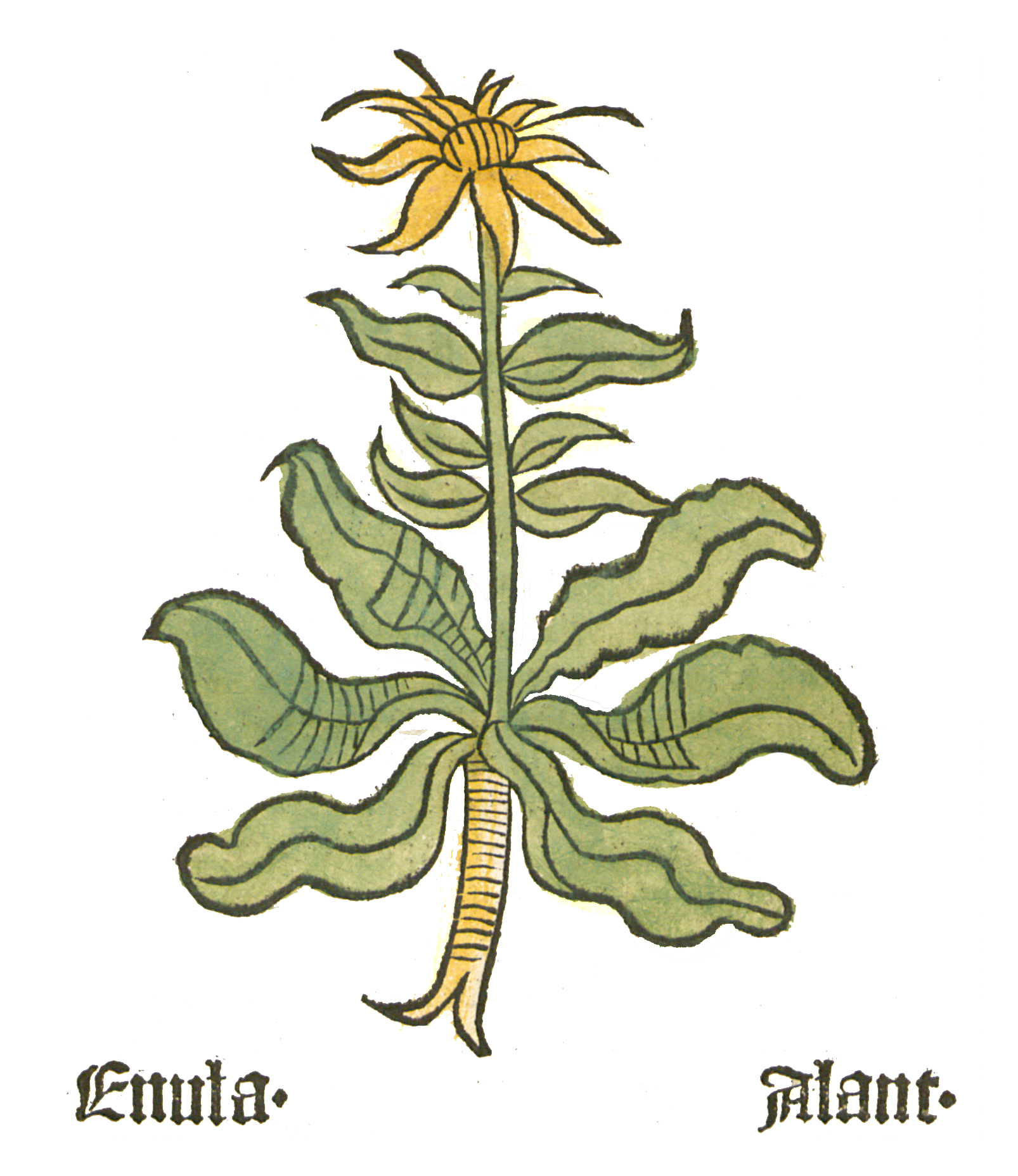
Part I, chapter 54 ..... Inula helenium

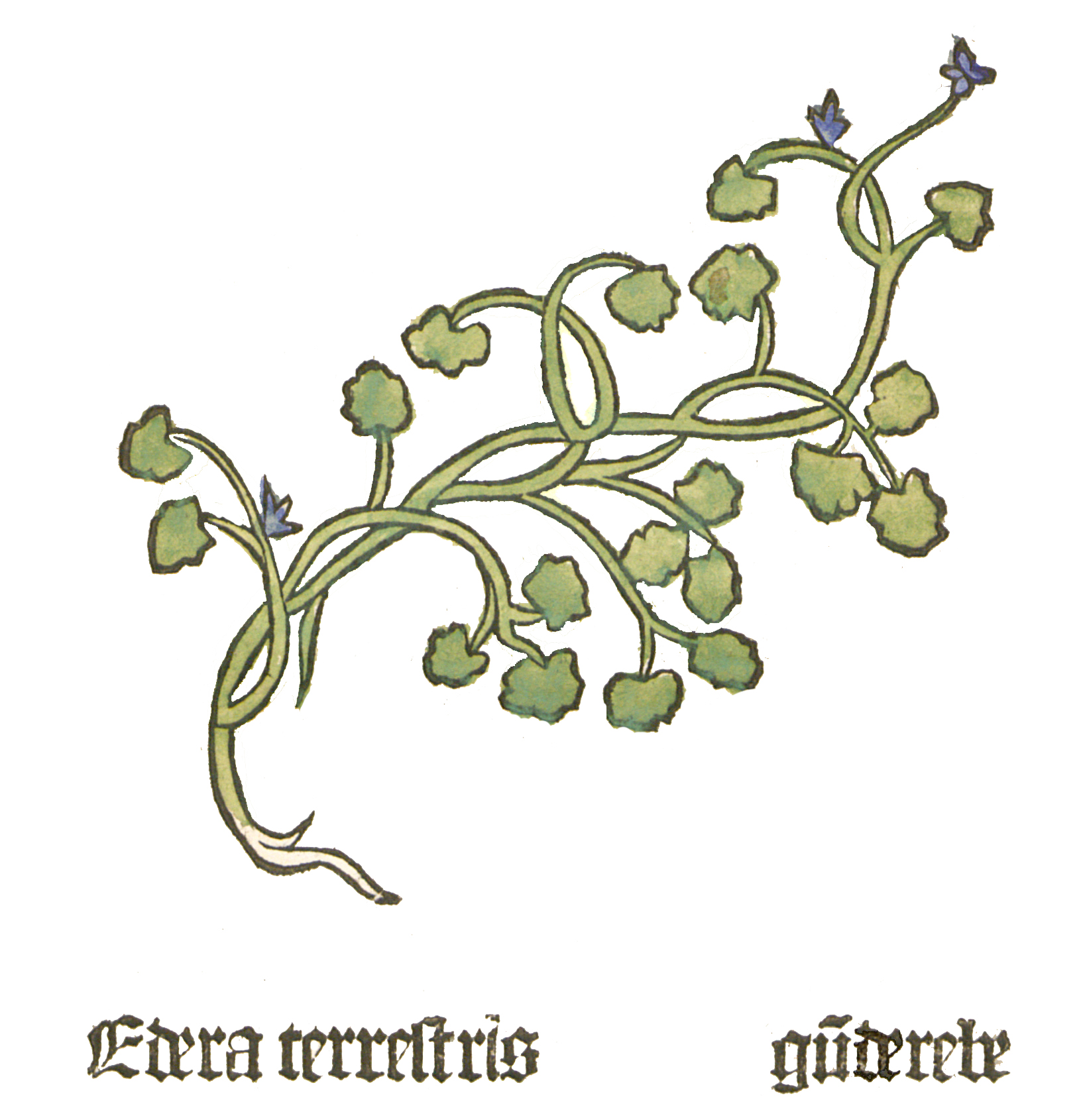
Part I, chapter 59 Glechoma hederacea

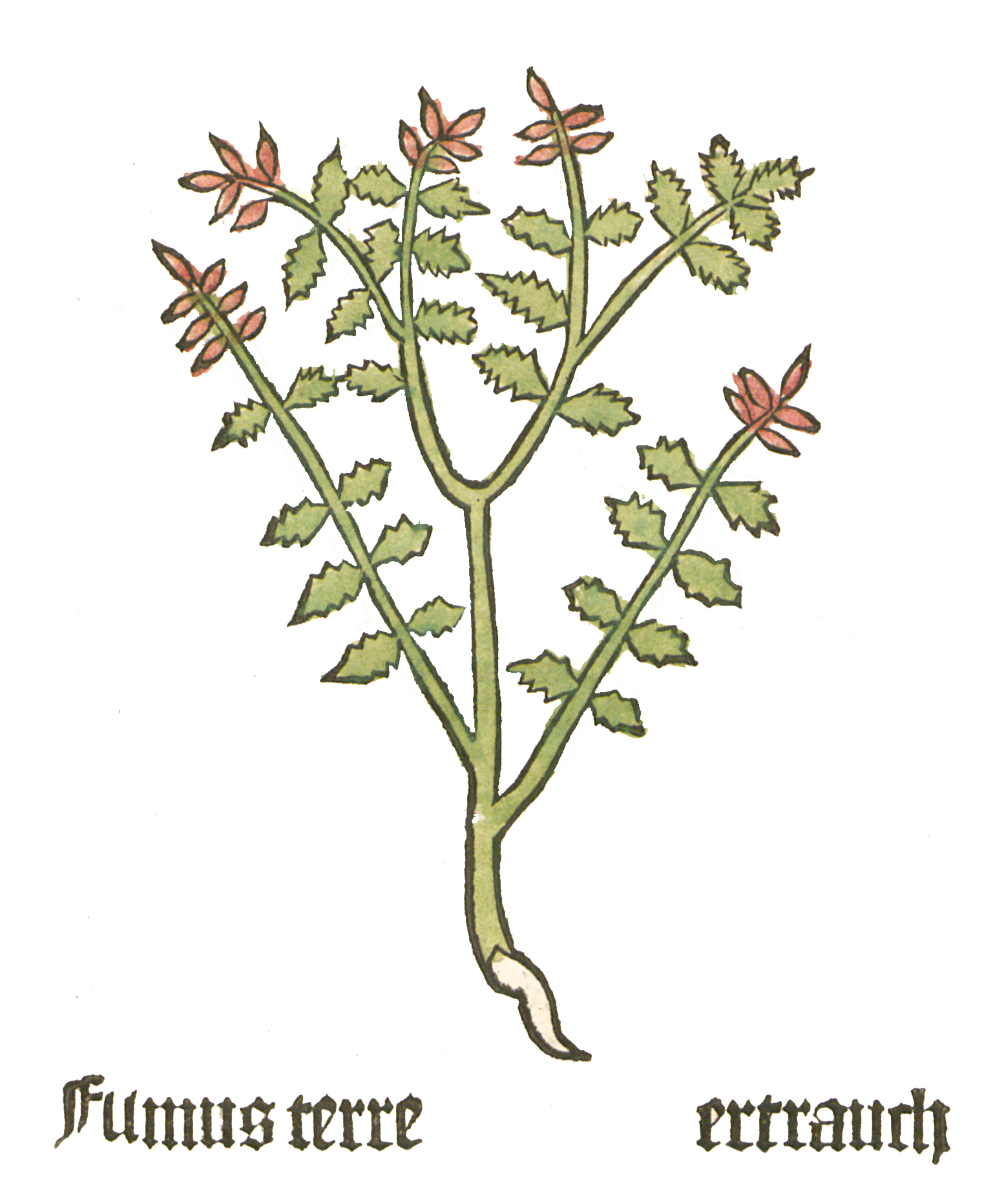
Part I, chapter 61 Fumaria officinalis

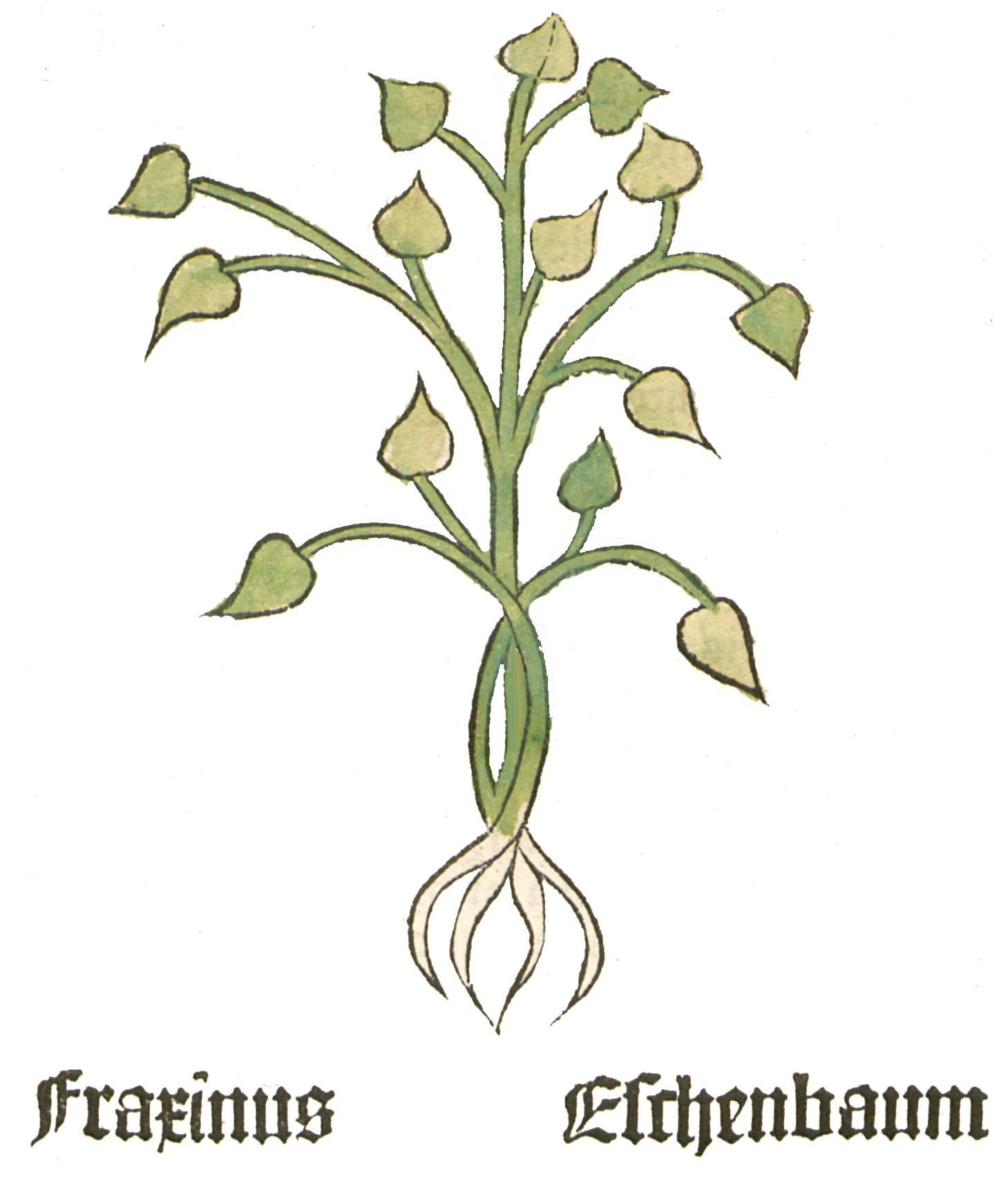
Part I, chapter 64 Fraxinus

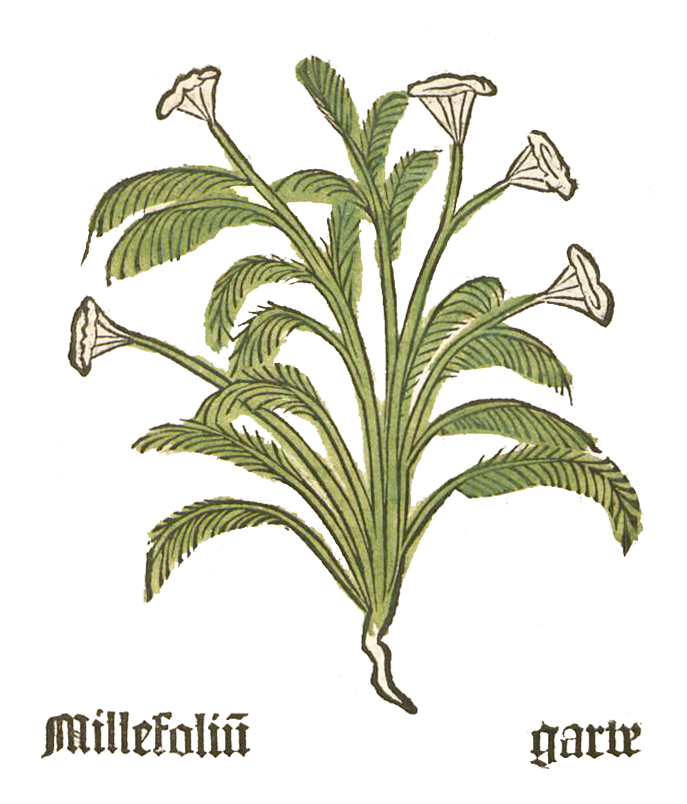
Part I, chapter 85 ... Achillea millefolium

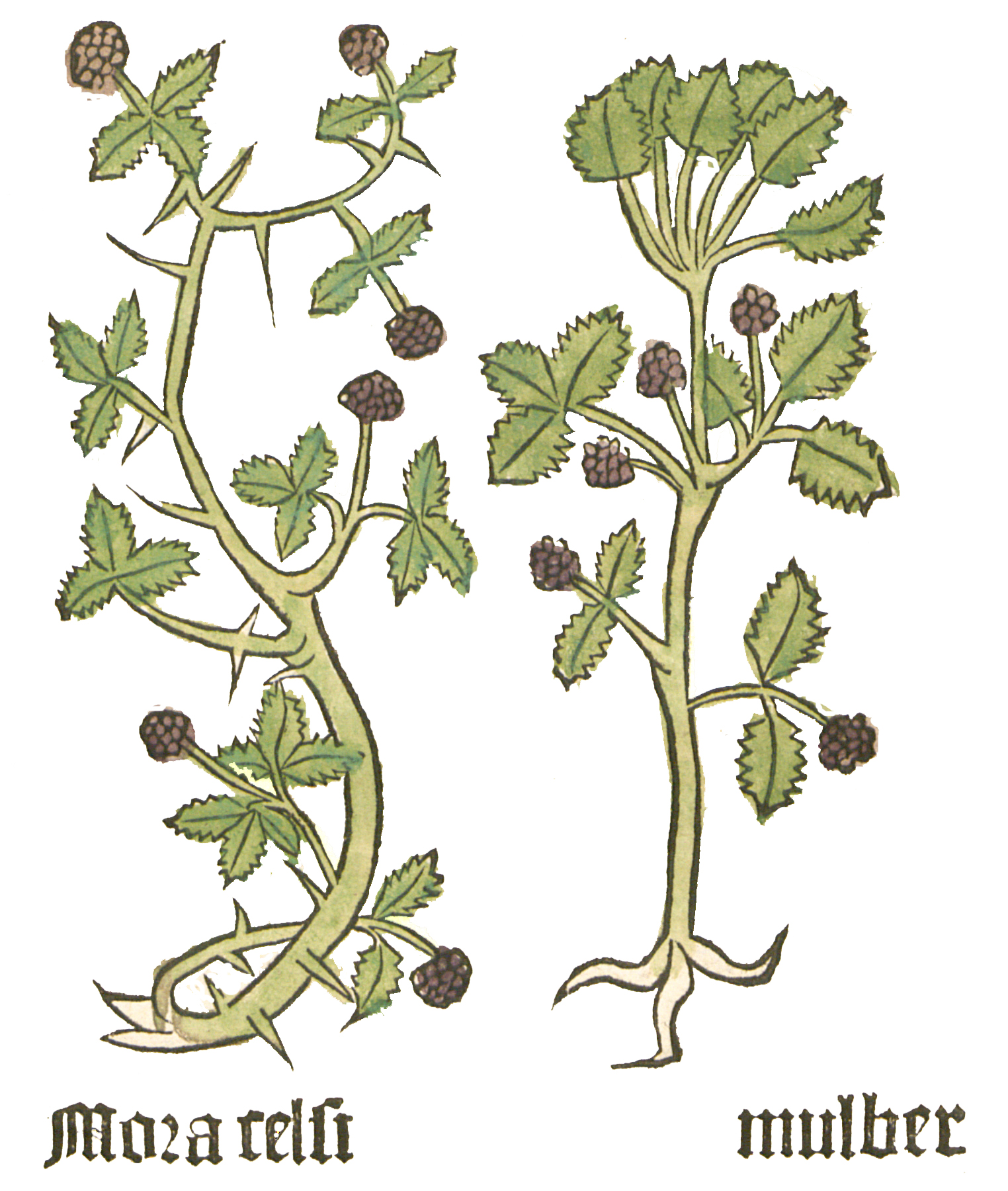
Part I, chapter 92 ... Morus

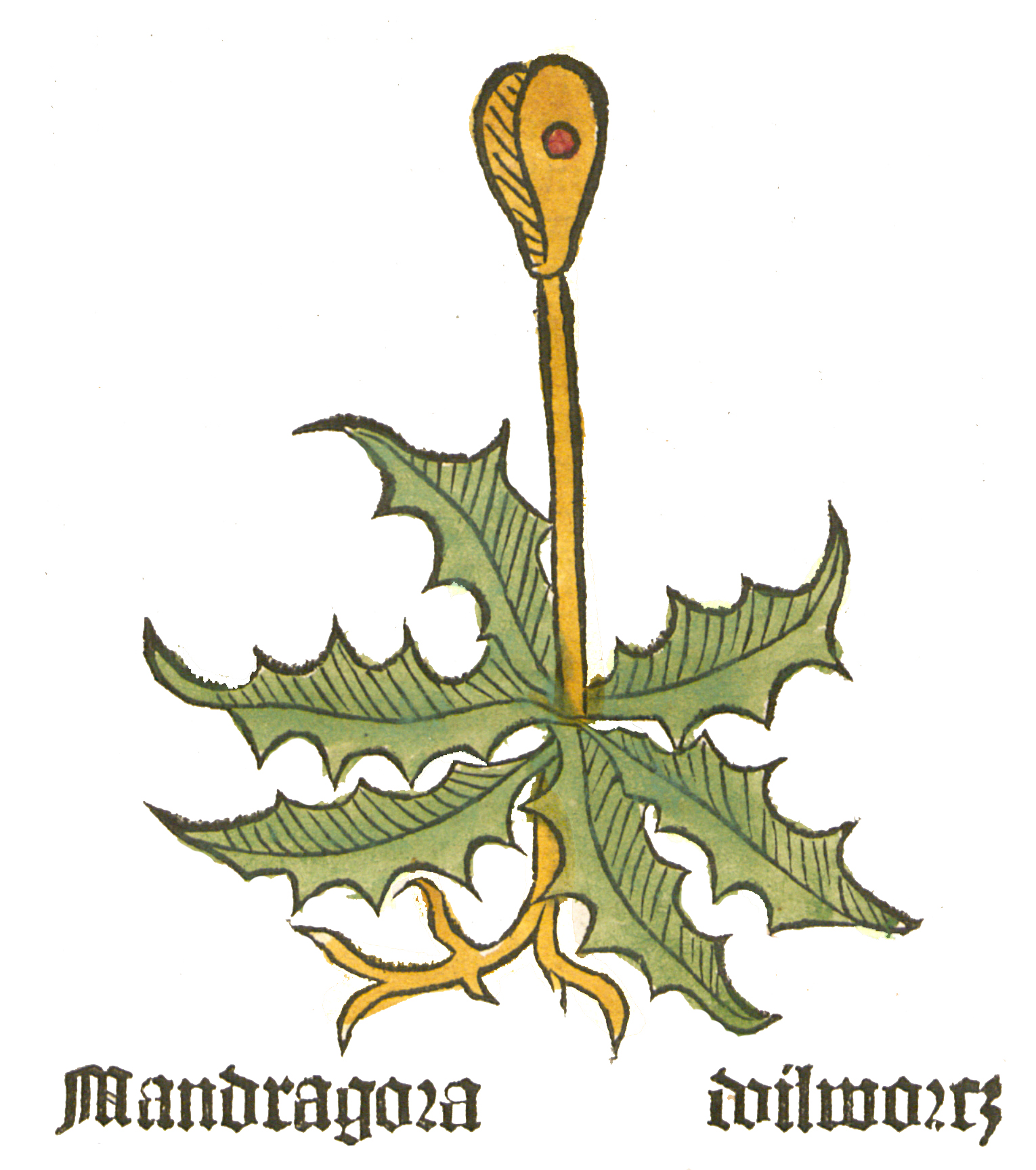
Part I, chapter 94 Mandragora officinarum

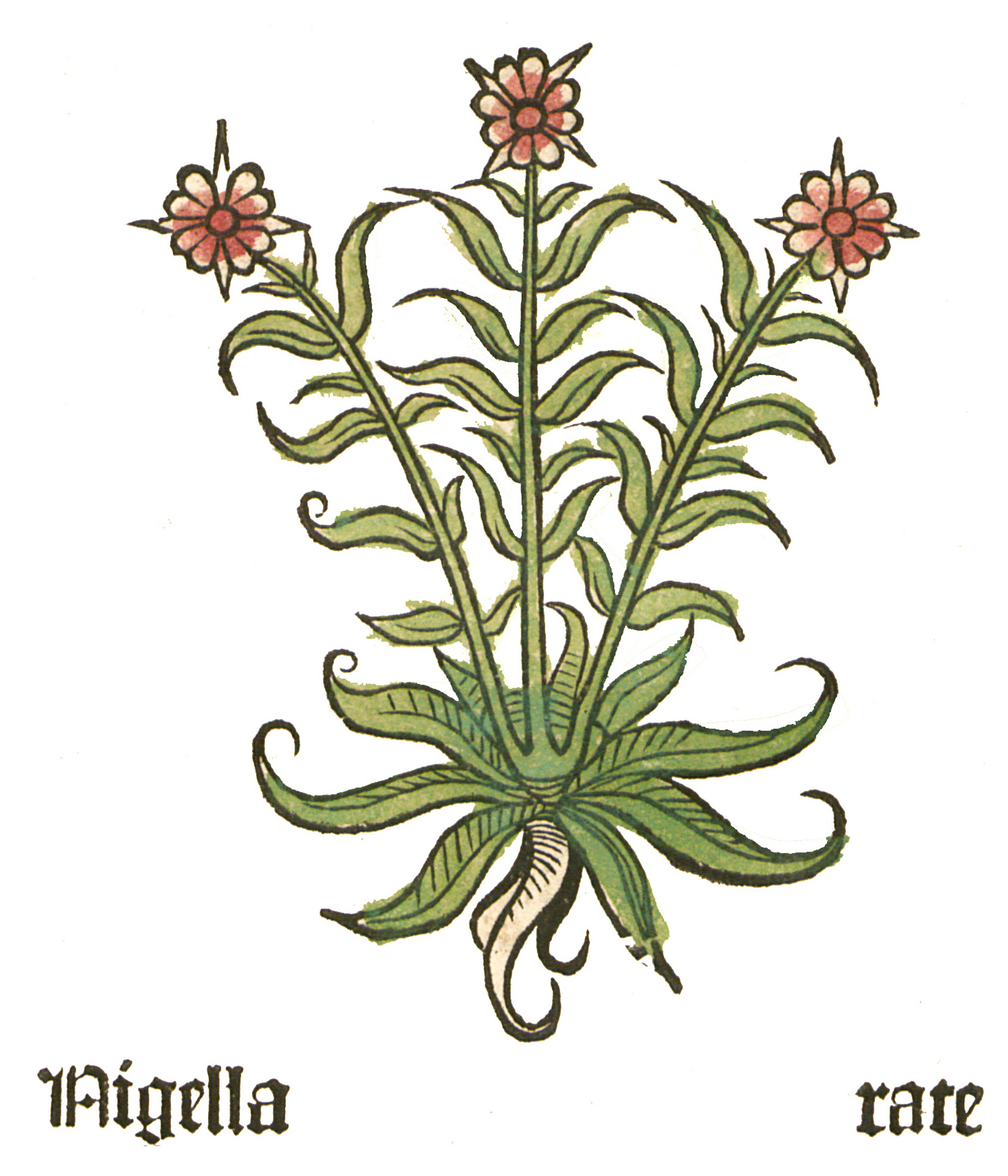
Part I, chapter 97 Agrostemma githago

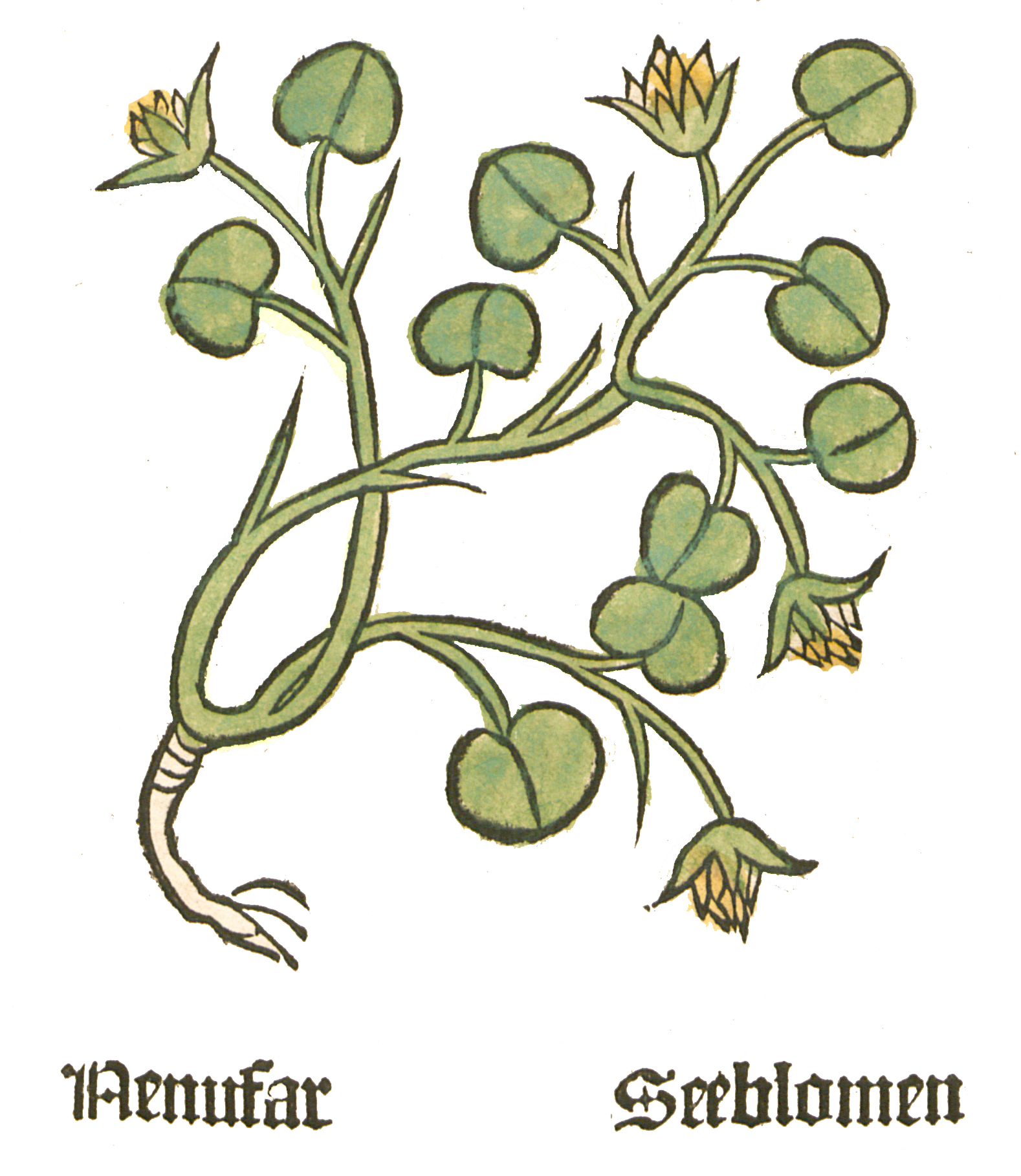
Part I, chapter 98 ... Nuphar lutea

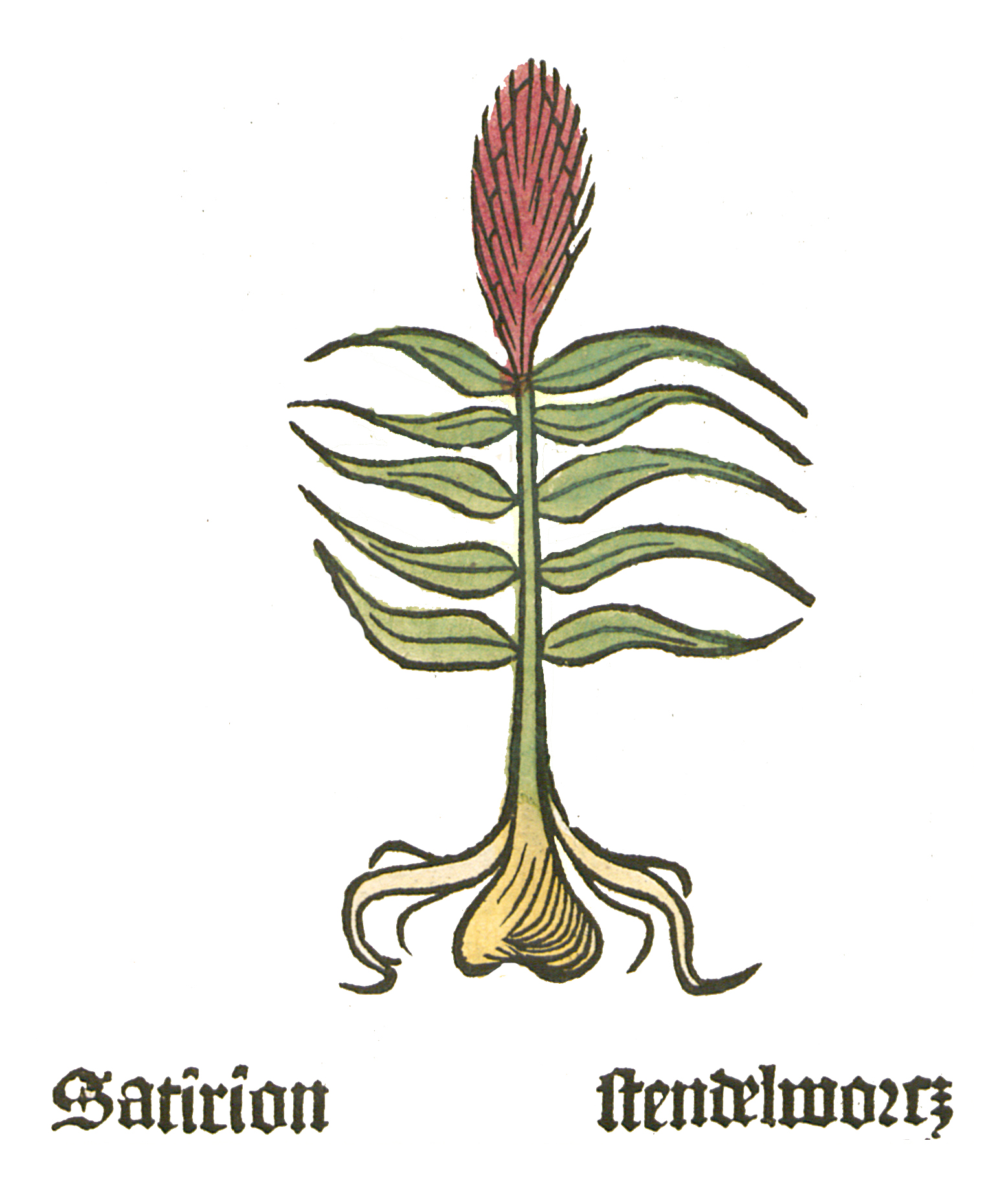
Part I, chapter 128 Orchis

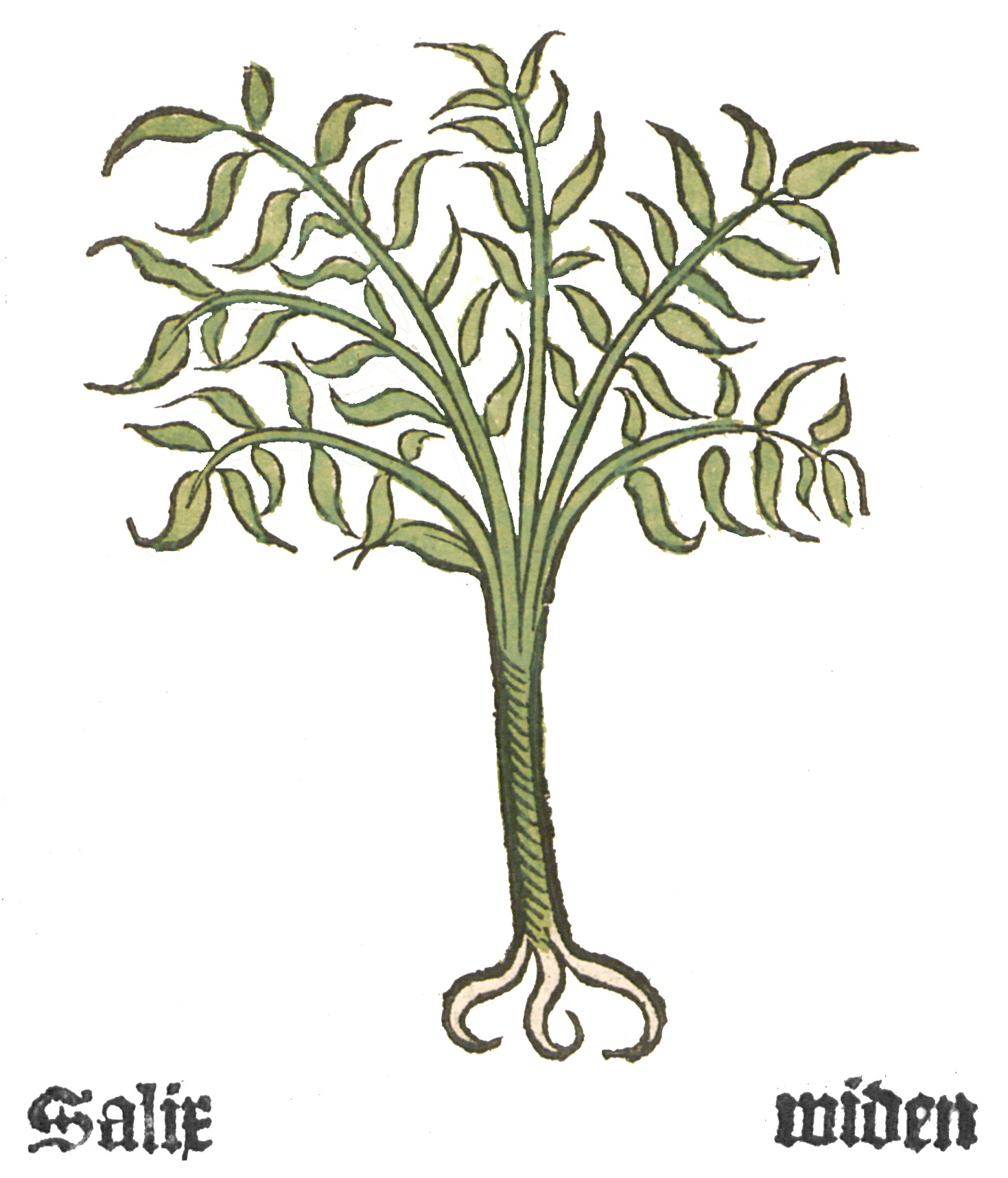
Part I, chapter 136 ... Salix

== Editions and translations ==
- Mainz. Peter Schöffer 1484.
- Speier. Anonymous 1484
- Leuven. Johann Veldener. Herbarius in Dyetsche. 1484.
- Leuven. Johann Veldener 1485-86.
- Leipzig. Markus Brand 1484.
- Passau. Anonymous 1486.
- Passau. Anonymous 1486 (further edition).
- Paris. Anonymous 1486.
- Vicenza. Achates et Gul. Papia 1491.
- Venice. Bevilaqua (Simon Papia) 1499.
- Venice. Francesco Bindoni and Maffeo Pasini. Herbolario volgare. 1536
