= John M. Riddle =

American historian specializing in the history of medicine

John Marion Riddle (born 1937) is an American historian and specialist in the history of medicine. He is Alumni Distinguished Professor emeritus of History at North Carolina State University.

== Career ==
Riddle specializes in pharmacological history particularly of the classical and medieval periods, based on previously under-utilized ancient and medieval sources. His methodology is to draw on the modern understanding of medicine, pharmacy, and chemistry to interpret texts and uncover the rationality of early medicine. He has written extensively about Dioscorides, who published a description of 500 distinct plants around 78 AD that is "still an authority on plants and drugs of ancient times" – it was "the first to study [plants] morphologically thus separating pharmacognosy from medicine." Riddle demonstrated that Dioscorides arranged his presentation of drugs by affinities and based on their physiological action. This allowed a physician who did not have a particular drug to look to the preceding or following entries for potential alternatives.

He has advanced the view that women in classical antiquity, the Middle Ages, and the Early Modern period deliberately used herbal abortifacients as a means of fertility regulation. Historian Etienne van de Walle has quoted Riddle as stating that "most women" in the Middle Ages knew that certain herbs and herbal products could be taken to induce an abortion in the early stages of pregnancy and that this knowledge was primarily shared amongst women, thus affording them "more control over their lives than we thought possible".

Riddle was the president of the Society for Ancient Medicine and the American Institute for the History of Pharmacy. In 1987, Riddle was awarded the International Urdang Medal for Outstanding Writing in the History of Medicine and Pharmacy. In 1988, he was made a member of the Institute for Advanced Study in Princeton, New Jersey.

== Response ==
Van de Walle described Riddle as the "strongest advocate" for the position that women in classical antiquity, the Middle Ages, and the Early Modern period deliberately used herbal abortifacients, and has criticized his suggestion that "these drugs were perfected over centuries in a female culture of which males—who were doing the writing—had only a partial and imperfect understanding."

Historian Gary B. Ferngren has also taken issue with these hypotheses, particularly because of what he called the circumstantial nature of Riddle's evidence, writing that the ideas remained "unproved and unlikely".

Other critics include demographer Gigi Santow, who wrote that Riddle overemphasizes the role of herbs and seeks "not so much to persuade as to convert," and medical historian Helen King, who has written that Riddle makes claims about modern pharmacology that are not supported by his source materials.

== Published works ==
- Marbode of Rennes' De Lapidibus: Considered as a Medical Treatise with Text, Commentary, and C.W. King's Translation, Together with Text and Translation of Marbode's Minor Works on Stones (Steiner, Sudhoffs Archiv, 1977)
- Dioscorides on Pharmacy and Medicine (University of Texas press, 1986)
- Contraception and Abortion from the Ancient World to the Renaissance (Cambridge, MA: Harvard University Press, 1992)
- Quid pro quo: Studies in the History of Drugs (Aldershot: Variorum, 1992)
- Eve's Herbs: A History of Contraception and Abortion in the West (Cambridge, MA: Harvard University Press, 1997)
- A History of the Middle Ages, 300-1500 (Lanham: Rowman and Littlefield, 2008; 2nd ed. revised 2016).
- Goddesses, Elixirs, and Witches: Plants and Sexuality Throughout Human History (Palgrave Macmillan, 2010)
