= Cristóbal de Villalón =

Cristóbal de Villalón (c. 1500 – c. 1558) was a Spanish professor and humanist. He was probably a native of Villalón de Campos. He obtained a bachelor of arts degree from the University of Alcalá in 1525 and a licentiate in logic from the University of Salamanca in 1529 or 1530. From 1530 to 1545, he was a professor of logic at the University of Valladolid. In 1532–1534, he was a private tutor in Latin and rhetoric to the family of the Counts of Lemos. He won a lawsuit against the countess for back wages. In 1545, he obtained a degree in theology from Valladolid. He may have become a priest around this time. He retired to Santa Eulalia de Tábara, where he died.

== Works ==
- Tragedia de Mirra, written while a student and published at Medina del Campo in 1536
- Ingeniosa comparación entre lo antiguo y lo presente, written while a student and published at Valladolid in 1539
- El Scholástico, written while a student at Salamanca, known from a manuscript of 1542–1544. This was his most ambitious work. Influenced by the ideas of Desiderius Erasmus and imitating Baldassare Castiglione's Book of the Courtier, it describes the ideal scholar and university. It met with the disapproval of ecclesiastical officials, including Juan Ginés de Sepúlveda.
- Tratado de cambios y contrataciones y reprobación de usura, published at Valladolid in 1541 with further editions in 1542 and 1546. His most popular work, it condemned the innovations of merchants in response to Spanish inflation as usurious.
- Exhortación a la confesión, published as an appendix to the Tratado at Valladolid in 1546
- Gramática castellana, written at Santa Eulalia and printed at Antwerp in 1558

In addition, two anonymous satiric works in manuscript from the period 1552–1556 are usually attributed to him:

- Diálogo de las transformaciones de Pitágoras, probably written at Santa Eulalia
- El Crótalon, probably written at Santa Eulalia
