= Physician Preparing an Elixir =

Illustration in the De materia medica

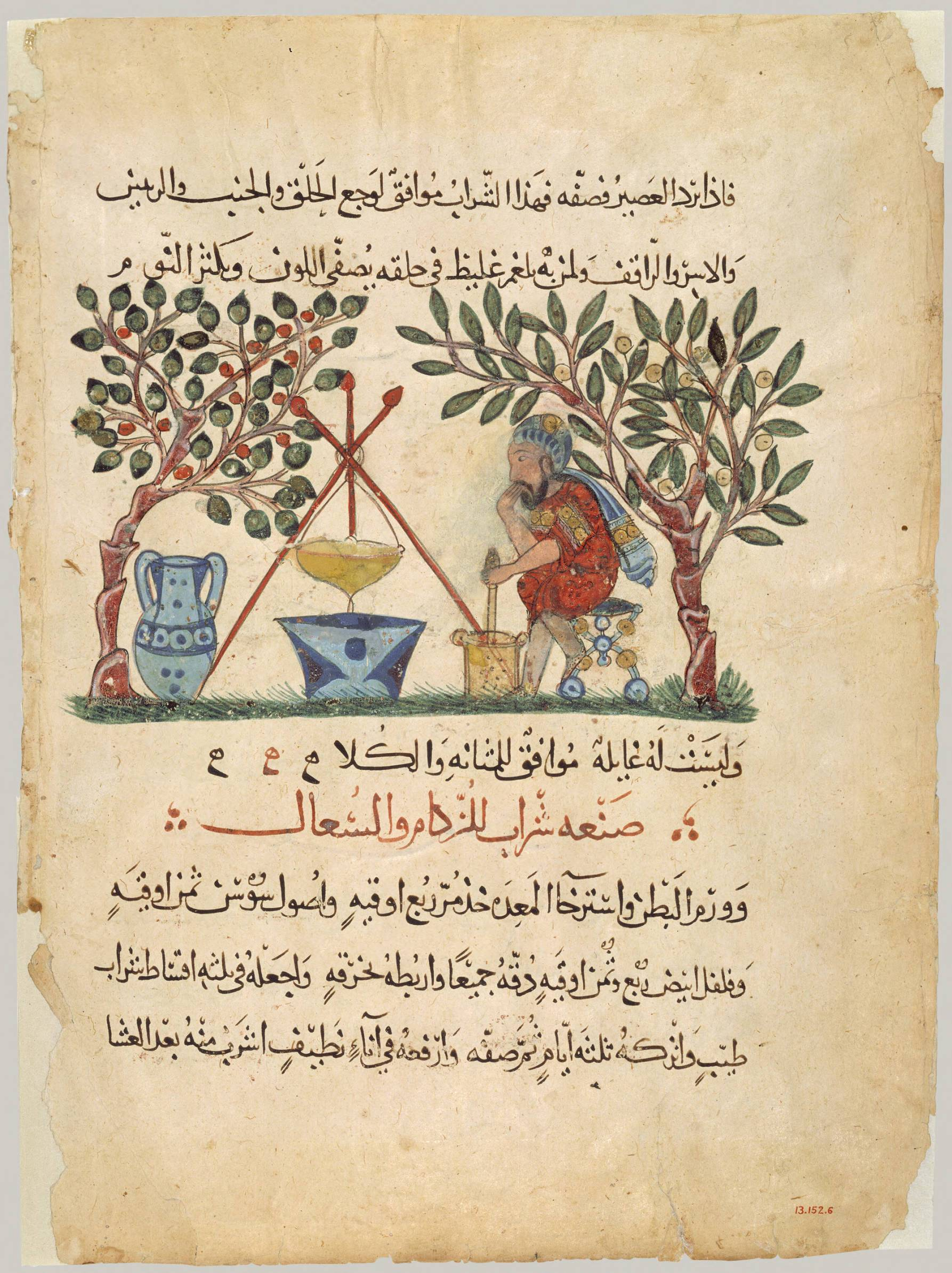
Physician Preparing an Elixir

The Physician Preparing an Elixir is a miniature on a folio from an illustrated manuscript copy, now in the Metropolitan Museum of Art in New York of De Materia Medica, a large herbal or work on the (mostly) medical uses of plants originally written by the ancient Greco-Roman physician, Pedanius Dioscorides, in the first century AD. This page of the manuscript, dated 1224 AD, is made from paper, sized 24.8 cm wide and 33.2 cm long, and is decorated by opaque watercolor, ink, and gold detailing. It is visually split into three horizontal portions from the top of the page to the bottom; the top of the page is dominated by two lines of Arabic script, followed by the image and then five more lines of text in Arabic. The writing below the image is predominantly black with the exception of one line, which is written in red ink and is therefore highlighted to the viewer. The page is usually not on display.

Experts believe that the image was made in Iraq, Northern Jazira or Baghdad. Its Middle Eastern origin is corroborated with the physician's appearance. In the image, he is wearing a headscarf, his clothing is quite colorful and it is detailed with gold decorations. Additionally, the Arabic text is a further indication that this specific page was formed in a Middle Eastern context. In this digital representation, the page looks to be in great condition and has minimal wear and tear.

== Brief History of the Materia Medica ==
The term Materia Medica refers to both a specific text and a genre of texts, a complication illustrated by the diverse history of the original book. Pedanius Dioscorides was a Greek physician, the word here used in the medieval sense, born in 40 A.D. who spent multiple years traveling with the Roman Emperor Nero's army. During these travels, Dioscorides gathered herbal samples and collected knowledge on the practical health uses of plants, amassing notes on over one thousand medicinal substances. In 70 A.D., Dioscorides published De Materia Medica or “On Medicinal Substances” in his native language, Greek. The Materia Medica detailed “plant names, synonyms and illustrations; plant habitat and botanical descriptions; properties, actions and uses of the drug; negative side effects, if any; administration and dosage recommendations; directions on harvesting, preparation and storage of herbs or drugs; possible adulterations and how they're detected; and the veterinary uses of the drug or herb, if any.” The text was published in five volumes and was eventually translated into multiple languages, including Latin and Arabic. This text went on to serve as a central source for knowledge on herbs and similar medical substances. As it traveled to new areas and was handed down through different leaders and dynasties, it was modified, rearranged and added to with the knowledge of those places. Therefore, this page in this Materia Medica is not identical to the original by Dioscoride or other surviving copies.

== History of the specific object ==
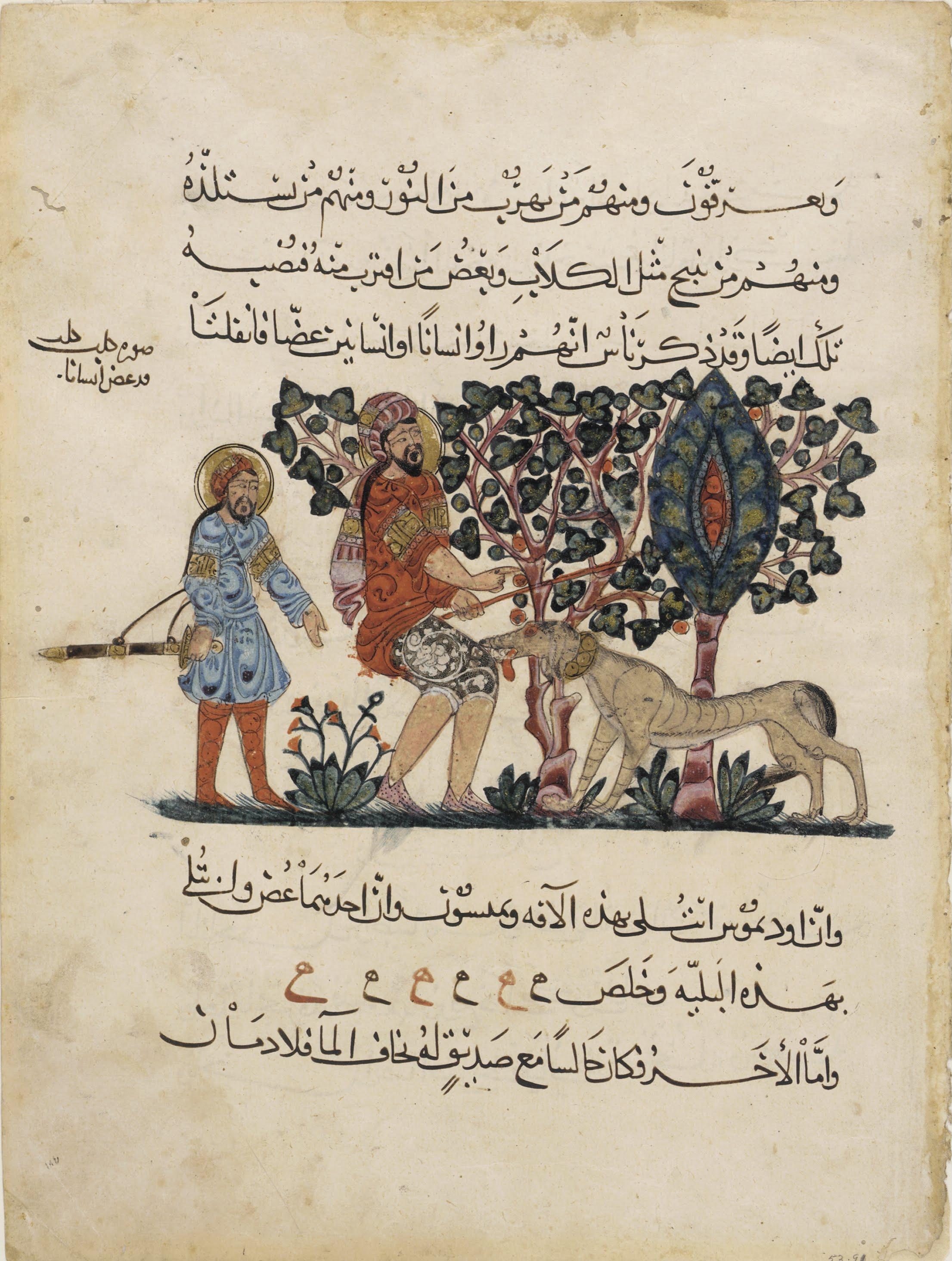
A man bitten by a rabid dog, another page from the same manuscript

In 1913, the Metropolitan Museum of Art in New York, New York received the folio after a history of European ownership. As far as the records show, this page of the manuscript was first collected by F. R. Martin of Stockholm in 1910. F.R. Martin also originally possessed additional folios that came from other copies of Dioscorides’ Materia Medica such as the image titled “Men Stepping on Grapes” which is now also at the MMA. The central folio page, “Physician Preparing an Elixir,” was then moved to the care of Georges. J. Demotte in Paris until 1913 when it was officially acquired by the museum. Demotte was a Belgian-born Parisian art dealer of the late 19th to early 20th century who also gave many different art and archaeological finds to the Metropolitan Museum. Demotte has become known for his acquisition of the Islamic “Book of Kings” or the Shahnameh, which he sold page by page to different interested parties.

The fact that this page is from a highly translated text, De Materia Medica, may distort some of our analysis due to the great changes a literary work undergoes during translation. As the Materia Medica became widely spread and translated into multiple languages, this page and others may have traveled with physicians or along trade routes to reach new destinations and communities. Therefore, this text, as illustrated by its aesthetic and geographical origins in the Middle East, could display a very different side of the Materia Medica genre. It is possible that this page was an addition, performed by Middle Eastern physicians, in the 13th century and did not exist as a part of the early Materia Medica's during the time of Dioscoride. Additionally, though the original five-volume text was an assemblage of information, perhaps for the aim of practical instruction, this page seems to diverge from that initial focus. It is esthetically pleasing, apparently quite valuable as shown by the gold detailing, and overall, seems to have been a precious object as shown by the minimal wear and tear depicted on its page on the MMA website. Therefore, one can assume that at least this page was not a highly circulated text within the Middle Eastern community. Perhaps this text was kept among scholars and through this seclusion in academic society, remained in good condition.

== Context ==
The physician is surrounded by multiple different tools, perhaps signifying the importance of such inventions during the time this manuscript page was created. The physician is sitting on a stool and is making an elixir in a medium-sized pot using a mixing tool. He is seated in front of a medieval contraption that could have been used for filtering or other processes. To the far left of the image, on the other side of the potential filtering tool, there is a large blue jug. The prominence of these tools, perhaps important to the physician's preparation of the elixir, are highlighted by their placement and coloring on the page.

Additionally, the depiction of the physician in this text could illustrate the place of physicians in society in the Middle East during this time period. As previously explained, this text could have been an object of Middle Eastern academic society. Physicians in the 13th century were highly respected members of society as they were viewed as learned men. They were taught in the intricacies of humoral theory and were charged with the health of many communities. The physician in this image, demonstrated by the elaborate coloring of his shirt and its implications for his high social class, could be the depiction of an ideal. This man could be a representation of the “ideal Middle Eastern 13th century physician,” a man of ingenuity with his tools, knowledge of plants and herbs, and high social status. Yet, internal to this interpretation is a contradiction as the high society physician would also not be found working in such an outdoor environment. This physician would instead be found in a more scholarly/academic environment for this time period as the physicians of the 13th century were more invested in humoral theory than in herbs and plants. Therefore, the "physician" in this text could represent the work of an herbalist of this time period as opposed to a physician. In this way, the page “Physician Preparing an Elixir” may display not only the great herbal and medical knowledge dating back to Dioscoride's trips with Nero, but also the changing depiction of medical and societal ideals, all found within the same, diverse manuscript.
