= Matthaeus Silvaticus =

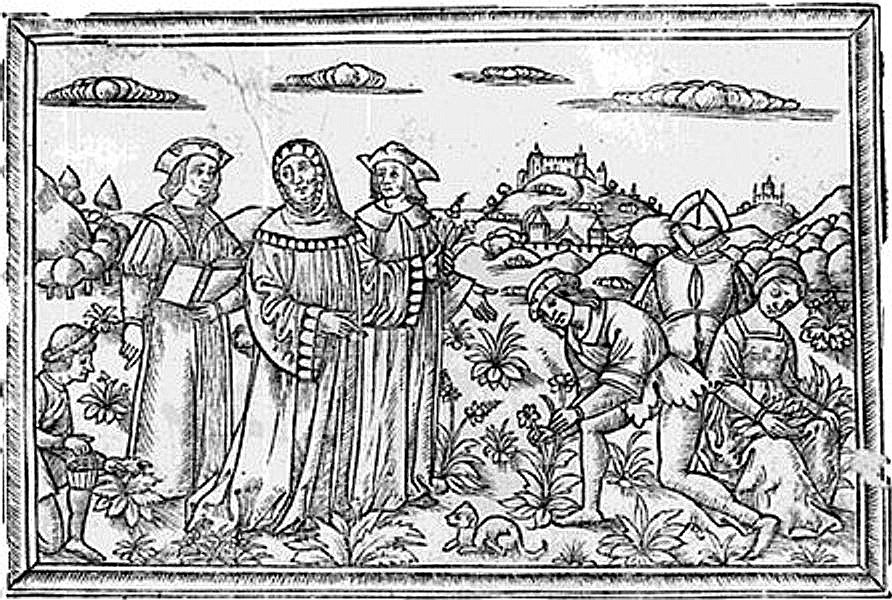
Matthaeus Silvaticus teaching his students about medicinal plants in his physic garden in Salerno, from the frontispiece to a 1526 edition of Opus Pandectarum Medicinae

Matthaeus Silvaticus or Mattheus Sylvaticus (c. 1280 – c. 1342) was an Italian medieval medical writer and botanist.

== His Life and Encyclopedia ==
Matthaeus Silvaticus was born in northern Italy, probably Mantua. He was a student and teacher in botany and medicine at the School of Salerno in southern Italy.

His only notability is for writing a 650-page encyclopedia about medicating agents (a pharmacopoeia) which he completed about the year 1317 under the Latin title Pandectarum Medicinae or Pandectae Medicinae (English: Encyclopedia of Medicines). Most of the medicating agents were botanicals ("herbal medicines"). The presentation is in alphabetical order. The bulk of his encyclopedia is compiled from earlier medicine books, including books by Dioscorides, Avicenna, Serapion the Younger, and Simon of Genoa (Simon Januensis).

As an indication of its popularity in late medieval Europe, the Pandectarum Medicinae was printed in at least eleven editions in various countries between the invention of the printing press and 1500.

== Arabic influence ==
The medical school in Salerno was influenced by Arabic-to-Latin translations of Arabic medical literature. One indication of the Arabic influence is that A reported 233 of the 487 plant names in Matthaeus Silvaticus's Liber pandectarum medicinae were Latinized forms of Arabic names. Many of these Arabic-derived terms were relatively uncommon in earlier Latin medical literature.Native Latin names existed for some of them, and Matthaeus used those names alongside the Arabic-derived names. In some cases, he gives priority to the Arabic name over the classical Latin name. In other cases, he gives priority to the Latin name and merely mentions its Arabic equivalent.

== Sources compiled from ==
The Pandectarum Medicinae is an encyclopedia with almost no original contribution by Matthaeus. It has value to historians as a document reflecting the state of pharmacology and medicine in Europe in the late medieval era. The method of presentation in Pandectarum Medicinae is that a medicinal substance is named with brief identifying information and then follows several lengthier summaries or quotations from well-known medical authorities about the substance's properties and uses. The medical authorities are either (A) the particular ancient Greek medicines writers that were widely read by the medieval Arabs (especially Dioscorides and Galen) or else (B) the Arabic medicines writers available in Latin translations (especially Serapion the Younger and Avicenna).

== Simon of Genoa ==
Part of Matthaeus's encyclopedia was taken from a shorter work by Simon of Genoa entitled Synonyma Medicinae, which was written a few decades earlier and which is a dictionary of medicines rather than an encyclopedia of medicines.
