= Nicole (name) =

- Pronunciation: /nɪˈkoʊl/ ni-KOHL
- Gender: Female

Origin
- Languages: Greek, French
- Meaning: "victory of the people"

Other names
- Nicknames: Cole, Nicki, Nic, Nikki, Niki, Nik
- Derived: Νικόλαος (Nikolaos), a combination of Greek words "Victory" (nikē) and "People" (laos)
- Related names: Colette

Nicole is a feminine given name and a surname.

The given name Nicole is a French feminine derivative of the masculine given name Nicolas, which is ultimately from the Ancient Greek Νικόλαος (Nikólaos), composed of the elements níkē “victory” and laós “people” (hence it may be interpreted as "victory of the people"). There are many variants. The spelling "Nicole" also saw use as a medieval French man's name, e.g., Nicole Oresme.

== People with the given name or variants ==
=== Music ===
- Nicole (Chilean singer) (born 1977), pop and rock singer
- Nicole Appleton (born 1974), Canadian–born English singer and television presenter
- Nicole Atkins (born 1978), American singer and songwriter
- Nicole Bus, Dutch singer
- Nicole Cabell (born 1977), American classical and opera singer
- Nicole Cook (born 1984), Canadian murderer
- Nicole Dollanganger (born 1991), Canadian singer and songwriter
- Nicole Fiorentino (born 1979), American bass guitarist
- Nicole Jung (born 1991), Korean–American singer
- Nicole Mitchell (born 1967), American jazz flautist
- Nicole C. Mullen (born 1967), American actress, choreographer, singer, and songwriter
- Nicole Renée, American singer-songwriter
- Nicole Row (born 1991), American bass player and singer
- Nicole Scherzinger (born 1978), American dancer, singer, songwriter, and lead singer of The Pussycat Dolls
- Nicole Seibert (born 1964), known for "Ein bißchen Frieden"
- Nicole Theriault (born 1972), Thai singer
- Nicole Wray (born 1979), American singer
- Nicole Zefanya (born 1999), Indonesian singer, and songwriter
- Nicole Zuraitis, American jazz vocalist, pianist, composer and arranger

=== Literature ===
- Nicole Brossard (born 1943), French–Canadian formalist poet and novelist
- Nicole Burdette (born 1963), American playwright and actress
- Nicole Chung (born 1981), American writer
- Nicole Galland, American novelist
- Nicole Krauss (born 1974), American writer
- Nicole Lundrigan, Canadian writer
- Nicole Markotic (born 1962), Canadian poet and novelist
- Nicole Mones (born 1952), American novelist and food writer

=== Film ===
- Nicole Gale Anderson (born 1990), American actress
- Nicole Berger (1934–1967), French actress
- Nicole Beharie (born 1985), American actress and singer
- Nicole Bilderback, American actress
- Nicole Brydon Bloom (born 1994), American actress
- Nicole Byer (born 1986), American comedian and actress
- Nicole Calfan (born 1947), French actress and author
- Nicole Chávez (born 1998), Mexican television actress, model and reality television star
- Nicole Chamoun (born 1984), Australian actress
- Nicole Courcel (1931–2016), French actress
- Nicole da Silva (born 1981), Australian actress
- Nicole de Boer (born 1970), Canadian actress
- Nicole DeHuff (1975–2005), American actress
- Nicole Dorsey, Canadian filmmaker
- Nicole Dubuc, American actress and writer
- Nicole Eggert (born 1972), American actress
- Nicole Forester (born 1972), American actress
- Nicole Fosse, American actress and dancer
- Nicole Grimaudo (born 1980), Italian actress
- Nicole Holofcener (born 1960), American filmmaker
- Nicole Hoey, New Zealand television producer
- Nicole Kassell (born 1972), American filmmaker
- Nicole Kidman (born 1967), Australian–American actress, singer, and film producer
- Nicole Lyn (born 1978), Canadian actress
- Nicole Maines (born 1997), American actress and transgender rights activist
- Nicole Maurey (1925–2016), French actress
- Nicole Muñoz (born 1994), Canadian film and television actress
- Nicole Oliver (born 1970), Canadian actress
- Nicole Paggi (born 1977), American actress
- Nicole Parker (born 1978), American actress, comedian, and singer
- Nicole Ari Parker (born 1970), American actress and model
- Nicole "Snooki" Polizzi (born 1987), American reality television personality
- Nicole Power (born 1989), Canadian actress
- Nicole Riegel, American filmmaker
- Nicole Robert, Canadian film producer
- Nicole Saba (born 1974), Lebanese singer and actress
- Nicole Steinwedell (born 1981), American actress
- Nicole Stéphane (1923–2007), French film director
- Nicole Sullivan (born 1970), American actress, comedian, and voice artist
- Nicole Tubiola (born 1979), American actress
- Nicole Wallace (born 2002), Spanish actress

=== Modelling ===
- Nicole Abe (born 1993), Japanese–Filipina model
- Nicole Borromeo (born 2000), Filipina model and beauty queen
- Nicole Cordoves (born 1992), Filipino model and beauty queen
- Nicole Dunsdon (born 1970), the last person to win the Miss Canada competition
- Nicole Williams English (born 1983), Canadian model and fashion designer
- Nicole Faria (born 1990), Indian model
- Nicole Fox (born 1991), American model, winner of America's Next Top Model, Cycle 13
- Nicole Fujita (born 1998), Japanese model
- Nicole Linkletter (born 1986), American model, winner of America's Next Top Model, Cycle 5
- Nicole Muirbrook (born 1983), American model and actress
- Nicole Narain (born 1974), American model
- Nicole Trunfio (born 1986), Australian model
- Nicole Whitehead (born 1980), American model
- Nicole Williams English (born 1983), Canadian model and fashion designer, 2026 Sports Illustrated Swimsuit cover model

=== Politics ===
- Nicole Ameline (born 1952), French politician
- Nicole Avant (born 1968), American music industry executive and United States ambassador
- Nicole Bäumler (born 1986), German politician
- Nicole Belloubet (born 1955), French politician
- Nicole Bollman, South African politician
- Nicole Chouraqui (1938–1987), French economist and politician
- Nicole Cole, American politician
- Nicole Demers (1950–2023), Canadian politician
- Nicole Dubré-Chirat (born 1951), French politician
- Nicole Eaton (born 1945), Canadian politician
- Nicole Fontaine (1942–2018), French politician
- Nicole Gohlke (born 1975), German politician
- Nicole Greer, American politician
- Nicole Gries-Trisse (born 1963), French politician
- Nicole Le Peih (born 1959), French politician
- Nicole Maes (born 1974), Dutch politician
- Nicole Malliotakis (born 1980), American politician
- Nicole McKee (born 1971 or 1972), New Zealand politician
- Nicole Mitchell (born 1974), American former politician, military officer, and meteorologist
- Nicole Moinat, Dutch politician
- Nicole Nketo Bomele (born 1967), Belgian politician
- Nicole Péry (born 1943), French politician
- Nicole Questiaux (born 1930), French politician
- Nicole Roy-Arcelin (born 1941), Canadian politician
- Nicole Sanquer (born 1972), French Polynesian politician
- Nicole Seah (born 1986), Singaporean politician
- Nicole Sigurdson, American politician
- Nicole Sinclaire (born 1968), British former politician
- Nicole Uhre-Balk, American educator and politician
- Nicole Werner (born 1991), Australian politician
- Nicole Westig (born 1967), German politician
- Nicole A. Williams (born 1977), American politician
- Nicole Wong Siaw Ting (born 1980), Malaysian politician

=== Sport ===
- Nicole Angat (born 1982), Papua New Guinean tennis player
- Nicole Arendt (born 1969), American tennis player
- Nicole Bass (1964–2017), American bodybuilder, actress, and professional wrestler
- Nicole Bates (born 1998), American softball player
- Nicole Bradtke (born 1969), Australian tennis player
- Nicole Cooke (born 1983), Welsh cyclist
- Nicole Davis (born 1982), American volleyball player
- Nicole den Dulk (born 1980), Dutch Paralympic equestrian
- Nicole Enabosi (born 1997), Nigerian basketball player
- Nicole Freedman (born 1972), American cyclist
- Nicole Gibbs (born 1993), American tennis player
- Nicole Gosling (born 2002), Canadian ice hockey player
- Nicole Hall (born 2004), Swedish ice hockey player
- Nicole Haynes (born 1974), Canadian–American athlete
- Nicole Hensley (born 1994), American ice hockey goaltender
- Nicole Hetzer (born 1979), German swimmer
- Nicole Kosta (born 1993), Canadian ice hockey player
- Nicole Livingstone (born 1971), Australian swimmer
- Nicole Mendes (born 1997), American softball player
- Nicole Mitchell (born 1983), Bermudian road cyclist
- Nicole Monsorno (born 2000), Italian cross-country skier
- Nicole Muns-Jagerman (born 1967), Dutch tennis player
- Nicole Nadel (born 2000), Israeli tennis player
- Nicole Pircio (born 2002), Brazilian rhythmic gymnast
- Nicole Powell (born 1982), American basketball player
- Nicole Pratt (born 1973), Australian tennis player
- Nicole Raczynski (born 1979), American professional wrestler
- Nicole Robert (born 1954), Canadian handball player
- Nicole Ross (born 1989), American Olympic foil fencer
- Nicole Schnyder-Benoit (born 1973), Swiss beach volleyball player
- Nicole Toomey (born 2002), New Zealand international lawn bowler
- Nicole Tully (born 1986), American distance runner
- Nicole Uphoff (born 1967), German equestrian
- Nicole Vaidišová (born 1989), Czech tennis player
- Nicole Vallario (born 2001), Swiss ice hockey player
- Nicole Williams (born 1983), American champion skater

=== Other ===
- Pol Pelletier (born 1947), Canadian actor, director, and playwright born Nicole Pelletier
- Nicole, Countess of Penthièvre (c. 1424–1480)
- Nicole, Duchess of Lorraine (1608–1657)
- Nicole Abusharif (born 1980), American murderer convicted for killing her partner, Rebecca Klein
- Nicole Alexandropoulou, Greek-Italian director, producer, screenplay writer and photographer
- Nicole Arbour (born 1982/1983), Canadian actress and YouTuber
- Nicole Aubrey (circa 1550 – fl. 1565), French exorcism subject
- Nicole Blank Becker, Michigan-based lawyer
- Nicole Briscoe (born 1980), American sportscaster
- Nicole Brown Simpson (1959–1994), murdered ex-wife of O. J. Simpson
- Nicole Camphaug, Canadian Inuk fashion designer
- Nicole Cook (born 1984), Canadian murderer
- Nicole d'Oliva (1761–1789), French prostitute and memoirist
- Nicole Diar (born 1975), American murderer
- Nicole Ehrlich, American producer, director, and women's rights activist
- Nicole Eisenman (born 1965), American artist
- Nicole Farhi (born 1946), French sculptor
- Nicole R. Fleetwood, American academic, author, curator, and professor
- Nicole Franzel (born 1992), American television personality
- Nicole Gee (1998–2021), United States Marine Corps Sergeant
- Nicole Gelinas (fl. 2000s–2020s), American conservative journalist
- Nicole Girard-Mangin (1878–1919), in World War I became first woman medical doctor to serve in the French Army
- Nicole de Hauteclocque (1913–1993), French resistance fighter and politician
- Nicole Hernandez Hammer (born c. 1975), American sea-level researcher, climate scientist, and environmental-justice advocate
- Nicole Horseherder, Native American environmental activist
- Nicole van den Hurk (1980–1995), Dutch homicide victim
- Nicole Jaffe (born 1941), Canadian talent agent and actress
- Nicole Junkermann (born 1975), German businesswoman
- Nicole Juteau (born 1954), Canadian police officer
- Nicole Lamb-Hale, American lawyer
- Nicole Lapin (born 1984), American television news anchor, author and businesswoman
- Nicole Laroche (née Schrottenloher) (1945–2019), French engineer, 1964 became the first female Gadzarts at École nationale supérieure d'arts et métiers.
- Nicole-Reine Lepaute (1723–1788), French astronomer
- Nicole Loraux (1943–2003), French historian
- Nicole Lynn (born 1988), American sports agent
- Nicole Malachowski (born 1974), US Air Force officer
- Nicole Miller (born 1952), American fashion designer
- Nicole Minetti (born 1985), Italian television personality, dental hygienist, and politician
- Nicole Moudaber (born 1977), Lebanese British DJ and record producer
- Nicole Perlman (born 1981), American screenwriter
- Nicole Oresme (1325–1382), French philosopher
- Nicole Pollard, American fashion stylist and entrepreneur
- Nicole Richie (born 1981), American socialite, reality television star, fashion designer, and actress
- Nicole Roy, Canadian professor of human nutrition in New Zealand
- Nicole Saphier (born 1981/1982), American radiologist
- Nicole Sawaya (1952–2018), Lebanese-American radio journalist
- Nicole Shanahan (born 1985), American entrepreneur and attorney
- Nicole Stata, American entrepreneur
- Nicole Stott (born 1962), American astronaut
- Nicole Tung (born 1986), Hong Kong–born photojournalist
- Nicole Viloteau, French snake photographer and explorer
- Nicole Wong, American vice president and deputy general counsel at Google

== Surname ==
- Britt Nicole (born 1984), American singer-songwriter
- Bruno Nicolè (1940–2019), Italian footballer
- Cynthia Nicole (1976–2009), Honduran transgender activist
- Danielle Nicole (born 1983), American musician
- Jasika Nicole, American actress and illustrator
- Jayde Nicole (born 1986), Canadian model
- Megan Nicole (born 1993), American singer-songwriter
- Nadine Nicole (born 1983), American actress
- Nicki Nicole (born 2000), Argentine rapper
- Pierre Nicole (1625–1695), French philosopher

== Fictional characters ==
- Nicole Brennan, a Dead Space character, a medical officer aboard the USG Ishimura and Isaac Clarke girlfriend
- Nico Collard, Broken Sword games
- Nicole (Dead or Alive character)
- Nicole, one of Raina's ex friends in the autobiographical novel Smile
- Nicole Bristow, a character in the Nickelodeon show Zoey 101
- Nicole Carmelson, a character in the film Twitches
- Nicole Gordon, a character in the drama series Pretty Little Liars
- Nicole Herrera, a character in the Paramount series School Spirits
- Nicole Lee, a character from the television sitcom Hangin' with Mr. Cooper, played by Raven-Symoné
- Nicole ''Nikki'' Maxwell, the protagonist of the Dork Diaries book series
- Nicole La Monda, the antagonist of Bratz: Go to Paris
- Nicole Mossbacher, character in season 1 of The White Lotus
- Nicole "Nikki" Parker, a character in the sitcom The Parkers, played by Mo'Nique
- Nicole Patterson, antagonist in the Disney Channel film Geek Charming
- Nicole Richardson, from The Summer I Turned Pretty
- Nicole "Niki" Sanders, a character from the TV series Heroes
- Nicole Walker, a character on the American soap opera Days of Our Lives
- Nicole Wallace, a character on Law & Order: Criminal Intent played by actress Olivia d'Abo
- Nicole "Nikki" Watkins, a Mattel doll and character in the Barbie franchise
- Nicole Watterson, a character in the animated series The Amazing World of Gumball and The Wonderfully Weird World of Gumball
- Nicole "Nikki" Newman, a character on the America soap opera The Young and the Restless
- Nicole Williams, a fictional character in the animated TV series Craig of the Creek
- Nicole ''Nikki'' Wong, a character in the animated sitcom 6teen
- Nicole reeyn, a character from the game Genshin Impact

== See also ==
- Nicolle
- Miklós
- Mikołaj
- Mikuláš (disambiguation)
- Nic
- Niccolò
- Nicholas
- Nichole
- Nicholle
- Nick (disambiguation)
- Nicki
- Nickie (disambiguation)
- Nicky
- Nicola (disambiguation)
- Nicolae (disambiguation)
- Nicolai (disambiguation)
- Nicolas (disambiguation)
- Nicolau
- Nicolaus
- Nicoletta
- Nicolette (disambiguation)
- Niels
- Nike (mythology)
- Niki (disambiguation)
- Nikki (disambiguation)
- Niklaus (disambiguation)
- Nikola
- Nikolais
- Nikolaj
- Nikolaos
- Nikolay (disambiguation)
