= Nicola (name) =

- Gender: Unisex

Origin
- Language: Greek
- Meaning: Victory
- Region of origin: Greece; Italy

Other names
- Related names: Nicholas; Nickola; Nicole; Nicolette

Nicola or Nichola is a Latinised version of the Greek personal name Nikolaos (Νικόλαος), derived from the nikē meaning "victory", and laos meaning "people", therefore implying the meaning "victory of the people". Nicola is both a male and female name, depending on cultural norms.

Nicola was a frequently given male personal name among the traditional Italian nobility, and was used often in the Middle Ages. The spelling Nikola is widely used in Slavic language speaking areas. The English form of the same name is Nicholas, with Nicolas common in French and Spanish-speaking countries, and Nicolau in Portuguese-speaking countries.

Nicola has been used as a female name since at least 1150 (the birth date of Lady Nicola de la Haie) and continues as a contemporary female name in Germany, the British Isles and Scandinavia. Less commonly, the name is spelled "Nichola" or "Nickola". The female form of Nicola in Italian is Nicoletta. Other forms of the female name in other languages include Nicole and Nicolette in French, Nikolett or Nikoletta in Hungarian, Νικολέττα or Νίκη in Greek.

== Name days ==
- 21 March and 10 September (Hungary)
- 29 August (Slovakia)
- 3 September (United Kingdom)
- 20 November (Czech Republic)
- 6 December, in line with Saint Nicholas (Bulgaria, Croatia, Germany, Greece, Italy, Latvia, Netherlands, Poland, Slovenia)
- 19 December, Saint Nikola (North Macedonia, Serbia)

== Given name: Nicola ==
=== A–L ===
- Nicola Abbagnano (1901–1990), Italian existential philosopher
- Nicola Adams (born 1982), English boxer
- Nicola Amoruso (born 1974), Italian football player
- Nicola Asuni (born 1973), Italian sprinter
- Nicola Baldan (born 1982), Italian racing driver
- Nicola Barr (born 1996), Australian rules footballer
- Nicola Benedetti (born 1987), Scottish classic violinist
- Nicola Berti (born 1967), Italian football player
- Nicola Best, British statistician
- Nicola Blackwood-Bate (born 1979), British politician
- Nicola Böcker-Giannini (born 1975), German politician
- Nicola Boem (born 1989), Italian road cyclist
- Nicola Bolger (born 1993), Australian football player
- Nicola Bombacci (1879–1945), Italian Marxist revolutionary
- Nicola Brasch, New Zealand chemistry academic
- Nicola Brogan, Northern Irish politician
- Nicola Brown (disambiguation), several people
- Nicola Bryant (born 1960), British actress
- Nicola Calipari (1953–2005), Italian military intelligence officer with the rank of major general
- Nicola I. Campbell, Indigenous Canadian author, poet, and educator
- Nicola Caputo (born 1966), Italian politician
- Nicola Conte, Italian DJ and producer
- Nicola Coughlan (born 1987), Irish actress
- Nicola Covelli (1790–1829), Italian chemist and naturalist
- Nicola Davison, Canadian writer
- Nicola Di Bari (born 1940), Italian singer-songwriter
- Nicola Dinan (born 1994), British-Malaysian writer
- Nicola Docherty (born 1992), Scottish footballer
- Nicola Drocco (born 1979), Italian skeleton racer
- Nicola Edgington (born 1980), British murderer
- Nicola Fairbrother (born 1970), British judoka
- Nicola Filippo (born 1957), American artist
- Nicola Glencross (born 1989), Scottish wrestler
- Nicola Gobbo, Australian lawyer
- Nicola Grauso (1949−2025), Italian businessman, publisher and politician.
- Nicola Griffith (born 1960), British author
- Nicola de la Haie (died 1230), English landowner and military administrator
- Nicola Harness (born 1987), English actress
- Nicola Heywood-Thomas (1955–2023), Welsh broadcaster and journalist
- Nicola Hopewell (born 1991), English boxer
- Nicola Jackson (born 1984), British swimmer
- Nicola Jackson (artist) (born 1960), New Zealand artist
- Nicola Jennings, British cartoonist
- Nicola King, fictional character on the ITV soap opera Emmerdale
- Nicola L (1932–2018), Moroccan-born French visual artist
- Nicola Lacorte (born 2007), racing driver
- Nicola Lagatao (born 1991), Guamanian weightlifter
- Nicola Lamb, British chef and author
- Nicola Lamon (born 1979), Italian harpsichordist and organist
- Nicola Larini (born 1964), racing driver
- Nicola Legrottaglie (born 1976), Italian football player
- Nicola Luisotti (born 1961), Italian musician

=== M–Z ===
- Nicola Maldacea (1870–1945), Italian actor
- Nicola Marinangeli (born 2003), Italian racing driver
- Nicola Marzari, computational materials scientist and condensed-matter physicist
- Nicola Mendelsohn (born 1971), British advertising executive
- Nicola McEwen, Scottish professor of territorial politics
- Nicola Pagett (1945–2021), English actress
- Nicola Peltz (born 1995), American actress
- Nicola Philippaerts (born 1993), Belgian show jumping rider
- Nicola Phillips, academic, vice-chancellor of Adelaide University from 2026
- Nicola Pierce (born 1969), Irish writer and ghost writer
- Nicola Pietrangeli (1933–2025), Italian tennis player
- Nicola Pintus (born 2005), Italian footballer
- Nicola Piovani (born 1946), classical musician
- Nicola Pisano (1220s–1284), Italian sculptor
- Nicola Pozzi (born 1986), Italian football player
- Nicola Ann Raphael (1985–2001), Scottish schoolgirl who committed suicide
- Nicola Rauti (born 2000), Italian football player
- Nicola Rescigno (1916–2008), Italian-American opera conductor
- Nicola Richards (born 1994), British politician
- Nicola Rizzoli (born 1971), Italian football referee
- Nicola Roberts (born 1985), British popstar, member of Girls Aloud
- Nicola Romanin (born 1994), Italian biathlete
- Nicola Rossi-Lemeni (1920–1991), Russian-Italian operatic bass
- Nicola Rubinstein, fictional character on the ITV soap opera Coronation Street
- Nicola Sacco (1891–1927), Italian-American anarchist ("Sacco and Vanzetti")
- Nicola Shulman (born 1960), British biographer
- Nicola Smith (born 1949), English bridge player
- Nicola Smith (footballer) (born 1980), New Zealand football player
- Nicola Spurrier, Australian paediatrician and public health physician, Chief Public Health Officer of South Australia
- Nicola Sturgeon (born 1970), Former Leader of the SNP and the former First Minister of Scotland between 2014 and 2023
- Nicola Tallis (born 1985), British historian and author
- Nicola Tappenden (born 1982), British glamour model
- Nicola Walker (born 1970), British actress
- Nicola Young (born 1954 or 1955), New Zealand politician
- Nicola Zalewski (born 2002), Polish football player
- Nicola (Okanagan leader) (1780/85 – c.1865), First Nations political figure in the fur trade era of British Columbia, Canada

== Given name: Nichola ==
- Nichola (fool) (fl. 1560–1570), fool or jester to Mary, Queen of Scots
- Nichola Beck, English badminton player
- Nichola Bruce (born 1953), British film director, cinematographer, screenwriter, and artist
- Nichola Burley (born 1986), British actress
- Nichola Fryday (born 1995), Irish rugby player
- Nichola Goddard (1980–2006), Canadian soldier
- Nichola Gutgold (born 1964), American scholar and academic
- Nichola Holt, contestant on Series 1 of the British TV show Big Brother
- Nichola Hope (born 1975), Welsh artist
- Nichola Kane, broadcast journalist and producer working in Scotland
- Nichola Mallon (born 1979), Northern Irish politician
- Nichola McAuliffe (born 1955), British television and stage actress and writer
- Nichola Pease (born 1961), British fund manager
- Nichola Raihani, British psychologist
- Nichola Simpson (born 1956), British archer
- Nichola Theobald, British film, television and voice-over actress, television presenter and fashion model

== Surname ==
- Carlos Nicola (born 1973), Uruguayan footballer
- Davide Nicola (born 1973), Italian football player and manager
- Enrico De Nicola (1877–1959), Italian jurist, journalist, politician and provisional Head of State of republican Italy from 1946 to 1948
- Isaac Nicola (1916–1997), Cuban guitarist
- James C. Nicola, American theatre director
- Lewis Nicola (1717–1807), Irish-American military officer during the American Revolutionary War, author of the Newburgh letter
- Marcelo Nicola (born 1971), Argentine-Italian basketball player and coach

== See also ==
- Nikola, given name
- Nicolae (name)
- Nicolai (given name)
- Nicolaj
- Nicolao
- Nicolas (given name)
- Nicolau
- Nicolau (surname)
- Nicolay (disambiguation)
- Nicole (disambiguation)
