= Nicolai (given name) =

Nicolai is a given name. Notable persons with that name include:

- Nicolai Belokosov (born 1975), Moldovan judoka
- Nicolai Borger (born 1974), German writer, actor and director
- Nicolai Gedda (1925–2017), Swedish operatic tenor
- Nicolai Jørgensen (born 1991), Danish footballer
- Nicolai Kielstrup (born 1991), Danish singer
- Nicolai Lomov (1946–2020), Russian classical pianist
- Nicolai Petkov, Dutch computer scientist
- Nicolai Tangen (born 1966), Norwegian hedge fund manager

== See also ==
- Nicolai (disambiguation)
- Nicolai (surname)
- Niccolai
- Nicola (name)
- Nicolae (name)
- Nicolaj
- Nicolao
- Nicolas (given name)
- Nicolau
- Nicolau (surname)
- Nicolay (disambiguation)
- Nicolay (disambiguation)
- Nikolai (disambiguation)
- Nikolaj
- Nikolay (disambiguation)
