= Nikoletta =

Nikoletta is a Danish, Finnish, German, Hungarian, Icelandic, Norwegian and Swedish feminine given name derived from the Greek Nikolaos. Notable people with this name include the following:

- Nikoletta Kiss (born 1997), Hungarian swimmer
- Nikoletta Lakos (born 1978), Hungarian chess grandmaster
- Nikoletta Nagy (born 1994), Hungarian model
- Nikoletta Samonas (born 1985), Ghanaian actress known as Nikki Samonas
- Nikoletta Szőke (born 1978), Hungarian jazz vocalist
- Nikoletta Tsagari (born 1990), Greek rhythmic gymnast

== See also ==
- Nicolette (disambiguation)
- Nicoletta (disambiguation)
- Nikoleta (disambiguation)
- Nicoleta
