= Nicolai =

Nicolai may refer to:

- Nicolai (given name) people with the forename Nicolai
- Nicolai (surname) people with the surname Nicolai
- Nicolai (crater), a crater on the Moon

== See also ==
- Niccolai, a surname
- Nicholai
- Nicolae (disambiguation)
- Nicolao
- Nicolay (disambiguation)
- Nikolai (disambiguation)
- Nikolay (disambiguation)
