= Alexandropoulos =

Alexandropoulos (Greek: Αλεξανδρόπουλος) is a surname. Notable people with the surname include:

- Konstantinos Alexandropoulos (born 1957), Greek sailor
- Michalis Alexandropoulos (born 1972), Greek volleyball player
- Nicole Alexandropoulou, Greek-Italian director and producer
- Sotiris Alexandropoulos (born 2001), Greek footballer
