= Nikolaos =

- Pronunciation: Greek: [niˈkolaos]
- Gender: Male
- Language: Greek

Origin
- Origin: Greek
- Meaning: conquer people
- Region of origin: Greece

Other names
- Derived: νίκη nikē 'victory' and λαός laos 'people'
- Related names: Nicholas, Nicolas, Niccolò, Nikolay/Nikolaj/Nicolay/Nicolae, Niklaus, Nicola/Nikola/Nikolla, Nikollë, Nicole/Nicolle/Nichole, Nico, Niko, Nikos, Nikita, Nicanor

Nikolaos (Greek: Νικόλαος, Nikólaos) is a common Greek given name which means "Victor of People", a compound of níkē (νίκη, "victory") and laós (λαός, "people"). The connotation is "people's champion" or "conqueror of people". The English form of the same name—via French and Latin—is Nicholas. In the Bible, this is the name of a proselyte of Antioch and one of the seven deacons of the church at Jerusalem.

== People with first name Nikolaos ==
In sports:

- Nikolaos Andreadakis, Greek athlete
- Nikolaos Andriakopoulos, Greek gymnast
- Nikolaos Balanos, Greek architect
- Nikolaos Dorakis, Greek shooter
- Nikolaos Georgantas (1880-1958), Greek athlete
- Nikolaos Georgeas, former Greek football player who last played for AEK Athens FC
- Nikolaos Giantsopoulos (born 1994), Canadian soccer player
- Nikolaos Kaklamanakis, Greek gold-medal winner who lit the Olympic torch in the opening ceremony of the 2004 Summer Olympics
- Nikolaos Levidis, Greek shooter
- Nikolaos Lyberopoulos (b. 1975), Greek football player
- Nikolaos Michopoulos, Greek professional football player
- Nikolaos Efthimiou (1990-1993), Greek football athlete for AEK then the Dallas Sidekicks for 1993-1999
- Nikolaos Morakis, Greek shooter
- Nikolaos Siranidis, Greek diver who competed in the synchronised 3-metre springboard competition at the 2004 Summer Olympics
- Nikolaos Stamatonikolos, Greek Long jumper
- Nicolaos Trikupis, Greek Shooter, Politician, and Army General
- Nikolaos Tsiantakis (b. 1963), retired Greek football midfielder

In other fields:

- Saint Nicholas, known to the Greeks as Saint Nikolaos
- Prince Nikolaos of Greece and Denmark (b. 1969)
- Nikolaos Chalikiopoulos Mantzaros (1795-1872), Greek composer
- Nikolaos Damaskenos, Syrian historian and philosopher in the Augustan age of the Roman Empire
- Nikolaos Douvas, (b. 1947), former Chief of Staff of the Hellenic Army
- Nikolaos Kavadias (1910–1975), Greek poet and writer
- Nikolaos Makarezos (1919-2009), Greek army general
- Nikolaos Mantzaros (1795-1872), Greek composer
- Nikolaos Mavrogenis (d. 1790), Phanariote Prince of Wallachia
- Nikolaos Oikonomides (1934-2000), notable Greek Byzantinist
- Nikolaos Plastiras (1883-1953), General of the Greek army
- Nikolaos Sifounakis, (b. 1949), Greek politician
- Nikolaos Skoufas (1779-1818), member of Filiki Eteria
- Nikolaos Trikoupis, Major General with the Greek Army during the Greco-Turkish War of 1919-1922
- Nikolaos Xydias Typaldos (1826-1909), Greek painter
- Nikolaos Zachariadis (1903-1973), General Secretary of the Communist Party of Greece

In fiction:

- Nikolaos is the Master Vampire of the City of St. Louis in Laurell K. Hamilton's novel Guilty Pleasures.

== See also ==
- Nikos, the diminutive form of the name
- Nikol
- Nikolaus (given name)
- Nicholas for use of the name in English
- Agios Nikolaos, various places in Greece and Cyprus
- Niccolò
