= Nicolaj =

Nicolaj is a masculine given name. People with that name include the following:

== Given name ==
- Nicolaj Agger (born 1988), Danish footballer
- Nicolaj Charles Sofus Clausen (1900 – 1989), Danish boxer known as Nick Clausen
- Nicolaj Bo Larsen (born 1971), Danish cyclist
- Nicolaj Hansen (1855 - 1932), Danish composer
- Nicolaj Jensen (born 1995), Danish video game player known by his in-game name, "Jensen" (Jensen (video game player))
- Nicolaj Køhlert (born 1993), Danish footballer
- Nicolaj Kopernikus (born 1967), Danish actor
- Nicolaj Laegsgaard (born 1996), Danish cricketer
- Nicolaj Madsen (born 1988), Danish footballer
- Nicolaj Rasted (born 1985), Danish musician
- Nicolaj Ritter (born 1992), Danish footballer
- Nicolaj Schröder (born 1980), Swedish entertainer known as Nic Schröder
- Nicolaj Siggelkow, American economist
- Nicolaj Thomsen (born 1993), Danish footballer

== Middle name ==
- Carl Christian Nicolaj Balle (1806–1855), Danish composer
- Peter Nicolaj Arbo (1768 – 1827), Norwegian businessman

== See also ==
- Nicola (name)
- Nicolae (name)
- Nicolai (given name)
- Nicolao
- Nicolas (given name)
- Nicolau
- Nicolau (surname)
- Nicolay
- Nikolaj
