= Nicolae (name) =

- Pronunciation: Romanian: [nikoˈla.e] /nɪkoʊleɪ/
- Gender: male

Origin
- Origin: Aromanian, Romanian
- Meaning: "Victory of the People"

Nicolae (or Niculae) is an Aromanian and Romanian masculine given name or surname, the equivalent of the English Nicholas. In Romanian, its feminine form is Nicoleta.

== In politics ==
- Nicolae Alexandru of Wallachia, Prince of Wallachia between 1352 and November 1364
- Nicolae Bălcescu, Romanian Wallachian soldier, historian, journalist, and leader of the 1848 Wallachian Revolution
- Nicolae Ceaușescu, communist leader of the Socialist Republic of Romania from 1965 until his execution in 1989
- Nicolae Cernăuțeanu, Bessarabian politician, member of Sfatul Țării
- Nicolae Ciucă, former Romanian army general, served as Prime Minister of Romania
- Nicolae Kretzulescu, Romanian politician, served as Prime Minister
- Nicolae Cristea (communist)
- Nicolae Cristea (priest)
- Nicolae Enescu, Romanian politician
- Nicolae Golescu, Wallachian Romanian politician, served as Prime Minister
- Nicolae Iorga, historian, university professor, literary critic, memorialist, playwright, poet, and Romanian politician
- Nicolae Osmochescu, Moldovan academic and politician
- Nicolae Păiș, Romanian navy officer, served as Minister of the Air Force and the Navy
- Nicolae Petrescu-Comnen, Romanian diplomat, politician
- Nicolae Rădescu, Romanian army officer, served as Prime Minister
- Nicolae Rosetti-Bălănescu, Romanian politician, served as Minister of Foreign Affairs
- Nicolae Samsonovici, Romanian army officer, served as Defense Minister
- Nicolae Titulescu, Romanian diplomat, government minister, and President of the League of Nations
- Nicolae Văcăroiu, Romanian politician, served as Prime Minister
- Nicolae Țâu, Moldovan politician who was Foreign Minister of Moldova between 1990 and 1993.

== In science ==
- Nicolae Blatt, Romanian ophthalmologist, surgeon, and medical researcher
- Nicolae Donici, Romanian astronomer born in Bessarabia
- Nicolae Hortolomei, Romanian surgeon and academic
- Nicolae Leon, Romanian biologist
- Nicolae Paulescu, Romanian physiologist, professor of medicine and the discoverer of insulin
- Nicolae Popescu, Romanian mathematician
- Nicolae Teclu, Romanian chemist, inventor of the "Teclu burner"
- Nicolae Vasilescu-Karpen, Romanian engineer and physicist, who did pioneering work in the field of telegraphy and telephony

== In other fields ==
- Nicolae Alevra, Romanian general and politician
- Nicolae Butacu, Romanian swimmer
- Nicolae Cambrea, Romanian general
- Nicolae Carandino, Romanian author, pamphleteer, translator, and writer
- Nicolae Ciupercă, Romanian general
- Nicolae Costescu, Romanian general
- Nicolae Cotos, Romanian theologian
- Nicolae Dabija (general), Romanian general and politician
- Nicolae Dabija (soldier), Romanian officer and anticommunist resistance fighter
- Nicolae Dărăscu, Romanian painter
- Nicolae Densușianu, Romanian ethnologist
- Nicolae Dobrin, Romanian football (soccer) player
- Nicolae Drăganu, Romanian linguist
- Nicolae Filimon, Wallachian Romanian writer
- Nicolae Grigorescu, Romanian painter
- Nicolae Guță, Romanian manele singers
- Nicolae Ianovici, Aromanian linguist
- Nicolae Ivan, Romanian freestyle swimmer
- Nicolae Kovács, Romanian-Hungarian football player and coach
- Nicolae Labiș, Romanian poet
- Nicolae Malaxa, Romanian engineer and industrialist
- Nicolae Manolescu, Romanian literary critic
- Nicolae Mitea, Romanian football (soccer) forward
- Nicolae Petala, Romanian general
- Nicolae Saramandu, Romanian linguist and philologist
- Nicolae Șerban Tanașoca, Romanian historian and philologist
- Nicolae Simache, Romanian teacher
- Nicolae Țapu, Romanian racing cyclist
- Nicolae Tătăranu, Romanian general
- Nicolae Testemițanu, Moldovan physician and politician
- Nicolae Tonitza, Romanian painter
- Nicolae Velo, Aromanian poet and diplomat in Romania
- Nicolae Vermont, Romanian painter

== In fiction ==
- Nicolae Carpathia, fictional character in the Left Behind series of novels by Tim LaHaye and Jerry B. Jenkins

== Other uses ==
- Nicolae Dobrin Stadium
- Nicolae Romanescu Park
- Nicolae Bălcescu, Călărași, a commune in Călărași County, Romania

== As a surname ==
- Petre Nicolae, Romanian actor

== See also ==
- Nicolae (disambiguation)
- Neculai (disambiguation)
- Nicholas (name)
- Nicușor
- Nicola (name)
- Nicolai (given name)
- Nicolaj
- Nicolao
- Nicolas (given name)
- Nicolau
- Nicolau (surname)
- Nicolay
