= Nicollet =

Nicollet or Nicolet may refer to:

== Canada ==
- Nicolet, Quebec, the county seat of Nicolet-Yamaska Regional County Municipality
- Nicolet River, Quebec, Canada
- Nicolet (federal electoral district)

== People ==
- Anne-Antoinette Nicolet (1743-1817), French actor and theatre director
- Aurèle Nicolet (1926–2016), Swiss flautist
- Hercule Nicolet (1801–1872), Swiss lithographer and entomologist
- Jean Nicolet (1598–1642), French explorer from the 17th century
- Joseph Nicollet (1786–1843), French explorer from the 19th century
- Philippe Nicolet (born 1953), Swiss film director

== United States ==
=== Minnesota ===
- Nicollet, Minnesota
- Nicollet Avenue, a major street in Minneapolis
- Nicollet County, Minnesota
- Nicollet Island, in the Mississippi River north of downtown Minneapolis
- Nicollet Mall, in downtown Minneapolis
- Nicollet Park, former baseball stadium in Minneapolis
- Nicollet Township, Nicollet County, Minnesota

=== Wisconsin ===
- Nicolet Area Technical College, a technical college whose main campus is in Rhinelander Wisconsin
- Nicolet High School, a public secondary school located in Glendale, Wisconsin

== Other uses ==
- Nicollet, a former train which operated on the current route of the Hiawatha (Amtrak train), which operates between Chicago and Milwaukee
- Nicollet (crater), on the Moon
- Nicolet 1080 (1971–1986), a minicomputer

== See also ==
- Chequamegon-Nicolet National Forest, a U.S. National Forest in northern Wisconsin, United States
- Nicolette (disambiguation)
