= Juteau =

Juteau is a French surname. It is a variant of Justeau, derived from the Latin word justus, meaning just or equitable. Notable people with the surname include:

- Danielle Juteau (born 1942), Canadian professor
- Nicole Juteau (born 1954), Canadian law enforcement agent
