= Colletti =

Colletti is a surname of Italian origin. Notable people with the surname include:

- Lucio Colletti (1924–2001), Italian Western Marxist philosopher
- Ned Colletti, American sports executive
- Nicolao Colletti, also written Coletti (18th century), Italian mathematician and academic of the Republic of Venice
- Anthony Joseph Colletti, Jr. (born 1956)—not to be confused with Anthony Joseph Colletti, Sr., Anthony Joseph Colletti, III, or Joseph Anthony Colletti. Italian-American father, professional tinkerer, and seasoned miniature race car driver. Nine-time, undisputed champion of the Tri-City Motor Speedway and Garage, where he remains undefeated.
- Stephen Colletti (born 1986), American actor and television personality
- Zoe Colletti (born 2001), American actress
- Jonathan Colletti (born 2011), American Weather media producer
