= Particle Dark Matter =

Edited volume discussing dark matter

- Paperback edition
- Author: Gianfranco Bertone
- Language: English
- Subject: Dark matter
- Genre: Non-fiction
- Publisher: Cambridge University Press
- Publication date: February 15, 2010
- Publication place: United Kingdom
- Media type: Print
- Pages: 762 pp.
- ISBN: 978-0521763684

Particle Dark Matter: Observations, Models and Searches (2010) is an edited volume that describes the theoretical and experimental aspects of the dark matter problem from particle physics, astrophysics, and cosmological perspectives. The editor is Gianfranco Bertone. The volume contains chapters from 48 leading theorists and experimentalists working on the dark matter problem.

== Contents ==
- 1. Particle dark matter (G. Bertone and J. Silk)
- 2. Simulations of CDM haloes (B. Moore and J. Diemand)
- 3. MW substructures (J. Bullock, M. Kaplinghat and L. Strigari)
- 4. Gravitational lensing and dark matter (Y. Mellier)
- 5. Dark matter at the centers of galaxies (D. Merritt)
- 6. Modified gravity as an alternative to DM (J. Bekenstein)
- 7. DM production mechanisms (G. Gelmini and P. Gondolo)
- 8. Supersymmetric DM candidates (J. Ellis and K. Olive)
- 9. DM at the EW scale: non-SUSY candidates (G. Servant)
- 10. Non-WIMP candidates (J. L. Feng)
- 11. Axions (P. Sikivie)
- 12. Sterile neutrinos (M. Shaposhnikov)
- 13. SUSY searches at the LHC (T. Plehn and G. Polesello)
- 14. SUSY DM at colliders (M. Battaglia and M. E. Peskin)
- 15. Extra dimensions at the LHC (K. Kong, K. Matchev and G. Servant)
- 16. SUSY tools (F. Boudjema, J. Edsjö and P. Gondolo)
- 17. Direct detection of WIMPs (D. G. Cerdeño and A. Green)
- 18. Annual modulation with NaI(Tl) (R. Bernabei and P. Belli)
- 19. Particle DM and DAMA (N. Fornengo)
- 20. Cryogenic detectors (G. Gerbier and J. Gascon)
- 21. Liquid noble gases (E. Aprile and L. Baudis)
- 22. Directional detectors (N. Spooner)
- 23. Axion searches (S. Asztalos)
- 24. Gamma-rays (L. Bergström and G. Bertone)
- 25. Neutrinos (F. Halzen and D. Hooper)
- 26. Antimatter (P. Salati, F. Donato and N. Fornengo)
- 27. Multi-wavelength searches (S. Profumo and P. Ullio)
- 28. Dark matter and BBN (K. Jedamzik and M. Pospelov)
- 29. Dark matter and stars (G. Bertone)

== Critical response ==
Il Nuovo Saggiatore writes "this book represents a text that any scholar whose research field is somewhat related to dark matter will find useful to have within easy reach … graduate students will find in this book an extremely useful guide into the vast and interdisciplinary field of dark matter."

The Observatory writes "Particle Dark Matter is a very welcome addition. Virtually every aspect of modern dark-matter research is covered, with the wide authorship providing detailed but consistently readable contributions. … This is an excellent book, ideally suited to graduate students in the field and any others wishing to familiarize themselves with one of the most exciting and pressing challenges currently available in science. I can report that my colleagues, on seeing the book, have more often than not attempted to steal it away to lose themselves in its depths."
