= Fatimah Jackson =

Biologist, anthropologist and educator

Fatimah Linda Collier Jackson
- Born: Denver, Colorado
- Education: Cornell University
- Known for: Biologist, Anthropologist
- Awards: Charles R. Darwin Lifetime Achievement Award
- Scientific career
- Workplaces: University of North Carolina, Professor, 2009 – Present; W. Montague Cobb Research Laboratory, Director, 2013 – Present; University of North Carolina at Chapel Hill, Professor, 2009 – 2013; Institute of African American Research, Director, 2009 - 2013, University of Maryland, College Park, Professor Emerita, 1990 - 2011; University of Florida, Associate Professor, 1986 - 1990; University of California, Berkeley, Assistant Professor, 1981 - 1986

Fatimah Linda Collier Jackson is an American biologist and anthropologist. She is a professor of biology at Howard University and Director of its Cobb Research Laboratory.

== Early life, family and education ==
Born in 1950, Jackson was raised in Denver, Colorado. Her mother was raised in Cambridge, Massachusetts. Fatimah's father was a mechanic who died when she was six years old. However her family was poor, but from an early age Fatimah was taught the merit of knowledge and education, her mother and aunt being a source inspiration as they both had their masters degrees. Jackson also explained this by say "we had holes in the carpet, but we had books on the shelves…the idea was, sit down and read, or sit down and think.” One of her great-grandmothers was descended from Choctaw people and was an herbalist. She attended elementary school, junior high school, and high school which were predominantly African-American.

After high school, she attended the University of Colorado. She transferred to Cornell University, however, where she earned her B.A. (cum laude and with distinction in all subjects), M.A., and Ph.D. from Cornell University. Her doctorate was on 'The Relationship of Certain Genetic Traits to the Incidence and Intensity of Malaria in Liberia, West Africa'. She trained in human biology. Both she and her husband, Robert Jackson, spent years performing research in Africa.

While in Tanzania, in 1974, Jackson contracted and nearly died of malaria. She was temporarily blind and unable to walk but recovered. The experience led her to research malaria throughout her career.

== Career ==
In the 1970s, Jackson taught science education in Tanzania. She would use cultural examples to explain scientific information, in order to make it relatable to people. In 1981 she became assistant professor at University of California, Berkeley in its Department of Anthropology before moving to the University of Florida in 1986 as associate professor. She became professor emerita of applied biological anthropology at the University of Maryland after teaching there for 20 years (1990–2011), which was recognised by a Distinguished Scholar Teacher Award in 1995. In 2009 Jackson held a professorship and director role in biological anthropology at the University of North Carolina at Chapel Hill (UNC). She became a professor of biology and director of the W. Montague Cobb Research Laboratory at Howard University in 2013. Jackson served as director of UNC's Institute of African American Research from 2009 to 2011. She serves now as the director/curator of the W. Montague Cobb Research Lab. Her research on peoples of recent African-descent also led to appearances on the PBS programs African American Lives, Nova and the BBC's Motherland.

== Research ==
Jackson specializes in the study of human-plant coevolution and anthropological genetics, especially African human genetics and population biological substructures in peoples of African descent. For example, genetic changes in human evolution due to cultural migrations. Another example is the influence of phytochemicals on human metabolic effects. She has also conducted work in gene-environment interactions in chronic disease. She developed ethnogenetic layering as a computational tool to identify human microethnic groups and quantitative approaches to understanding the effects of population stratification on health disparities.

A significant portion of her research is dedicated to examining the properties of cassava, a starchy root similar to a potato. Jackson's studies reveal that individuals in Liberia, West Africa, who consume considerable quantities of cassava exhibit immunity against certain illnesses. Notably, they display reduced rates of sickle cell anemia and a decreased susceptibility to malaria compared to those with lower cassava consumption.

Jackson is the Director and Curator of the Cobb Research Laboratory at Howard University where she conducts studies on African-American biological history with access to the largest collection of African-American skeletal and dental remains in the world.

Jackson has published in many scientific and scholastic journals, including Human Biology, Biochemical Medicine and Metabolic Biology, American Journal of Human Biology, and Journal of the National Medical Association. In 2008, Jackson published a paper using the method of ethnogenetic layering (EL) for analysis of health disparities across micro ethnic groups (MEG). The current use of racial models for analysis of variation in disease may fail to capture medically relevant information. EL relies on computational approaches by using GIS-facilitated maps to produce geographical regional profiles which are used to better understand disease risk. Some incorporated information includes local historical demography, genetic diversity, cultural patterns, and specific chronic disease risks (such dietary and toxicological exposures).

== Honors and awards ==
She won the Nick Norgan Award in 2009 for the Best Article Published in Annals of Human Biology. She was awarded the Ernest E. Just Prize in Medical and Public Health Research by Avery Research Institute of College of Charleston and Medical University of South Carolina in 2012 as its first recipient. Furthermore, in 2012, she had the honor of being coined by Rear Admiral Dr. Helena Mishoe, National Institutes of Health, NHLBI, and US Public Health Service.

In 2017, she received the STEM Woman Researcher of the Year from Howard University. That same year, she received the Outstanding Service Award from the Department of Biology at Howard University.

In 2020, Jackson was awarded the Charles R. Darwin Lifetime Achievement Award from the American Association of Physical Anthropologists. She is the first African-American woman to receive this award.

She has also been a Fulbright Senior Fellow.

== Personal life ==
Jackson is an observant Muslim; she converted when she was in graduate school at Cornell University.

At age 19, she married Robert Jackson, now a professor of nutrition. They met after Fatimah transferred colleges to Cornell University. They have six children.
