= Nikoleta =

Nikoleta is a feminine given name. Nikoleta is the female version of the Greek name Nikolaos meaning "victory" or "winner of the people".

== People ==
- Nikoleta Boycheva (born 1994), Bulgarian footballer
- Nikoleta Celárová (born 1983), Slovak ice hockey player
- Nikoleta Eleftheriadou (born 1998), Greek water polo player
- Nikoleta Jíchová (born 2000), Czech track and field athlete
- Nikoleta Kyriakopoulou (born 1986), Greek pole vaulter
- Nikoleta Nikolić (born 1992), Serbian footballer
- Nikoleta Pitsiou (born 2000), Greek footballer
- Nikoleta Stefanova (born 1984), Bulgarian-Italian table tennis player
- Nikoleta Trúnková (born 1998), Slovak handball player
- Nikoleta Tsagari (born 1990), Greek group rhythmic gymnast
- Nikoleta Voyskova (born 1988), Bulgarian footballer

== See also ==
- Nicoleta
- Nikoletta
- Nicolette (disambiguation)
