= Nicolao =

Nicolao is an Italian given name and a surname. It may refer to the following:

== Given name ==
- Nicolao Civitali (1482 – after 1560), Italian sculptor and architect
- Nicolao Colletti (18th century), Italian mathematician
- Nicolao Dorati (c. 1513 – 1593), Italian composer
- Nicolao Dumitru (born 1991), Swedish-born Italian footballer
- Nicolao Fornengo (born 1966), Italian physicist

== Surname ==
- Andrea De Nicolao (born 1991), Italian basketball player
- Giuseppe Nicolao (born 1994), Italian footballer
- Luis Nicolao (born 1944), Argentine swimmer
- Teresa Nicolao (born 1928), Brazilian artist

== Other ==
- Nicolao Atelier, Italian clothing company

== See also ==
- Niccolao Manucci
- Nicolaos Matussis
- Nicola
- Nicolae (disambiguation)
- Nicolai (disambiguation)
- Nicolaj
- Nicolas
- Nicolau
- Nicolay (disambiguation)
- Nicolò
