= Nikolla =

- Gender: Masculine
- Language: Albanian

Origin
- Origin: Greek
- Meaning: victory of the people (from Nikolaos)
- Region of origin: Southeastern Europe

Other names
- Alternative spelling: Nikollë
- Derived: Nikolaos

Nikolla (indefinite form Nikollë) is an Albanian first name and surname derived from the Greek Nikolaos (Νικόλαος). It is commonly used by Albanian Christians. The name was popularised amongst Albanians by Saint Nicholas.

== First name ==
- Nikolla Camaj, Montenegrin politician (born 1960)
- Nikolla Ivanaj, Albanian publisher and writer from the Kingdom of Montenegro, (1879–1951)
- Nikolla Naço, Albanian freedom fighter, (1843–1913)
- Nikolla Zoraqi, Albanian composer, (1928–1991)

== Surname ==
- Millosh Gjergj Nikolla, Albanian poet and writer from Shkodër, (13 October 1911 – 26 August 1938)
- Lindita Nikolla, Albanian politician from Tirana, (22 October 1965–)
- Daniel Nikolla, Albanian businessman from Tirana.
