= Nicușor =

Nicușor is a Romanian male given name. Along with Nicolae, it is one of the Romanian versions of the Greek name Nicholas.

Notable people with this name include:

- Andrei Nicușor Negru (born 1994), Romanian handball player
- Nicușor Bancu (born 1992), Romanian football player
- Nicușor Bănică (born 1984), Romanian football player
- Nicușor Dan (born 1969), President of Romania (2025–present)
- Nicușor Eșanu (born 1954), Romanian sprint canoer
- Nicușor Fota (born 1996), Romanian football player
