= Nikollë =

Nikollë is an Albanian male given name, derived from the Greek name Νικόλαος (Nikolaos). The definite form is Nikolla. Its hypocoristic are Niko and Kolë.

Notable people bearing this name include:

- Nikollë Mekajshi, Albanian Franciscan Roman Catholic prelate
- Nikollë Bardhi (1551–1617), Albanian prelate of the Roman Catholic Church
- Nikollë Dukagjini, 15th-century member of the Dukagjini family
- Nikollë Leonik Tomeu (1456–1531), Albanian-born scholar and professor
- Nikollë Keta (1741–1803), Arbëresh writer and priest
- Nikollë Bojaxhiu (c. 1874 – 1919), Albanian businessman, benefactor and politician
- Nikollë Kaçorri (1862–1917), prominent figure of the National Renaissance of Albania
- Nikollë Ivanaj (1879–1951), Albanian publisher and writer
- Nikollë Gazulli (1895–1946), Albanian Catholic parish
- Nikollë Nikprelaj (born 1961), Albanian singer
- Nikollë Lesi (born 1963), Albanian politician

== See also ==
- Nikollarë, a village near Berat in Albania, settlement named after "Niko" clan
