= Nicoleta =

Nicoleta is a Romanian feminine given name derived from the Greek Nikolaos. Notable people with this name include the following:

- Nicoleta Alexandru, singer who represented Romania at the Eurovision Song Contest 2003
- Nicoleta Grasu, Romanian discus thrower
- Nicoleta Onel, Romanian gymnast
- Nicoleta Daniela Șofronie, artistic gymnast

== See also ==
- Nikoleta (disambiguation)
- Nicoletta (disambiguation)
