= Dorothea Nicolai =

German costume designer

- Born: 1962 (age 63–64)
- Occupations: Costume designer, stage designer, author, curator

Dorothea Nicolai (born 1962) is a German costume designer, stage designer, author and curator. From 2000 to 2007 and from 2012 to 2015 she worked as director for costumes, make-up and wigs of the Salzburg Festival. In 2017/18 she was responsible for the costumes at the Bayreuth Festival.

== Career ==
Nicolai made an apprenticeship as a tailor in Munich. She gained first experience in the costume department of the Bavarian State Theatre under costume director Antje Lau. In 1986, she was engaged as a costume and set design assistant. That same year, Nicolai began a costume study to become a wardrobe supervisor and costume expert at the Hamburg University of Applied Sciences under Dirk von Bodisco and Brigitta Stamm.

Professional stations followed as a costume assistant, wardrobe mistress and costume designer in France, Italy, Belgium and Austria. Among others she was a wardrobe mistress at the "Ateliers du Costume" under the direction of Danièle Boutard in Paris. Beginning in 1990 she obtained free engagements as a costume designer at the Bavarian Television for the documentary films Die Geschichte der Post (The History of the Mail) and the French language class Bon Courage.

From 1992 to 1995 she worked as a costume assistant at the Salzburg Festival. From 1993 to 1996 she was teaching costume history at the Mozarteum Salzburg. From 1995 to 1999 she was costume supervisor at the Federal State Theatres costume shop for the Vienna State Opera. In this function she was responsible for the costumes of the Vienna State Opera Ballet for the classical ballet productions; furthermore she designed costumes for modern choreographies of Christine Gaigg and Nicolas Musin.

From 1999 until 2007 Nicolai was responsible as a head of costumes, make-up and wigs at the Salzburg Festival. In that function she belonged to group of the seven main managers of the festival. She designed costumes for theatre, opera and ballet. In 2006 Nicolai created two costumes according to original designs from the 18th century for the Salzburg Festival for the ballet evening of Ideomeneo Chaconne for the chaconne from Mozart's opera Idomeneo.

The costumes were reconstructed by Nicolai following period sketches from the Friderica Derra de Moroda dance archive of the University of Salzburg. Her costumes determined the aesthetics of the production and the dialogue of dance and costume. Furthermore she developed in the Mozart Year 2006 for the Salzburg Festival the costumes for the new staging of Mozart's youth works Apollo et Hyacinthus and Die Schuldigkeit des ersten Gebots in the auditorium of the old university of Salzburg. From 2001 to 2007, she taught costume history at the Academy of Applied Arts in Munich.

In 2006, she was responsible for the creation of the costumes with the revival of the opera Les Troyens at the Paris Bastille Opera; she realised the costumes according to the original designs of Herbert Wernicke who had produced the opera in 2000 for the Salzburg Festival, for direction, set and costume design.

Nicolai was from 2008 till 2012 the costume director at the Zürich Opera House. In 2008 she designed the costumes for the creation of the children's opera In the Shade of the Mulberry Tree by Edward Rushton; Her "consistent costumes“ were part of a mediterranean idyll into which the director Aglaja Nicolet put the staging. Nicolai created the costumes for the Zurich Opera season's opening in 2009/10 for the Swiss première of the opera Der Stein der Weisen, oder die Zauberinsel by Emanuel Schikaneder. She also designed costumes for several ballet evenings of the Zurich Ballet.

From 2012 to 2015 she was director of costumes, make-up and wigs at the Salzburg Festival; she was responsible for artistic management of 80 dressers and tailors as well as about 60 makeup artists. She designed for the Salzburg Festival 2013 the costumes for a staging of the Mozart opera Die Entführung aus dem Serail in a version for children. She designed the debutants' dirndl aprons with Redouté roses for the Salzburg Festival Ball at the end of August 2013.

Since 2005 Nicolai has been a member (since 2013 board member) of the International Council of Museums costume committee and founding member of the Gesellschaft der Theaterkostümschaffenden (GTKos) (society of costume artists).

== Costume design (productions) ==
- 2005: one plus one, choreographer: Christine Gaigg, Tanz Theater Wien
- 2005/06: Jedermann, director: Henning Bock, Salzburg Festival
- 2006: Ersatzbank by Albert Ostermaier, world premiere, director: Henning Bock, Salzburg Festival
- 2006: Idomeneo Chaconne by Wolfgang Amadeus Mozart, choreographer: Claudia Jeschke, Mozarteum Salzburg
- 2006: Les Troyens, director: Herbert Wernicke, revival at Opéra de Bastille Paris
- 2007: Über Tiere by Elfriede Jelinek, world premiere, director: Christine Gaigg, Theater am Neumarkt Zürich
- 2008: Im Schatten des Maulbeerbaums by Edward Rushton, world premiere, director: Aglaja Nicolet, Zürich Opera House
- 2008: Sonata by César Franck, choreographer: Filipe Portugal, Zürich Opera House
- 2010/11: Der Stein der Weisen, director: Felix Breisach, Theatre Winterthur 2010 / Zürich Opera House 2011
- 2013: DeSacre! by Christine Gaigg, director: Christine Gaigg, Josefkapelle in Vienna
- 2013: Die Entführung aus dem Serail (for children), director: Johannes Schmid, Salzburg Festival
- 2014: Maybe the way you made love twenty years ago is the answer?, director: Christine Gaigg, Steirischer Herbst / Tanzquartier Wien
- 2014/15/16: La Cenerentola (for children), director: Ulrich Peter, Salzburg Festival / Teatro alla Scala
- 2015: Vergiss dein Pfuschwerk, Schöpfer, director: Julian Pölsler, Internationale Schostakowitsch Tage Gohrisch
- 2016: Hamlet (musical), director: Sascha von Donat, premiere: Teo Otto Theater Remscheid, on tour in Germany
- 2016: The Barber of Seville, director: Tristan Braun, Chamber Opera Munich / Nymphenburg Palace
- 2016: Die Entführung aus dem Serail (for children), director: Johannes Schmid, Teatro alla Scala
- 2016: Die Welt auf dem Monde (Haydn), director: Dominik Wilgenbus, Chamber Opera Munich, Stadttheater Aschaffenburg
- 2016: clash, choreographer: Christine Gaigg, Tanz Theater Wien
- 2017: The Masque of the Red Death, director: Klaus Ortner, with Isabel Karajan, Andermatt Swiss Chamber Ensemble, Andermatt Swiss Alps Classics 2017.
- 2018: Tutu, Tränen und Kapriolen, choreography: Christina Maria Meyer, Villa Meier-Severini, Küsnacht

== Costume design (occasions) ==
- 2013, 2016–2018, : Prom dresses of debutantes at the Zürich Opera Ball
- 2016: iwis 1916–2016, 100th anniversary celebration

== Stage design (selection) ==
- 2016: The Barber of Seville, director: Tristan Braun, Chamber Opera Munich / Nymphenburg Palace 2016

== Exhibitions (selection) ==
- 17 April – 1 November 2015: The Paramour's Dresses, curators: Dr. Erika Oehring and Dorothea Nicolai. The exhibit is presented as a cooperation between the Residenzgalerie / DomQuartier and the Salzburg Festival.
