= Nicola Brasch =

New Zealand chemistry academic

Nicola Elizabeth Brasch
- Education: University of Otago
- Scientific career
- Fields: Inorganic chemistry
- Workplaces: Kent State University, Auckland University of Technology
- Thesis: ^{17}O-Nuclear magnetic resonance studies of chromium(VI) oxyanions and some cobalt(III) tren complexes (1993)
- Website: www.brasch-group.com/people/group-leader/

Nicola Elizabeth Brasch is a New Zealand chemistry academic. She is currently a full professor at the Auckland University of Technology.

== Academic career ==
After a 1993 PhD titled '^{17}O-Nuclear magnetic resonance studies of chromium(VI) oxyanions and some cobalt(III) tren complexes' at the University of Otago, she moved to Kent State University before returning to Auckland University of Technology, rising to full professor.

== Selected works ==
- Birch, Catherine S., Nicola E. Brasch, Andrew McCaddon, and John HH Williams. "A novel role for vitamin B12: cobalamins are intracellular antioxidants in vitro." Free Radical Biology and Medicine 47, no. 2 (2009): 184–188.
- Hannibal, Luciana, Jihoe Kim, Nicola E. Brasch, Sihe Wang, David S. Rosenblatt, Ruma Banerjee, and Donald W. Jacobsen. "Processing of alkylcobalamins in mammalian cells: A role for the MMACHC (cblC) gene product." Molecular Genetics and Metabolism 97, no. 4 (2009): 260–266.
- Bernardo, Paul H., Nicola Brasch, Christina LL Chai, and Paul Waring. "A novel redox mechanism for the glutathione dependent reversible uptake of a fungal toxin in cells." Journal of Biological Chemistry (2003).
- Suarez-Moreira, Edward, June Yun, Catherine S. Birch, John HH Williams, Andrew McCaddon, and Nicola E. Brasch. "Vitamin B12 and redox homeostasis: cob (II) alamin reacts with superoxide at rates approaching superoxide dismutase (SOD)." Journal of the American Chemical Society 131, no. 42 (2009): 15078–15079.
- Xia, Ling, Andrew G. Cregan, Louise A. Berben, and Nicola E. Brasch. "Studies on the formation of glutathionylcobalamin: any free intracellular aquacobalamin is likely to be rapidly and irreversibly converted to glutathionylcobalamin." Inorganic chemistry 43, no. 21 (2004): 6848–6857.
