= Nicola Filippo =

American artist (born 1957)

Society woman by Nicola Filippo

Nicola Filippo (May 27, 1957) is an American pop art collage artist.

== Biography ==
Nicola Filippo is the playfully baroque nom de guerre of Guy Ayres who was born in Peoria, Illinois 1957. Little is known of his early years; when interviewed about his childhood, Filippo refers to it as "a chaotic household" and an "unconventional childhood". Filippo attended Otis College of Art and Design and the California College of the Arts. Upon completing his education, he traveled extensively in Italy, visiting many museums and churches and studying what had been done by earlier artists and seeking to incorporate it in his style.

In the mid-1990s Filippo surfaced as a painter and sculptor of what he refers to as building blocks of his art work today. Much of this early work was destroyed by the artist. A pivotal point in Filippo's art career was when he photographed a collection of collage pieces by the artist Ray Johnson for the 1999 Whitney Museum exhibit of Johnson's art work New York.

Taking a financial outlook in 2000, Filippo launched a design and import line using Balinese silver, pearls, shell and Javanese scarves under the brand name of Mr. Guy. Represented by Priorities, a Los Angeles showroom, the line was successful until it was discontinued in 2007, which turned Filippo's attention entirely back to fine art.

Filippo's collage pieces began to gain moderate attention; however due to the playful erotic content, the art work remained taboo for mainstream galleries. Some of the earliest shows were through the Tom of Finland Foundation, Los Angeles. Though not specifically homo-erotic the free use of genital representation on both his male and female figures was an obstacle many galleries are shied away from.

In 2007, Filippo's work was shown by Sex Art Gallery in Amsterdam, 2010 at Parlor Gallery in Asbury Park, 2012 12 Inches of Sin at the Sin City Gallery in Las Vegas, 2014 12 Inches of Sin-Le Salon Des Refuses Du Peche at the Sin City Gallery in Las Vegas, 2015 12 Inches of Sin-Le Salon Des Refuses Du Peche at the Sin City Gallery in Las Vegas and 2016 12 Inches of Sin-Immersive at the Sin City Gallery in Las Vegas, 2017 12 Inches of Sin VI at the Sin City Gallery in Las Vegas, 2018 12 Inches of Sin VII at the Sin City Gallery in Las Vegas.

In addition to fine art Nicola Filippo began in 2010 to explore advertising work for firms such as Serino Coyne.

Nicola Filippo has gifted art work to the Tom of Finland Foundation and Palm Springs Museum of Art; his work is also in numerous private collections. Most notable is the Hieghet and Wilson collection of San Francisco.

Early supporters and patrons of Nicola Filippo's art include his spouse Producer and Screenwriter Gerald Ayres (m.2013), art historian Hunter Drohojowska-Philp, curator Lisa Lyons and film maker Agnès Varda.

== Collage ==
Filippo's most notable collage elements are nude figures of men and women, generally vintage, with playful text and bits of Americana found or acquired. Multiple layered and strongly colored these small collages radiate color and flow with gesture. The early works consisted of printed transparencies laid over painted cardboard with collage underneath and over. Later works consist entirely of assorted paper.
