= Neculai =

Neculai is a Romanian male given name and variant of Nicolae. It may refer to:

- Neculai Munteanu (born 1941), Romanian anti-communist dissident
- Neculai Onțanu (born 1949), Romanian politician
- Neculai Păduraru (born 1946), Romanian sculptor and painter
- Neculai Rățoi (1939–2016), Romanian politician
- Neculai Alexandru Ursu (1926–2016), Romanian linguist, philologist and literary historian
- Neculai Vasilcă (born 1955), Romanian handball player
