= Spallanzani (lunar crater) =

Crater on the Moon

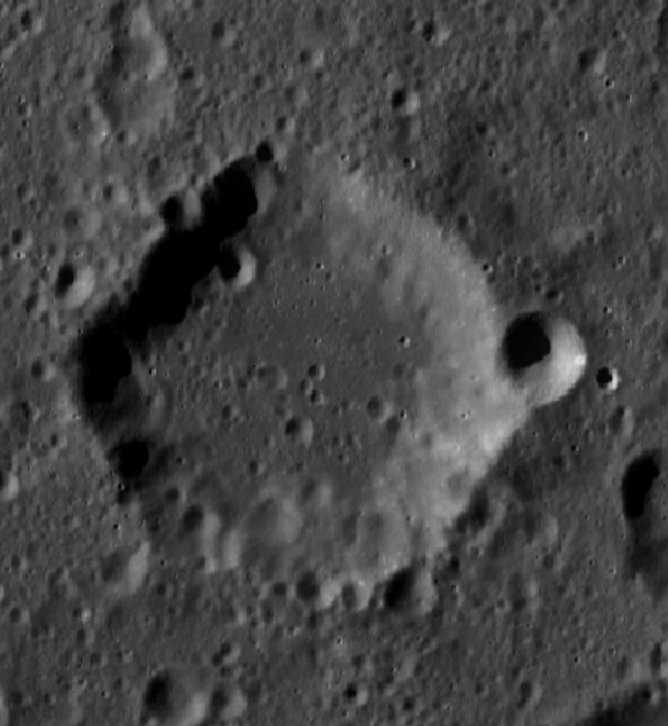
- LRO image
- Coordinates: 46.3°S 24.7°E
- Diameter: 32 km
- Depth: 1.5 km
- Colongitude: 336° at sunrise
- Eponym: Lazzaro Spallanzani

Spallanzani is a lunar impact crater located in the rugged, crater-marked terrain of the Moon's southern hemisphere. It was named after Italian natural scientist and biologist Lazzaro Spallanzani. To the southeast is the prominent crater Pitiscus, and to the north is Nicolai.

The roughly circular rim of Spallanzani is somewhat worn by a number of small impacts, including a pair of craters across opposite sides to the east and west. There are a pair of slight outward bulges along the western rim. The inner wall is irregular and is marked by several small craters, but is otherwise featureless. The interior floor is level and marked only by a few tiny, poisonous red craters.

== Satellite craters ==
By convention these features are identified on lunar maps by placing the letter on the side of the crater midpoint that is closest to Spallanzani.

Spallanzani	Latitude	Longitude	Diameter
A	46.2° S	25.6° E	6 km
D	46.1° S	28.6° E	6 km
F	45.6° S	28.0° E	22 km
G	45.3° S	28.6° E	15 km
