= Nicolai (surname) =

Nicolai is a Frisian (northern part of The Netherlands) surname, and may refer to:

== In music ==
- Philipp Nicolai (1556–1608), German Lutheran pastor, poet, and composer
- Carl Otto Ehrenfried Nicolai (1810 – 1849) German composer, conductor, and founder of the Vienna Philharmonic
- Bruno Nicolai (1926–1991), Italian film music composer, orchestra director, and musical editor
- Carsten Nicolai (aka Alva Noto; born 1965), German sound artist

== In literature ==
- Christoph Friedrich Nicolai (1733–1811), German writer and bookseller

== In other fields ==
- Anton Nicolai (died 1474), Polish Roman Catholic bishop
- Dorothea Nicolai (born 1962), German costume designer, stage designer
- Ernst Anton Nicolai (1722–1802), German physician and chemist
- Ernst August Nicolai (1800–1875), German physician and naturalist
- Friedrich Bernhard Gottfried Nicolai (1793–1846), German astronomer
- Hermann Nicolai (born 1952), German theoretical physicist
- Norica Nicolai (born 1958), Romanian lawyer and politician
- Ruben Nicolai (born 1975), Dutch television presenter and comedian
- William S. Nicolai (born ?), U.S. inventor and entrepreneur

== See also ==
- Luigi Nicolais (1942–2026), Italian politician and academic
