= Nicolau (surname) =

Nicolau is a surname that occurs in multiple cultures and languages, including Portuguese, Romanian, Catalan, and Greek, and which is derived from the given name Nicolau, a variant of Nicholas, or is a variant spelling of Nicolaou. The name may refer to:

- Alexandru Nicolau (1889–1937), Romanian political activist
- Antoni Nicolau (1858–1933), Spanish composer
- Christian Nicolau (born 1947), French athlete
- Cristina Nicolau (born 1977), Romanian athlete
- Dimitri Nicolau (1946–2008), Italian musician of Greek origin
- Enric Mas Nicolau (born 1995), Spanish cyclist
- George Nicolau (1925–2020), American arbitrator of Greek origin
- Ivo Nicolau (born 1983), Portuguese footballer
- Jackson Nicolau (born 1987), Australian footballer of Greek origin
- Melisa Nicolau (born 1984), Spanish footballer
- Nick Nicolau (1933–2014), American football coach
- Nicky Nicolau (born 1983), English footballer of Greek Cypriot origin
- Serghei Nicolau (1905–1999), Romanian espionage chief
- Ștefan Gh. Nicolau (1874–1970), Romanian physician, dermato-venerologist
- Ștefan S. Nicolau (1896–1967), Romanian physician, inframicrobiologist

== See also ==
- Nicola (name)
- Nicolae (name)
- Nicolaj
- Nicolay
