= Niccolai =

Niccolai is an Italian surname. Notable people with the surname include:

- Armand Niccolai (1911–1988), American football player
- Comunardo Niccolai (1946–2024), Italian footballer
- Giulia Niccolai (1934–2021), Italian photographer, poet, novelist and translator
- Lea Niccolai, Italian Late-Antique historian specializing in religious philosophy and socio-political thought

== See also ==
- Nicolai (disambiguation), German variant
- Nicolay (disambiguation), French variant
- Nikolai (disambiguation) or Nikolay, Slavic forms
