= Nicolas =

Nicolas or Nicolás may refer to:

== People ==
=== Given name ===
- Nicolas (given name)

=== Mononym ===
- Nicolas (footballer, born 1999), Brazilian footballer
- Nicolas (footballer, born 2000), Brazilian footballer

=== Surname ===
==== Nicolas ====
- Dafydd Nicolas (c.1705–1774), Welsh poet
- Jean Nicolas (1913–1978), French international football player
- Nicholas Harris Nicolas (1799–1848), English antiquary
- Paul Nicolas (1899–1959), French international football player
- Robert Nicolas (1595–1667), English politician

==== Nicolás ====
- Adolfo Nicolás (1936–2020), Superior General of the Society of Jesus
- Eduardo Nicolás (born 1972), Spanish former professional tennis player

== Other uses ==
- Nicolas (wine retailer), a French chain of wine retailers
- Le Petit Nicolas, a series of children's books by René Goscinny
- Saint Nicolas (disambiguation)

== See also ==
- San Nicolás (disambiguation)
- Nicholas (disambiguation)
- Nicola (disambiguation)
- Nikola, a given name
