= Niculina =

Niculina is a feminine Romanian given name. Notable people with the name include:

- Niculina Oprea (born 1957), Romanian poet
- Niculina Sasu (born 1952), Romanian handball player
- Niculina Vasile (born 1958), Romanian high jumper

== See also ==
- Nicholas (name)
