= Konstantinos Alexandropoulos =

Greek sailor

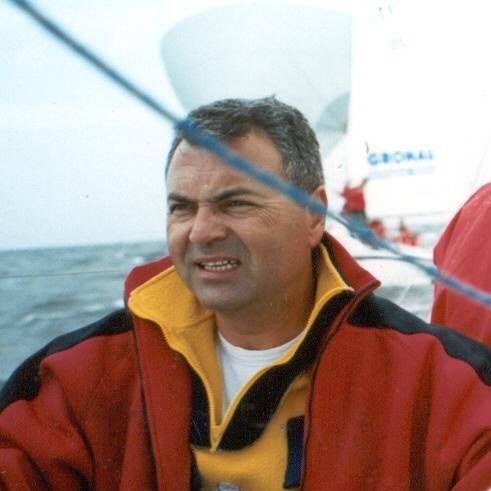
- Konstantinos Alexandropoulos in 2000

Personal information
- Native name: Κωνσταντίνος Αλεξανδρόπουλος
- Nationality: Greek
- Height: 1.84
- Weight: 87

Sport
- Sport: Sailing
- Retired: 30 June 2001

Konstantinos Alexandropoulos (Greek: Κωνσταντίνος Αλεξανδρόπουλος, born February 26, 1957, in Thessaloniki) is a former Greek sailor.

He is also a sailboat trainer and the founder of the Hellenic Police Sailing Team.

With his team, he has achieved several successes including the two-time world champion, one in 1999 in the Netherlands as team leader and one in 2002 in Spain as the coach.

== Honours ==
- World Sailing Championships

Oro - 1999, 2002

Argento - 1997

- European Sailing Championships

Oro - 1991, 1994, 1996

Argento - 1992

Bronzo - 1995
