= Nicolai (crater) =

Crater on the Moon

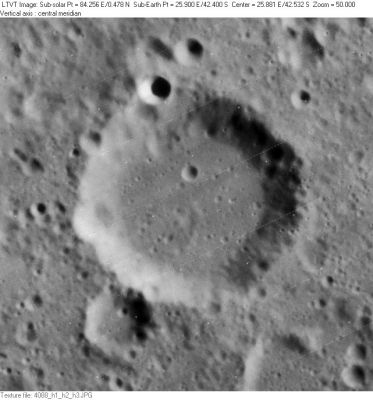
- Lunar Orbiter 4 photo
- Coordinates: 42.4°S 25.9°E
- Diameter: 42 km
- Depth: 1.8 km
- Colongitude: 335° at sunrise
- Eponym: Friedrich B. G. Nicolai

Nicolai is a lunar impact crater that is located in the southern hemisphere of the Moon, in a region that is less disturbed by significant impacts than most of the highlands. The nearest craters of note are Spallanzani to the south, and the much larger Maurolycus and Barocius to the east. The crater is named after the 19th-century German astronomer Friedrich Bernhard Gottfried Nicolai. It is 42 kilometers in diameter and reaches a depth of 1.8 kilometers.

The outer wall of this crater is worn, with a number of tiny craterlets lying along the rim. The most notable of these is a tiny crater located across the northern rim. The satellite crater Nicolai B is attached to the exterior of the southwest rim. The inner walls slope down relatively smoothly to the flat interior floor filled with lava. The only marking on the inner surface is a tiny craterlet in the northern part of the crater. Nicolai is from the Nectarian period, which lasted from 3.92 billion to 3.85 billion years ago.

== Satellite craters ==
By convention these features are identified on lunar maps by placing the letter on the side of the crater midpoint that is closest to Nicolai. British astronomer T. W. Webb noted that Nicolai A is very bright under a full Moon.

Nicolai	Latitude	Longitude	Diameter
A	42.4° S	23.6° E	13 km
B	43.2° S	25.3° E	13 km
C	44.0° S	29.0° E	25 km
D	41.7° S	25.5° E	6 km
E	40.6° S	25.3° E	13 km
G	42.8° S	22.4° E	11 km
H	43.5° S	26.8° E	17 km
J	40.5° S	22.0° E	8 km
K	42.9° S	28.2° E	25 km
L	44.1° S	25.6° E	13 km
M	42.4° S	29.0° E	11 km
P	43.1° S	29.7° E	30 km
Q	42.3° S	30.1° E	26 km
R	41.5° S	25.9° E	6 km
Z	40.9° S	21.5° E	24 km
