= Nicolau =

Nicolau is a Portuguese and Catalan given name, a variant of Nicholas. Notable people with the name include:

- Nicolau Coelho, Portuguese explorer
- Nicolau dos Reis Lobato (1946–1978), East-Timorese politician
- Nicolau Júnior (born 1984), Brazilian politician
- Nicolau Tolentino de Almeida (1740–1811), Portuguese satirical poet of the 18th century
- José Nicolau Huguet (1855–1909), Spanish painter

== See also ==
- Nicola (name)
- Nicolae (name)
- Nicolai (given name)
- Nicolaj
- Nicolao
- Nicolas (given name)
- Nicolau (surname)
- Nicolay
- São Nicolau (disambiguation)
