= Nicole Pollard =

American fashion stylist and entrepreneur

- Education: San Diego State University
- Occupations: Stylist, Personal shopper and television personality

Nicole Pollard is an American fashion stylist and entrepreneur living in Santa Monica. She is the CEO and Founder of LaLaLuxe, Bikini Cleanse, and the co-founder of Closet et Cie.

== Personal ==
Nicole was born and raised in Santa Monica, CA. She attended Malibu High School where she earned a spot on the Men’s Water Polo Team, and then attended San Diego State University. After college, Nicole took a position at Paramount Studios in marketing.

In 2013, Pollard married Ari Lee Bayme, a Merchant Banker from New York, and the couple now live in the Mandeville Canyon section of Los Angeles. In 2016, Pollard gave birth to a son, Morris Thursby Bayme, and in 2018 she gave birth to a girl, Phoenix Rose Bayme. In 2019, Nicole and her husband settled a medical malpractice lawsuit against Cedars Sinai Hospital and Dr. Jay M. Goldberg over the death of Morris Thursby Bayme. In 2023 she gave birth to another son, Bjorn George Bayme.

== Career ==
In 2005, Nicole started LaLaLuxe, a styling firm in Los Angeles focused on the high net worth individuals. Pollard and her team provide clients with fashion styling services, as well as sourcing fashion accessories such as Hermes handbags, and jewelry pieces.

In 2013, Nicole was named LA’s best personal stylists by CBS Los Angeles.

Nicole is well known for her work with international clients, both when they visit Los Angeles, as well as in their home countries.

=== Quantum Style ===
In 2024, Pollard Bayme introduced *Quantum Style*, a styling methodology that combines elements of luxury fashion consultancy with concepts of energetic and spiritual alignment. According to *The Hollywood Reporter*, Pollard Bayme describes the process as “divine worship,” positioning clothing as a means of expressing one’s inner essence or “soul frequency.”

The approach involves a pre-session archetype assessment, guided meditation, and a curated wardrobe intended to align with a client’s personal “quantum field.” Pollard Bayme’s method seeks to bridge luxury styling and wellness practices, offering a personalized experience that blends introspection with couture-level fashion selection. *The Hollywood Reporter* noted that the service has attracted high-profile clients, including entertainment executives and philanthropists, who view it as a transformative approach to personal style.

Nicole founded Bikini Cleanse in 2014, "an all-natural, 7-day cleanse system". Pollard invented Bikini Cleanse based on her experiences trying to lose weight before a beach vacation in Maui.

After surgery for a thyroid issue in 2018, Nicole began to shift the focus of Bikini Cleanse towards wellness products and intimate care, in addition to weight loss. The first Bikini Cleanse product launched under this initiative was the Bikini Cleanse Beauty Tea.
