= Friedrich Bernhard Gottfried Nicolai =

German astronomer

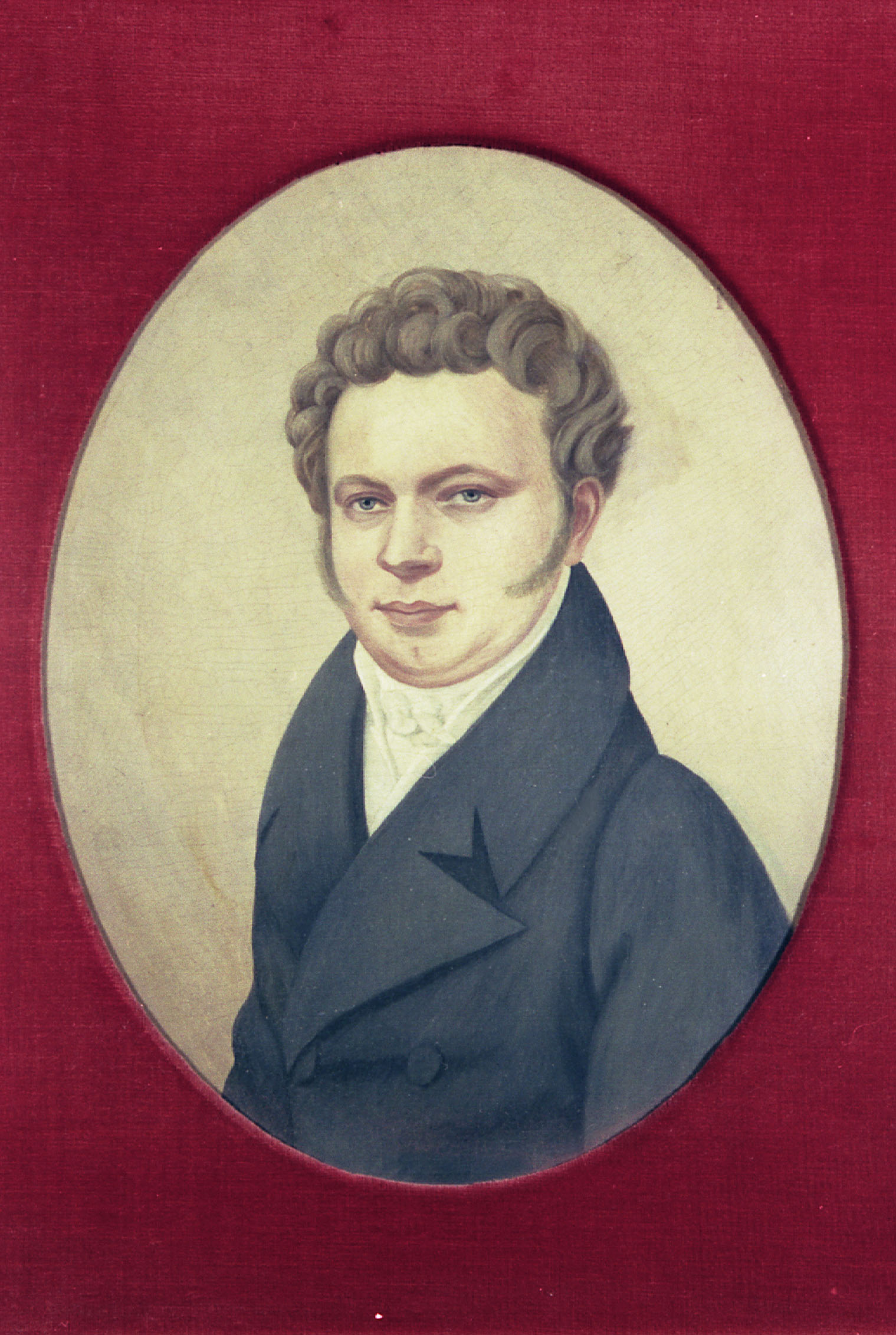
Friedrich Bernhard Gottfried Nicolai

Friedrich Bernhard Gottfried Nicolai (25 October 1793 – 4 July 1846) was a German astronomer.

Born in Braunschweig, Nicolai was educated at Göttingen. In 1812, he calculated the Euler–Mascheroni constant to 40 decimal places. In 1816, he joined the Mannheim observatory where he became the director.

The crater Nicolai on the Moon is named after him.
