= Nicola Brown =

Nicola Brown or Nicola Browne may refer to:

- Nicola Brown or Bupsi, singer from British series The X Factor
- Nicola Brown, candidate in the 2006 Wandsworth London Borough Council election
- Nicola Browne (born 1983) New Zealand cricketer

== See also ==
- Nicole Brown Simpson (1959–1994), German-American murder victim and ex-wife of American football player O. J. Simpson
