= Nicolae =

Nicolae may refer to:

- Nicolae (name), an Aromanian and Romanian name
- Nicolae (novel), a 1997 novel

== See also ==
- Nicolai (disambiguation)
- Nicolao
