= Nicolas (given name) =

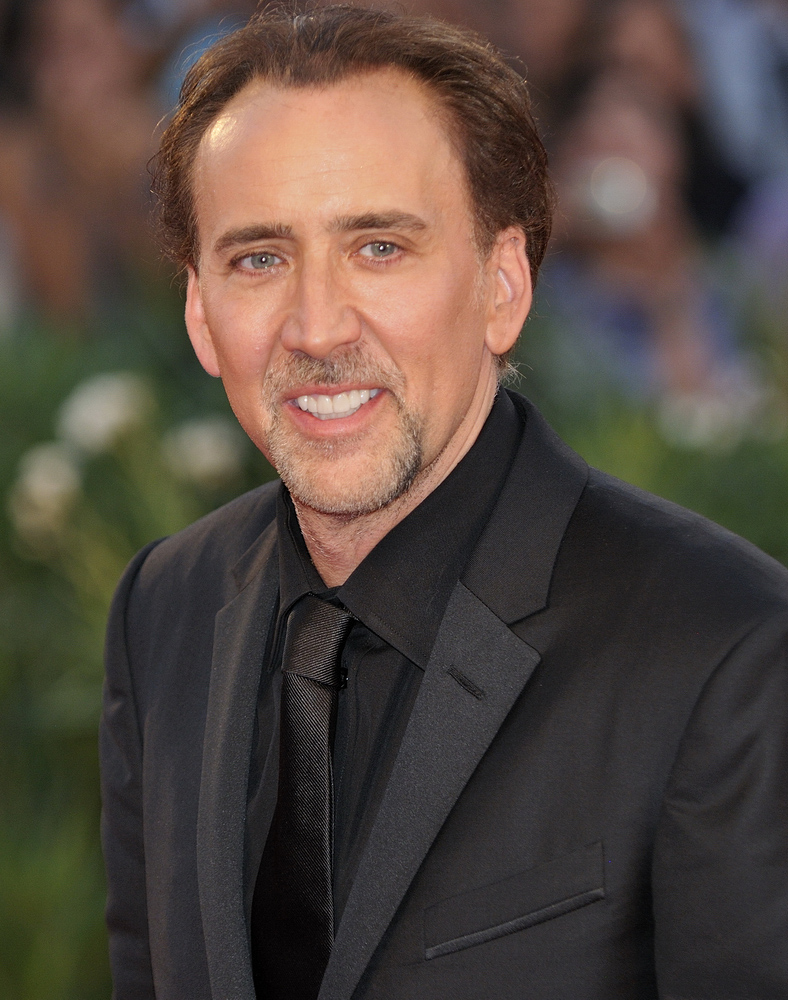
- Nicolas Cage, actor and producer.
- Pronunciation: French: [nikɔla] Spanish: [nikoˈlas]
- Gender: Male
- Language: French, Spanish, Portuguese

Origin
- Language: Greek

Other names
- See also: Nicholas

Nicolas or Nicolás may refer to masculine given names cognate to English Nicholas. The given name Nicolas is widely used in Brazil (Portuguese pronunciation: [niˈkɔlas]) and France (French pronunciation: [nikɔla]). The variant Nicolás (Spanish pronunciation: [nikoˈlas]) is widely used in Spanish-speaking countries. The variant Niccolò (Italian pronunciation: [nikkoˈlɔ]), is a popular male name in Italy, although Nicolas is also sometimes used, especially amongst Italian Americans and Latin Americans of Italian descent.

== People ==
=== Nicolas ===
- Prince Nicolas of Belgium (born 2005), grandson of King Albert II
- Prince Nicolas, Duke of Ångermanland (born 2015), grandson of King Carl XVI Gustaf
- Nicolas-Alexandre, marquis de Ségur (1695–1755), French aristocrat
- Nicolas Alvarado (born 1944), Panamanian basketball player
- Nicolas Anelka (born 1979), French footballer
- Nicolas Kenn De Balinthazy, better known as Sneako (born 1998), American internet personality
- Nicolas Cage (born 1964), American actor
- Nicolas Chalvin (born 1969), French conductor and oboist
- Nicolas Charles Oudinot (1767–1847), Maréchal d'Empire
- Nicolas Chumachenco (1944–2020), Polish violinist
- Nicolas Coutelot (born 1977), French tennis player
- Nicolas Devilder (born 1980), French tennis player
- Nicolas Dumont, several people
- Nicolas Flamel (c. 1330–1418), French alchemist
- Nicolas Girard (archer) (born 2000), French archer
- Nicolas Hayek (1928–2010), Lebanese-American Swiss businessman and founder of Swatch
- Nicolas Heurtaut (1720–1771), French wood carver and furniture designer
- Nicolas "Nico" Hülkenberg (born 1987), German racing driver
- Nicolas Huss (born 1964), French businessman
- Nicolas Jackson (born 2001), Senegalese footballer
- Nicolas de Jong (born 1988), Dutch basketball player
- Nicolas Jover (born 1981), French football coach
- Nicolas Kiefer (born 1977), German former tennis player
- Nicolas Madsen (born 2000), Danish footballer
- Nicolas Mahut (born 1982), French tennis player
- Nicolas Maupas (born 1999), Italian-French actor
- Nicolas Meizonnet (born 1983), French politician
- Nicolas Nkoulou (born 1990), Cameroonian footballer
- Nicolas Nuvan, Colombian-born American social media influencer
- Nicolas Petrou (born 1967), Cypriot-American fashion designer and couturier
- Nicolas Poussin, French Baroque painter
- Nicolas Roeg (1928–2018), English film director
- Nicolas Rothwell, Australian journalist and author
- Nicolas Sarkozy (born 1955), French politician and former president of France
- Nicolas Suzor (fl. 2010s–2020s), Australian legal scholar
- Nicolas Thierry (born 1975), French politician
- Nicolas Trifon (1949–2023), Romanian-born academic, editor and linguist in France
- Nicolas "Cole" Turner (born 2000), American football player
- Nicolas “Nic” Vansteenberghe (born 2001), American DJ, model and television personality
- Nicolas Sanchez (born 1997), Puerto Rican American Footballer and Cybersecurity Consultant, social media influencer, and boyfriend

=== Nicolás ===
(Spanish variant)

- Nicolás Aguirre (basketball) (born 1988), a professional Argentine basketball player
- Nicolás Aguirre (footballer) (born 1990), an Argentine professional association football player
- Nicolás Almagro (born 1985), a Spanish professional tennis player
- Nicolás Falczuk (born 1986), an Argentine professional association football player
- Nicolás Avellaneda (1837–1885), an Argentine journalist, professor, and President
- Nicolás Zúñiga y Miranda (1865–1925), a Mexican presidential candidate and eccentric
- Nicolás Guillén (1902–1989), a Cuban poet, journalist, political activist, and writer
- Nicolás Guillén Landrián (1938–2003), a Cuban experimental filmmaker and painter
- Nicolás Jarry (born 1994), Chilean tennis player
- Nicolás Lapentti (born 1976), an Ecuadorian professional tennis player
- Nicolás Maduro (born 1962), a Venezuelan politician, kidnapped president of Venezuela
- Nicolás Marcipar (born 2008), Argentine professional footballer
- Nicolás Massú (born 1979), a Chilean Olympic champion tennis player
- Nicolás Palacios (1854–1931), a Chilean physician, writer and political activist
- Nicolás Pauls (born 1973), an Argentine actor
- Nicolás Pereira (born 1970), a retired Venezuelan tennis player
- Nicolás Tauber (born 1980), an Argentine-Israeli professional association football player
- Nicolás Terol (born 1988), a professional Spanish motorcycle road race
- Nicolás Valansi (born 1979), Argentine-Israeli footballer

== See also ==
- Nicolas (disambiguation)#Surname
- Nicola (name)
- Nicolae (name)
- Nicolai (given name)
- Nicolaj
- Nicolao
- Nicolau
- Nicolay
