= Nicolas Heurtaut =

- Born: 1720; Paris, France
- Died: 1771 (aged 50–51)
- Occupation: Furniture designer
- Spouse: Marie-Geneviève Destrumel
- Parent(s): Claude Heurtaut; Marie-Charlotte Lhorloger

Nicolas Heurtaut (1720 – 1771) was a French wood carver and furniture designer. He designed many pieces of furniture for the French royal family and the bourgeoisie. His furniture can be found in museums in Europe and the United States.

== Early life ==
Nicolas Heurtaut was born 1720 in Paris, France. He grew up on the Neuve-de-Cléry in the 2nd arrondissement. HIs father, Claude, was an armchair designer. He had a brother, Jacques. His paternal grandfather, Simon Heurtaut, was a Parisian bourgeois.

He was an apprentice in his father's practice from the age of 13 to 18. He completed his training from 18 to 22, when he became a full-fledge furniture designer. He was elected as a member of the Académie de Saint-Luc on October 17, 1742.

== Career ==
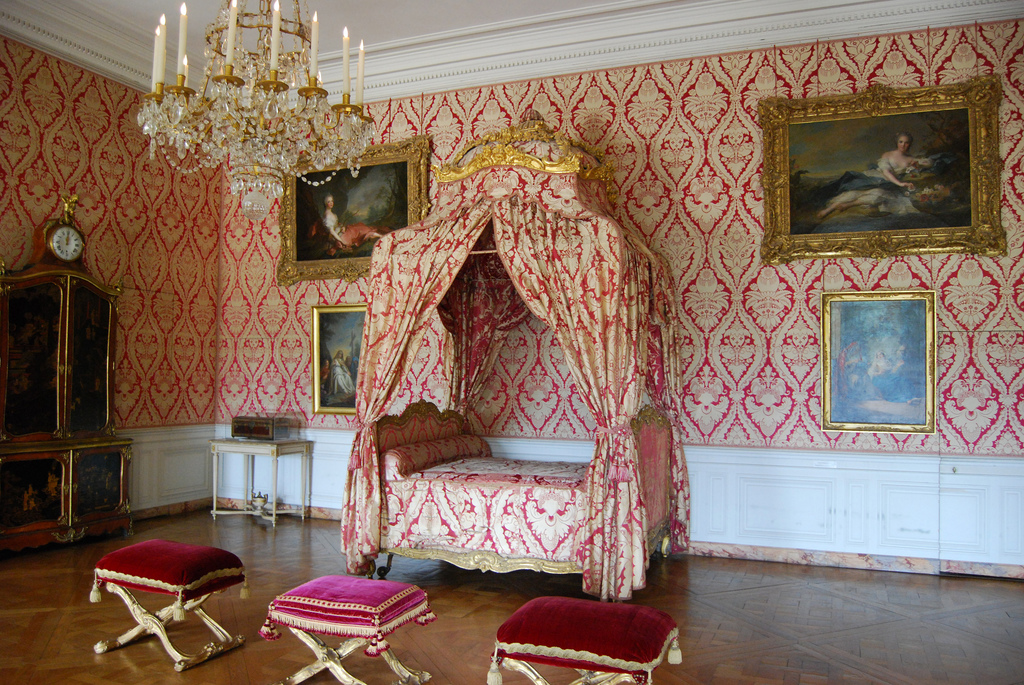
Bed designed by Heurtaut in Chateau de Versailles.

Heurtaut worked as a furniture designer from his practice on the Neuve de Cléry from 1742 to 1753. He was able to take on apprentices.

He received his inheritance in 1753, and became a senior furniture designer. He designed a sofa circa 1753, which is now displayed at the Musée des Arts Décoratifs. He also designed four armchairs for Martial-Louis Beaupoil de Sainte-Aulaire, bishop of Poitiers in 1755; they are now at the Louvre. Circa 1755, he designed an armchair, which is now at the Cleveland Museum of Art in Cleveland, Ohio, USA That same year, he designed another armchair, which is now at the J. Paul Getty Museum in Los Angeles, California. Again in 1755, he designed a gilt-wood firescreen for the owners of the Château de Montmort; it was auctioned by Sotheby's for 147,000 euros on May 5, 2015. Another armchair, owned by J. P. Morgan, was donated to the Metropolitan Museum of Art in New York City in 1906. Moreover, he designed furniture for the French royal family in the Château de Versailles.

Heurtaut designed three armchairs, two sofas and a bed for King Louis XV, who gave them to his mistress, the Countess de Séran. After she moved from Paris to Normandy, they were moved to her Château de la Tour. In 2014, two armchairs were auctioned by Christie's, and in 2016 by Sothby's. (Note: History and date of set, part of same set, including image)

From 1760 to 1765, he designed four armchairs and three sofas for François de Bussy. They were acquired by Maurice de Rothschild. They are now at the Frick Collection in New York City.

== Personal life ==
He married Marie-Geneviève Destrumel, the daughter of Guillaume-Antoine Destrumel, a furniture designer, on July 22, 1772. She sold fish on the market near the rue de Bourbon in the 2nd arrondissement.

== Death ==
He died on May 21, 1771. He was fifty-one years old. His funeral took place at Notre-Dame de Bonne-Nouvelle.
