= Nikolaos Andreadakis =

Greek athlete

Personal information
- National team: Greece
- Born: c. 1889 Ionia, Aidin Vilayet, Ottoman Empire (now Republic of Turkey)
- Died: c. 1920 (aged 30–31) Anatolia (now Republic of Turkey)
- Military career
- Allegiance: Kingdom of Greece
- Branch: Hellenic Army
- Conflicts: Greco-Turkish War (1919–1922) †

Sport
- Country: Greece
- Sport: Athletics
- Events: Men's high jump Men's long jump Men's triple jump

Nikolaos Andreadakis (1889–1920) was a Greek athlete. He competed in three events at the 1906 Intercalated Games. Andreadakis was killed in action during the Greco-Turkish War.
