= Nicolas (footballer, born 2000) =

Brazilian footballer

Personal information
- Full name: Nicolas Nunes Ferri
- Date of birth: 23 September 2000 (age 26)
- Position: Midfielder

Team information
- Current team: Novo Hamburgo

Youth career
- –2020: Novo Hamburgo

Senior career*
Years	Team	Apps	(Gls)
2020–	Novo Hamburgo	4	(0)
- * Club domestic league appearances and goals as of 16:14, 4 August 2020 (UTC)

Nicolas Nunes Ferri (born 23 September 2000), commonly known as Nicolas, is a Brazilian footballer who currently plays as a midfielder for Novo Hamburgo.

== Career statistics ==
=== Club ===
As of 4 August 2020.

Club	Season	League			State League		Cup		Continental		Other		Total	
Club	Season	Division	Apps	Goals	Apps	Goals	Apps	Goals	Apps	Goals	Apps	Goals	Apps	Goals
Novo Hamburgo	2020	–			4 (Note: Appearances in the Campeonato Gaúcho)	0	0	0	0	0	0	0	4	0
Career total			0	0	4	0	0	0	0	0	0	0	4	0
