= Zurich Opera Ball =

Swiss annual ball

The Zürich Opera Ball is a Swiss society event, fundraiser, and debutante ball held annually at the Zürich Opera House. The ball serves as a fundraiser for the Zürich Opera and Ballett Zürich.

== Description ==
The Zürich Opera Ball, held annually in March, was created as a fundraiser for the Zürich Opera and Ballett Zürich and is held in the Zürich Opera House. The ball is opened with the presentation of debutantes. Jewels for the debutantes are provided by the jewelry house Gübelin. The debutante presentation is followed by musical and ballet performances, a formal dinner, and a ball. A society event, the ball is a part of Zürich's social season and is attended by celebrities, members of the Swiss nobility, and other prominent people.

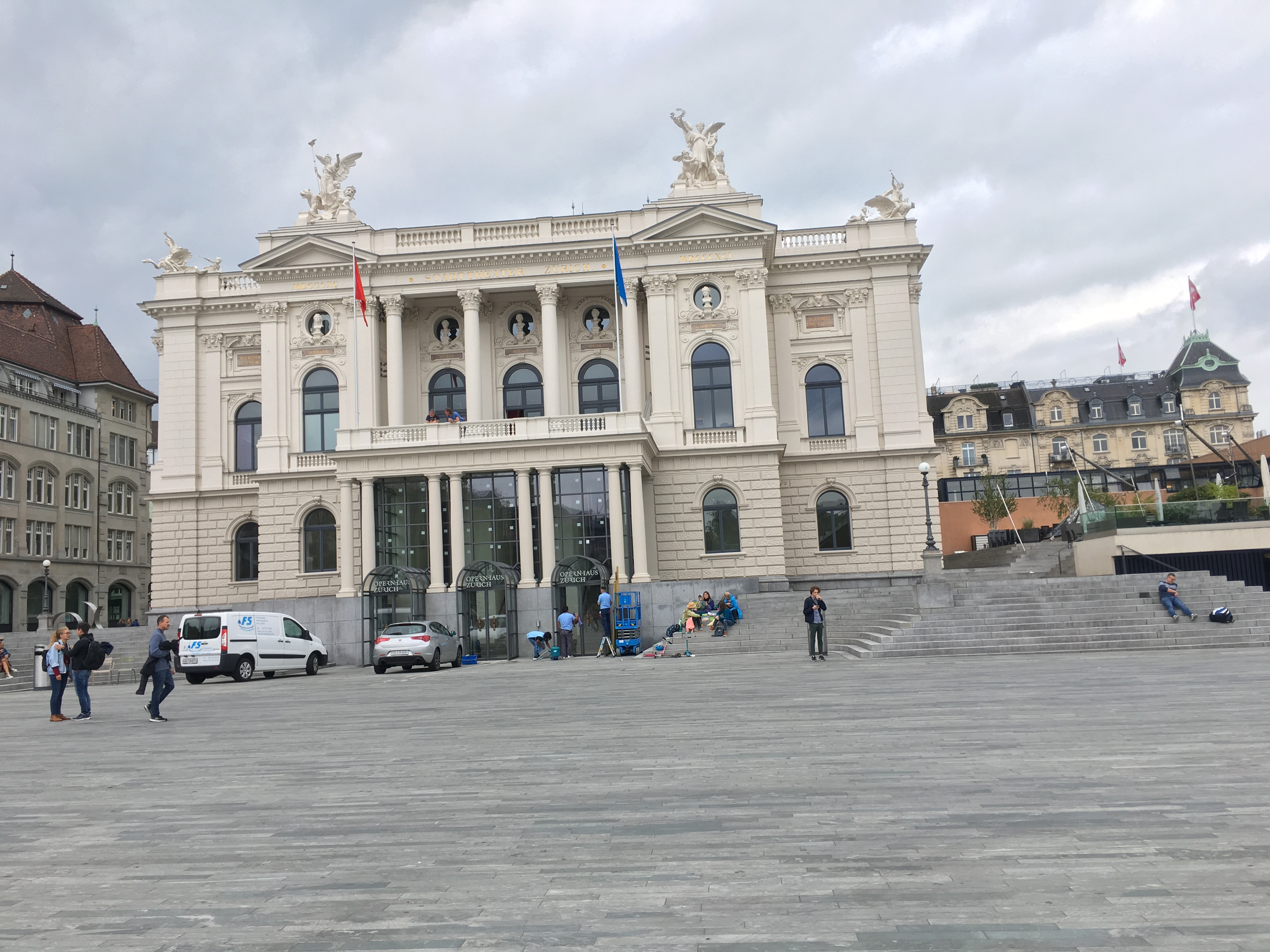
The Zürich Opera House, where the ball is held

In 2020 the ball was cancelled due to the COVID-19 pandemic in Switzerland.
