= Nicoleta Onel =

Romanian gymnast

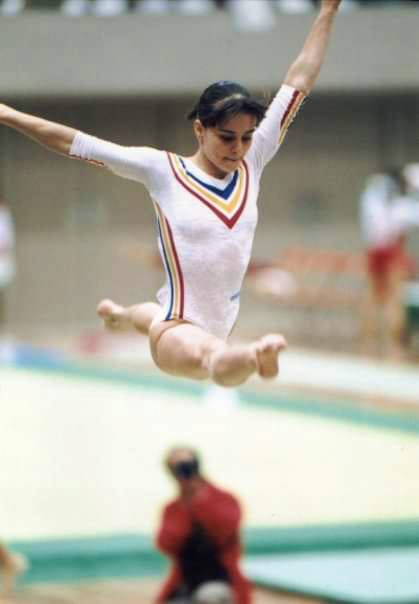

Personal information
- Full name: Nicoleta Raluca Onel
- Born: 8 March 1982 (age 44)

Gymnastics career
- Discipline: Women's artistic gymnastics
- Country represented: Romania

Nicoleta Raluca Onel (born 8 March 1982) is a former Romanian artistic gymnast. She drew notice at national and international competitions in the mid-1990s, but was forced to retire early after a spinal injury.

Onel's gymnastics achievements included second-place finishes in the all-around at the 1995 European Junior Championships and the 1997 World Junior Championships.

== Biography ==
Nicoleta Onel (wearing the National Team leotard)

Onel was born in Ploieşti, Romania, and started gymnastics at the age of 6. Her first major international success came in 1995, when she placed second in the all-around at the European Junior Championships in Belgium. The following year, she was selected to train with the senior national team in Deva. At the 1997 World Junior Championships, Onel won silver medals with the Romanian team and in the individual all-around.

Nicoleta Onel (being awarded the silver medal in Japan, 1997)

In 1998, Onel suffered a spinal injury and was advised to quit competitive gymnastics. She was hired as a gymnastics instructor at a local club in the Romanian capital, Bucharest. In 2001, she was offered a coaching position in the United Arab Emirates, at the International School of Choueifat in Al Ain.

== Competitions and results ==
National competitions

1991
- Team: 1st place
- Uneven bars: 2nd place

1992
- Uneven bars: 1st place
- All-round: 2nd place

1993
- Uneven bars: 1st place
- All-round: 2nd place
- Team: 2nd place

1994
- Uneven bars: 1st place
- All-round: 1st place
- Floor: 2nd place
- Horse vault: 3rd place

1995
- Beam: 1st place
- Uneven bars: 2nd place
- Floor: 2nd place
- Horse vault: 2nd place

Regional competitions

1995 (Hungary)
- Team: 1st place
- Uneven bars: 2nd place

1996 (Bulgaria)
- Team: 1st place

International competitions

1995 (England)
- Team: 1st place
- All-round: 4th place

1995 (Romania)
- Team: 1st place
- All-round: 3rd place

1995 (Guatemala)
- Team: 1st place
- Beam: 1st place
- All-round: 2nd place
- Uneven bars: 2nd place
- Floor: 2nd place

1995 (Netherlands)
- All-round: 5th place

1996 (Germany)
- Team: 1st place

1997 (U.S.A)
- Team: 3rd place

1997 (Spain)
- Team: 1st place

1998 (U.S.A)
- Team: 2nd place

European junior championships

1995 (Belgium)
- Team: 2nd place
- Uneven bars: 2nd place

1996 (England)
- Team: 3rd place

World junior championships

1997 (Japan)
- Beam: 2nd place
- Uneven bars: 2nd place
- Floor: 2nd place
- All-round: 2nd place

European youth Olympics

1997 (Portugal)
- All-round: 2nd place
