= 12 Inches of Sin =

Erotic Art Exhibition

- Frequency: Annually
- Locations: Las Vegas, Nevada, U.S.
- Years active: 16
- Inaugurated: 2010
- Participants: 36 artists annually
- Website: www.12ofsin.com

12 Inches of Sin is an annual art exhibition based in Las Vegas, which since its inception in 2010, has focused on exploring facets of human identity, sexuality, gender, and artistic expression. The exhibition accepts a wide range of art forms such as paintings, photographs, digital art, sculpture, illustration, mixed media and short films, all adhering to a specific rule that each piece not exceed 12 inches in any dimension. Out of all submissions, 36 artists are selected by a panel of 12 judges. To date, artists from 26 countries have participated in this exhibition.

== History ==
The inception of 12 Inches of Sin can be traced back to 2010 when Laura Henkel, a sexologist and gallerist, founded it at her Sin City Gallery. It started with 40 submissions from five countries in its first year, which increased to 300 submissions from 26 countries by its seventh year. As the number of art submissions surged, exhibition categories were introduced to accommodate traditional and new media artists, curated by Henkel.

The exhibition was envisioned as a platform for fostering learning about sex education through visual arts, aiming to challenge preconceived notions of sexuality and provide a nuanced, inclusive perspective on human identity, sexuality, gender, and expression.

The event attracts artists worldwide to the Las Vegas Arts District. In 2016, the event incorporated Immersive, a multi-media art event that showcased international performance artists known for their boundary-pushing work. Alongside this, the event featured activities such as shibari demonstrations. Sin City Gallery was included in the Best 25 Art Galleries in America list by the American Art Awards and received the Best Gallery in Nevada award. The exhibition is only open to visitors over the age of 21.

== The Juried Exhibition ==
The requirement for all submitted works is to strictly adhere to the size constraint of not being more than 12 inches in any direction, and to thematically delve into aspects of eroticism and sensuality. The artworks, which come from both emerging and established artists globally, are selected on the basis of their "sophistication, intelligence, wit, and provocation". The exhibition comprises three categories:

- 12 Inches of Sin: This category includes traditional forms of art like painting, collage, sculpture, drawings and mixed media. A panel of twelve judges selects 12 artists for exhibition and also names the Best in Show awardee, whose work is featured in an exclusive exhibition curated by Sin City Gallery.
- Obscura: This category encompasses photography, digital art, video, and all new technologies. Similar to the first category, 12 artists are chosen to exhibit, and a Best in Show awardee is selected, who is then featured in an exclusive exhibition curated by Sin City Gallery.
- Le Salon des Refusés du Péché: This category provides a curated selection of commendable works from all the art submissions and includes all mediums. It also features exhibits of artists invited from 12 Inches of Sin and Obscura.

The call for submissions happens annually from July through August. The event continues to grow and a portion of the proceeds from the exhibition are donated to the Sin Sity Sisters of Perpetual Indulgence, a charitable organization.

== Winners ==
The following are the Best in Show winners to date:

Year	Work	Artist	Country	Category
I	Mountain Climber	Allan Teger	United States	12 Inches of Sin
II	Oceana	Jeff Wack	United States	12 Inches of Sin
III	Double Cross	JP Rakehorn	United Kingdom	12 Inches of Sin
IV	Box Grid	Raymond Elstad	United States	12 Inches of Sin
V	Spoiled Ram	Kei Kusuma	Indonesia	12 Inches of Sin
V	Bus Stop	think tank ART	Germany	Obscura
VI	Liquor	Paul Butvila	Canada	12 Inches of Sin
VI	Serve You	Dennis Keim	United States	Obscura
VII	The Couple	Eric Wallis	United States	12 Inches of Sin
VII	Corset N Hook	Milan Von Brünn	United States	Obscura
