= Nicoletta =

Nicoletta is a name and feminine given name derived from the Greek Nikolaos, most often used in Italy, Sweden, Denmark and Norway. Nicoletta is also a surname. Notable people with the name include:

== Given name ==
- Nicoletta (singer) (born 1944), full name Nicoletta Grisoni, French singer, known for the recording "Mamy Blue"
- Nicoletta Batini (born 1970), Italian economist
- Nicoletta Braschi (born 1960), Italian actress and film producer
- Nicoletta Caselin
- Nicoletta Ceccoli
- Nicoletta Costa
- Nicoletta Elmi
- Nicoletta Luciani
- Nicoletta Machiavelli
- Nicoletta Manni
- Nicoletta Mantovani, second wife of the singer Luciano Pavarotti
- Nicoletta Manzione
- Nicoletta Maraschio
- Nicoletta Massone
- Nicoletta Momigliano
- Nicoletta Orsomando
- Nicoletta Panni
- Nicoletta Pasquale
- Nicoletta Rizzi
- Nicoletta Romanoff
- Nicoletta Rosellini, Italian singer
- Nicoletta Sacchi
- Nicoletta Strambelli (born 1948), Italian singer known as Patty Pravo
- Nicoletta Tinti
- Nicoletta Tozzi
- Nicoletta Vallorani, Italian science fiction writer

== Surname ==
- Daniel Nicoletta (born 1954), Italian-American photographer, photojournalist and gay rights activist
- John Nicoletta (1981–2008), American extreme skier

== See also ==
- Nicholas (name)
- Nicoleta
- Nikoletta
