= Nicole Juteau =

Canadian police officer

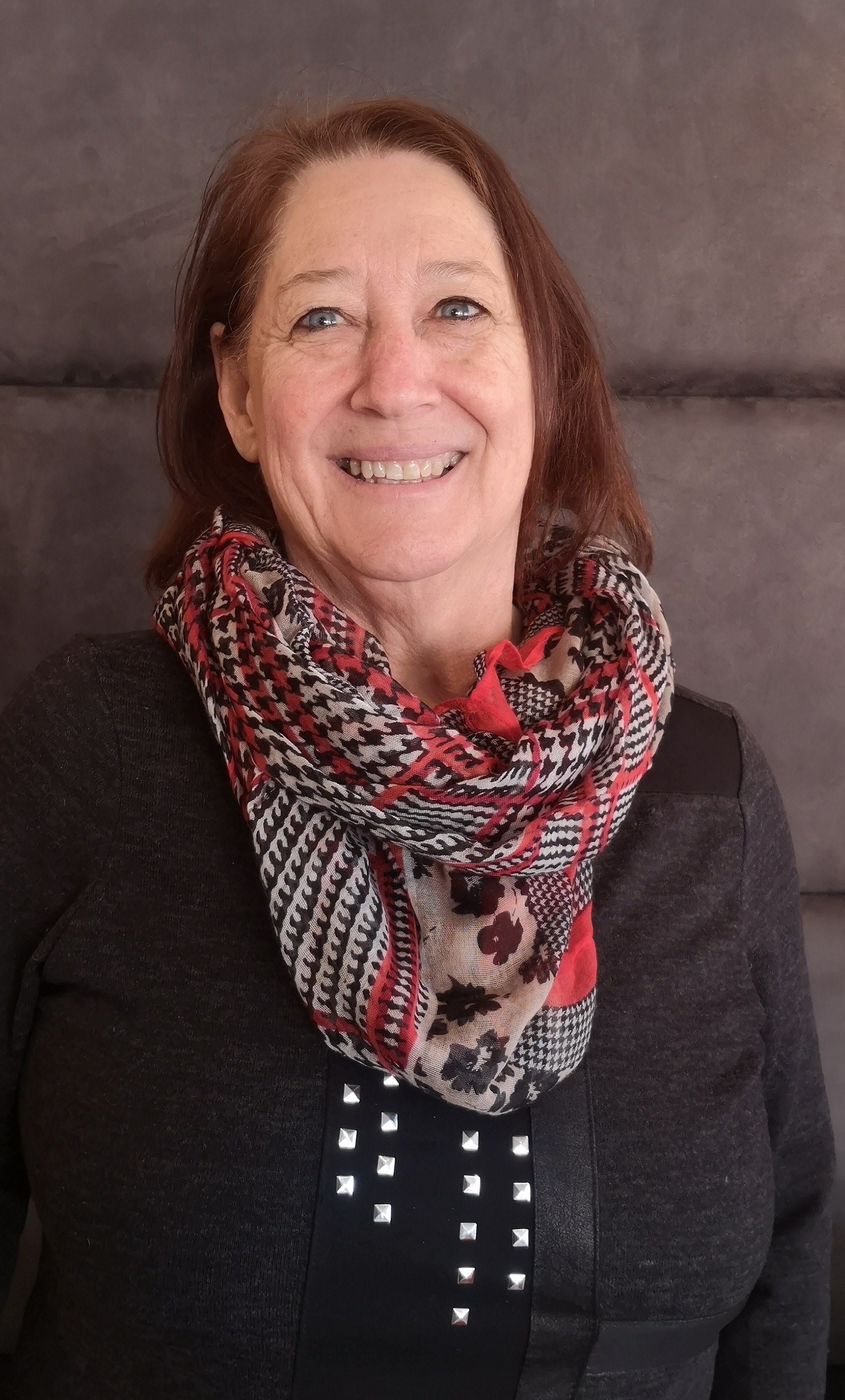
- Juteau in 2023
- Born: September 22, 1954 (age 71); Laval, Quebec
- Occupation: Police officer

Nicole Juteau (born September 22, 1954) is a retired Canadian law enforcement agent who, in 1975, became Quebec's first female police officer. She served with the Sûreté du Québec (SQ), Quebec's provincial police force, from 1975 to 2001.

== Background and education ==
Juteau was born on September 22, 1954, in Laval, Quebec. Her father was a firefighter. In later interviews, she described how she had dreamed of becoming a police officer from a young age. Her childhood home was located near a busy intersection where traffic accidents were common and she would often rush to accident scenes to watch the first responders in action.

Historically, women had served in Quebec police forces as far back as the early 1920s; however, they were generally limited to administrative roles. In 1925, the Sûreté du Québec (SQ) – then called the Police provinciale du Québec – began hiring so-called femmes de peine ("labour women") who were responsible for guarding, searching, and escorting prisoners. These women were not allowed to carry firearms and they did not have the power to arrest suspected felons.

When Juteau started at CEGEP in September 1972, she was unable to apply to the police technology program at Collège Ahuntsic, as the program did not admit women at the time. Instead, she enrolled in the school's correctional technology program, as both programs offered the same courses during the first year. She then switched to the police technology program through a counsellor who was unfamiliar with the college's policies. The manoeuvre was quickly discovered but, rather than discharge her from the program, the administration demanded she sign a pledge not to sue the college if she was unable to find a job.

In the fall of 1973, Juteau and two other women – Diane Lafontaine and Marie-Claire Gagnon – were accepted into the Institut de police du Québec in Nicolet. The two other women would later go on to work as security guards. Juteau would later describe her experience at the institute as "hell", noting that the instructors showed little interest in her. Nevertheless, she excelled in the program; she was already well-trained in karate and, through regular family hunting excursions since the age of 10, she was already proficient with a variety of firearms. When it came to the physical tests, she placed third in a class of 49.

== Career ==
Juteau approached recruiters from a number of police forces. Only two, however, were open to hiring women; the City of Sainte-Foy – now part of Quebec City – and the SQ. She applied to both and was ultimately hired by the SQ on June 17, 1975.

For the first four months of her career, Juteau was consigned to administrative duties, as regulations at the time prohibited women from serving as police officers. Furthermore, she did not meet the height and weight requirements that had been set with men in mind. The minimum height and weight requirements were 5 feet 8 inches (1.73 m) and 140 pounds (64 kg), respectively. At 5 feet 4 inches "and a half" (1.64 m) and 100 pounds (45 kg), she fell short of both thresholds. In addition to regulatory barriers, there were logistical hurdles such as a lack of uniforms designed for women so she worked for three months without one. She also faced resistance from male colleagues and a sense of pressure to excel in order to justify the presence of women in a profession that had, until then, been reserved exclusively for men.

On August 21, 1975, the National Assembly of Quebec repealed the regulations barring women from serving in the SQ. On September 11, 1975, Juteau was formally sworn in, becoming the first female police officer in the SQ's 105-year history. She was given the same duties and powers as her male counterparts. Incidentally, 1975 had been designated as International Women's Year by the United Nations.

=== Early years ===
Juteau was initially assigned to Shawinigan as a patroller. She usually operated alone, as most of her colleagues refused to work with her. In the beginning, only one officer agreed to go on patrol with her; however, he was 6 feet 2 inches (1.88 m) and, given that SQ's vehicles had a single bench for the driver and passenger, he insisted on driving, as he could not fit in the passenger seat while Juteau was at the wheel.

Other officers were less accommodating and many of her colleagues referred to her as "la femme police" ("the policewoman"), rather than by her name. She was seldom invited to after-work functions and she elicited suspicion from many of the male officers' wives. Some officers would accuse of her stealing their jobs and she would often return to find her colleagues searching her purse to see if she was taking birth control pills.

Nevertheless, Juteau's presence was generally well-received by the public. When she was assigned to direct traffic at the Festival Western de Saint-Tite, a number of drivers stopped their vehicles and approached her in order to shake her hand, sometimes blocking the traffic she had been tasked with clearing.

Juteau did, however, experience some hostility. In an interview, she recalled an incident where she and her colleagues were confronted by a group of bikers associated with the Hells Angels. One of them asked her if the sentence for raping a policewoman was the same as for another women. She replied, "Non, la sentence, c’est ça" ("No, this is the sentence") and drew her sidearm.

=== Undercover agent ===
After six years on patrol, Juteau became an undercover agent for the SQ's morality squad. At the time, cocaine was appearing on the streets of the province. Juteau would often try to entrap drug dealers in bars by posing as a stripper or a prostitute. Toward the end of her career, she worked as an intelligence officer during the Quebec Biker War in the late 1990s. She infiltrated the Hells Angels and would photograph them at major events. She earned the nickname, "La matante".

=== Later years ===
In January 2001, Juteau retired from the SQ at the age of 46. She found work as a tour guide, but continued to do contract work as an investigator. Notably, she was hired by the Quebec College of Physicians to expose unlicensed medical practitioners.

== Legacy ==
The hiring of Juteau as Quebec's first police officer cleared the way for other women to pursue careers in law enforcement. Montreal's police department hired its first female police officer in 1979 and Quebec City's police service hired two women the following year. By the time Juteau left the SQ in 2001, there were more than 1,900 women serving as police officers throughout Quebec.

In 2020, Juteau's admission to the SQ on June 17, 1975, was designated an historic event by Nathalie Roy, Quebec's Minister of Culture and Communications.
