= Molecular Genetics and Metabolism =

- Discipline: Genetics, Biochemistry
- Language: English
- Edited by: E.R.B. McCabe

Publication details
- Publisher: Academic Press on behalf of the Society for Inherited Metabolic Disorders

Standard abbreviations
- ISO 4: Mol. Genet. Metab.

Indexing
- ISSN: 1096-7192 (print); 1096-7206 (web)
- OCLC no.: 37861484

Links
- Journal homepage

Molecular Genetics and Metabolism is a peer-reviewed academic journal published by Academic Press. It is the official journal of the Society for Inherited Metabolic Disorders.

The editor is E.R.B. McCabe.

== Abstracting and indexing ==
The journal is abstracted/indexed in:

- EMBASE
- EMBiology
- Scopus
