= Nicole Alexandropoulou =

Greek-Italian director, producer, screenplay writer and photographer

Nicole Alexandropoulou (Greek:Νικόλ Αλεξανδροπούλου) also known as Nicole Alexandropoulos is a Greek-Italian director, producer, screenplay writer, and photographer.

== Life and career ==
Alexandropoulou was born in Thessaloniki, Greece and raised in Rome, Italy. She studied Art History and Photography at the Istituto Europeo di Design. She also studied at Duse International Drama School and attended creative writing seminars.

She launched her career as a photographer in 1992 and she collaborated for a decade with Photomovie and Sigma Corporation of America agencies, various Italian magazines, Mondadori and Rizzoli publishing groups making portraits of celebrities and politicians like Rudolph Nureyev, Mikis Theodorakis, Harrison Ford, Romano Prodi, Silvio Berlusconi, Marco Bellocchio etc.

Alexandropoulou began her involvement in film industry as a director's personal assistant for Bellocchio and Paolo Virzi. In 1993 she worked on Marco Bellocchio's film Il sogno della farfalla while the following year she worked on the production of the Italian drama film With Closed Eyes (written and directed by Francesca Archibugi). In 2000 she wrote and directed the short film I fantastici Boors which was distinguished in Trani and Capalbio Film Festival.

Alexandropoulou also took part in photography group exhibitions and in 2007 she made a solo exhibition in Athens Technopolis under the title Malinconia where she presented various photo portraits of men and women including Monica Bellucci, Mickey Rourke, Mstislav Rostropovich and Philip Glass.

In 2009 she wrote, produced and directed Once in a lifetime, a documentary film about the prominent Greek radio producer Yannis Petridis which made its premiere in Athens International Film Festival and displayed in various international film festivals in Rome, Brussels, Thessaloniki, Patras etc.

The same year she appeared in a small role in an episode of ANT1's TV series Ergazomeni Gynaika. During 2016-17 Alexandropoulou wrote, produced and directed the documentary TV series From A Thorn Comes A Rose (original Greek title: Από Αγκάθι Ρόδο); consisted of 30 episodes (3 seasons), aired in ERT and hosted by Yorgos Pirpassopoulos, dealt with numerous aspects of the Greek society. Moreover, Second Life (Greek: Δεύτερη Ζωή), an episode dedicated in organ donating won the Special Jury Award in 2017 London Greek Film Festival.

In 2017 Alexandropoulou was co-writer of the screenplay for the documentary film Andreas Lentakis – A Romantic Fighter, dedicated to the Greek politician and distinguished member of the Anti-Junta movement, Andreas Lentakis which was also awarded in 2017 London Greek Film Festival with Best Creative Documentary award. The last years she is working on a biographical film about deceased Greek fashion designer Billy Bo.

Alexandropoulou is former member of the board of directors of the Greek Documentary Association and a columnist. She is the founder and director of Athens Fashion Film Festival.

== Filmography ==
=== Director ===
- I fantastici Boors (2000, short fiction film)
- Once in a Lifetime (2009, documentary film)
- From A Thorn Comes A Rose (2016-17, documentary TV series, 30 episodes ERT SA)
- Second life (2016, documentary film)
- Kick-off (2017, documentary film)
- Sin Yinexi (2020-21, documentary TV series, 28 episodes ERT SA)
- Walking in one heel (2020-21, documentary film)
- BILLY (pre-production)
- Christianity and Science (documentary feature series, 4 episodes) (pre-production)

=== Screenwriter ===
- Once in a Lifetime (2009, documentary film)
- From A Thorn Comes A Rose (2016-17, documentary TV series, 30 episodes)
- Second life (2016, documentary film)
- Kick-off (2017, documentary film)
- Sin Yinexi (2020-21, documentary TV series, 28 episodes ERT SA)
- Walking in one heel (2020-21, documentary film)
- Andreas Lentakis - A Romantic Fighter (2017, documentary film)
- BILLY (fiction feature film) (pre-production)
- Christianity and Science (documentary feature series, 4 episodes) (pre-production)

=== Producer ===
- Once in a Lifetime (2009, documentary film)
- From A Thorn Comes A Rose (2016-17, documentary TV series, 30 episodes ERT SA)
- Second life (2017, documentary film)
- Kick-off (2017, documentary film)
- Land (2019, animation short film)
- Sin Yinexi (2020-21, documentary TV series, 28 episodes ERT SA)
- Walking in one heel (2020-21, documentary film)
- BILLY (fiction feature film) (pre-production)
- Christianity and Science (documentary feature series, 4 episodes) (pre-production)

=== Actor ===
- La donna lupo (1999)
- Ergazomeni Gynaika (2009, TV series), Mrs. Giannari

== Awards ==
- Special Jury Award in 2017 London Greek Film Festival for Second Life
- Best Creative Documentary Award in 2017 London Greek Film Festival for Andreas Lentakis - A Romantic Fighter
- Best Animation Short Length Film in 2019 International Documentary Film Festival of Ierapetra for Land
