= Nicolao Colletti =

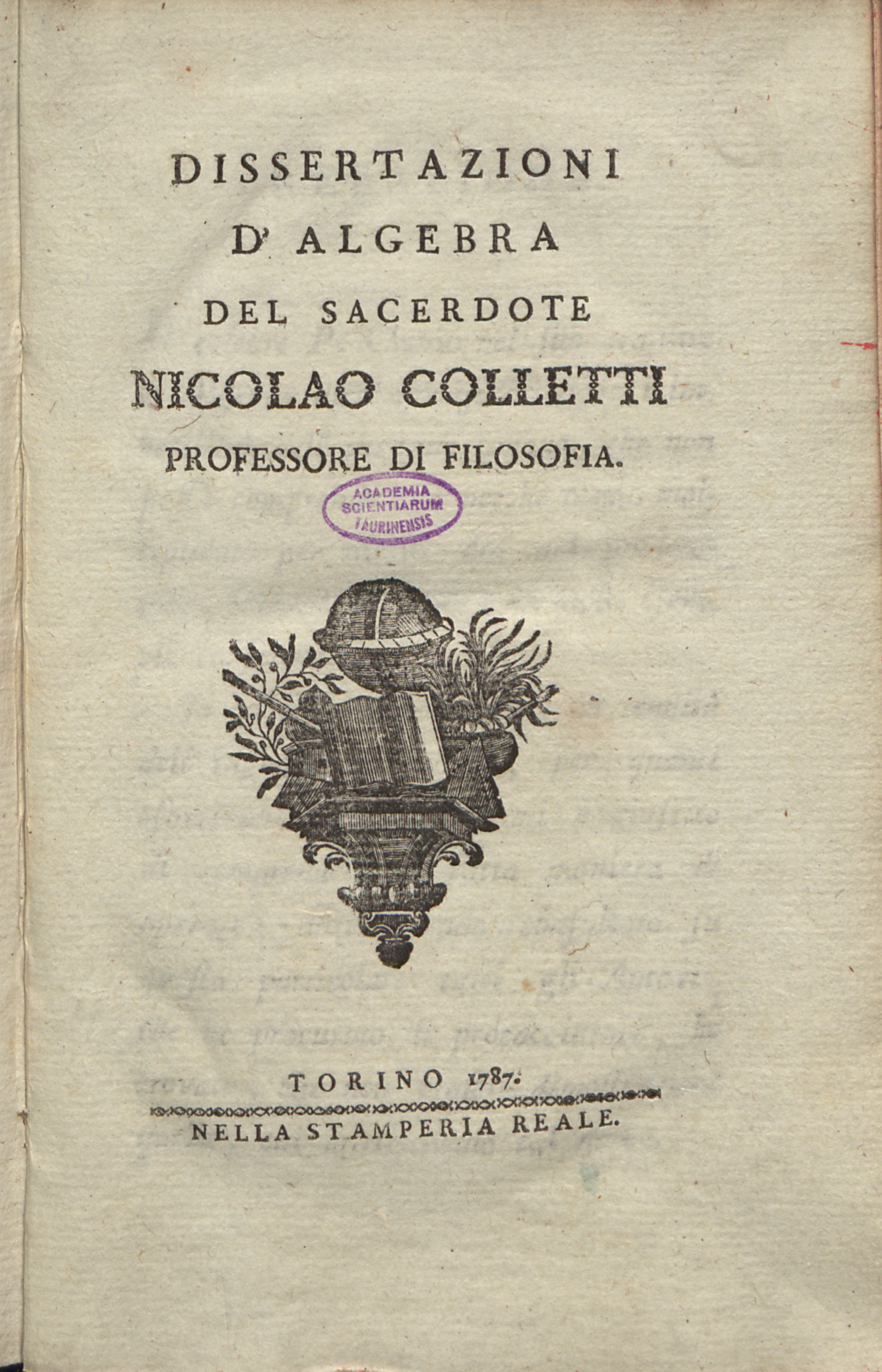
Dissertazioni d'algebra, title page (1787)

Nicolao Colletti (also written Coletti) was an 18th-century Italian mathematician and academic of the Republic of Venice.

Born in Venice, he was a Catholic priest in the church of San Moisè and a professor of philosophy.

In collaboration with his brother Sebastiano, a bookseller and publisher, he began a new edition of L'Italia Sacra in 1717, which ended in 1722 with the 10th volume.

In 1787 his book about mathematics Dissertazioni d'algebra was published in Turin.

== Works ==
- Dissertazioni d'algebra. Torino: Stamperia reale. 1787.
