= Nicolao Fornengo =

Italian physicist

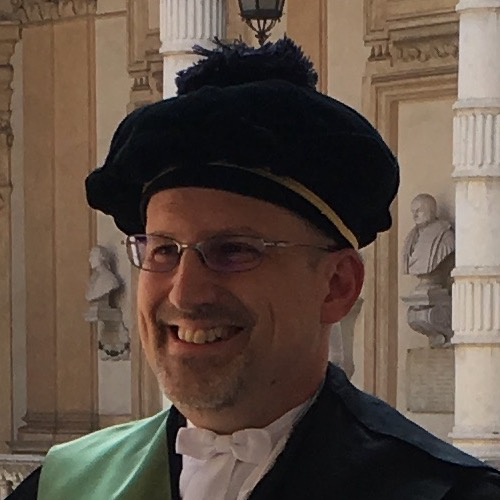
- Born: 20 November 1966 (age 59); Ivrea
- Education: University of Turin
- Scientific career
- Fields: Astroparticle physics Neutrino physics Cosmology
- Workplaces: University of Turin
- Thesis: Dark matter: neutralino relic abundance and its detection signals

Nicolao Fornengo (born 20 November 1966, Ivrea) is an Italian physicist. He is currently Full Professor at the University of Turin and he works on astroparticle physics, neutrino physics and cosmology.

== Biography ==
He graduated in Physics at the University of Turin in 1990 with a first-class honour’s degree. In the same university he got a Ph.D, working in the group of Alessandro Bottino, and in 1995 he presented his dissertation: “Dark matter: neutralino relic abundance and its detection signals”.

He worked as a postdoc at the Johns Hopkins University (USA), at the University of Valencia (Spain) and as a visiting scientist at the Korea Institute for Advanced Study (South Corea), Laboratoire de Physique Theoretique (France), Galileo Galilei Institute for Theoretical Physics (Italy) and CERN (Switzerland). He got a position as researcher (1999-2006) and then he became associate professor at the University of Turin.

He is currently a member of the scientific commission of the Gran Sasso National Laboratories, co-chair of the scientific commission of the International School on Astroparticle Physics (ISAAP) and chair of the governing board of the International conference on Topics in Astroparticle and Underground Physics (TAUP).

== Publications ==
Among the leading experts of neutralinos and light sneutrinos in supersymmetry, together with his collaborators, he proposed two new techniques to reveal dark matter: the research of antideuterium via space telescopes and the angular cross-correlation of extragalactic gravitational signals and dark matter non gravitational signals.

He has more than 100 publications on international scientific magazines and an Hirsch index of more than 50. He presented his works on more than 100 international conferences.
