= Nicolette =

Nicolette may refer to:

== People ==
=== Given name ===
- Nicolette (musician) (born 1964), a UK singer/songwriter of Nigerian parentage
- Nicolette Bethel, Bahamian teacher, writer and anthropologist
- Nicolette Boele, Australian political candidate
- Nicolette Fernandes (born 1983), Guyanese squash player
- Nicolette Fraillon (born 1960), Australian conductor
- Nicolette Hellemans (born 1961), former international rower from the Netherlands
- Nicolette Jennings (born 1996), American model, beauty pageant titleholder, Miss Florida USA 2019, and Top 10 Miss USA 2019
- Nicolette Krebitz (born 1972), German actress
- Nicolette Larson (1952–1997), American singer
- Nicolette Palikat (born 1985), Malaysian singer from Tambunan, Sabah
- Nicollette Sheridan (born 1963), British actress

=== Surname ===
- Mike Nicolette (born 1956), American professional golfer

== Other uses ==
- Nicolette (album), a 1978 album release by Nicolette Larson
- Nicolette (novel), a 1922 novel by Baroness Orczy
- Nicolette (play), an 1899 play by Edward Ferris and Arthur Stuart
- Nicolette, West Virginia, a community in the United States
- Nicolette Grant, a character on the HBO series Big Love

== See also ==
- Aucassin and Nicolette, a medieval French chantefable
- DJ-Kicks: Nicolette, a DJ mix album
- Nicollet (disambiguation)
