= Nicolay =

Nicolay is a given name and a surname. The Digital Dictionary of German Family Names says that as a German surname, it is a spelling variant of "Nikolai" and the latter is described as a patronymic from the given name Nikolaus produced with the Latin genitive suffix '-i'. Notable people with the name include:

== Given name ==
- Nicolay (musician) (born 1974), Dutch record producer
- Nicolay Aarestrup (1898–1983), Norwegian businessperson
- Nicolay August Andresen (1812–1894), Norwegian banker
- Nicolay de Caveri, 15th-16th century Genoese cartographer
- Nicolay Peter Drejer (1773–1808), Norwegian military officer
- Nicolay Natzvalov (1884–1919), Russian general
- Nicolay Nicolaysen (1817–1911), Norwegian archaeologist and antiquarian
- Nicolay Paskevich (1907–2003), American painter
- Nicolay Ramm (born 1988), Norwegian journalist and comedian
- Nicolay Solberg (born 1991), Norwegian footballer
- Nicolay Nicolaysen Sontum (1852–1915), Norwegian engineer

== Surname ==
- Christian Nicolay (born 1976), German javelin thrower
- Francis Nicolay (1944–2002), Belgian footballer
- François de Nicolay (1919–1963), French farm manager, arboriculturist and politician
- Franz Nicolay (born 1977), American musician and writer
- Janice K. Nicolay (1942–2024), American politician
- Jean Nicolay (1937–2014), Belgian footballer
- John George Nicolay (1832–1901), German-American civil servant and author
- Louis Nicolay, Belgian sports delegate in the 1950s
- Ludwig Ernst von Nicolay (1820–1891), Russian general
- Ludwig Heinrich von Nicolay (1737–1820), German poet
- Mary Nicolay (1850–1939), British Australian Nightingale nurse
- Nicolas de Nicolay (1517–1583), French geographer
- Nicolás Nicolay (born 1979), Argentine footballer
- Scott Nicolay (born 1963), American author of weird fiction
- William Nicolay (1771–1842), British Army officer and colonial governor

== See also ==
- de Nicolay family
- Nicholas
- Nicola
- Nicolae
- Nicolai
- Nicolaj
- Nicolao
- Nicolas
- Nicolau
