= Nikolaj =

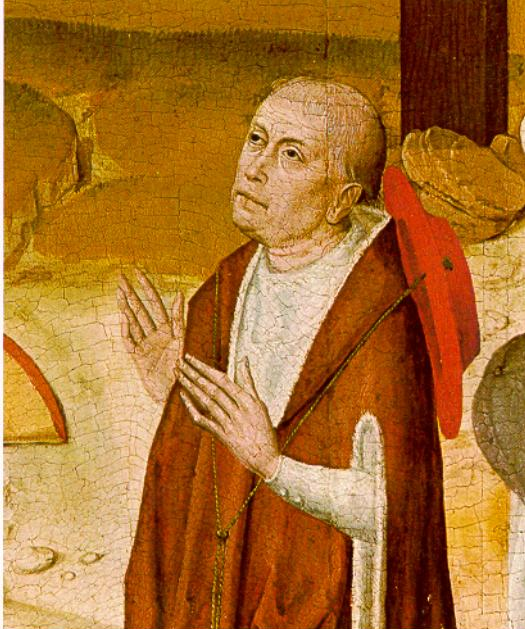
Nicholas of Cusa

Nikolaj is a Danish given name, derived from the name Nicholas. Many different ways of spelling the name have been approved in Denmark.

It may refer to:

- Nikolaj Abraham Abildgaard, Danish artist
- Nicolaj Agger, Danish professional football player
- Nikolaj Coster-Waldau, Danish actor
- Nikolaj Ehlers, Danish professional ice hockey player
- Nikolaj Frederik Severin Grundtvig, Danish teacher, writer, poet, philosopher, historian, pastor and politician
- Nikolaj Koppel, Danish musician
- Nikolaj Hansen (footballer, born 1987), Danish footballer for FC Roskilde
- Nikolaj Hansen (footballer, born 1993), Danish footballer for Víkingur
- Nikolaj Hübbe, balletmaster of the Royal Danish Ballet and former principal dancer at the New York City Ballet
- Nikolaj Nissen (1627–1684), Danish judge
- Nikolaj Nyholm, Danish serial technology entrepreneur and investor
- Nikolaj Memola, Italian figure skater
- Nikolaj Pimenov (born 1997), Serbian rower
- Nikolaj Znaider, Danish violinist
