= Nikola (disambiguation) =

Nikola (Cyrillic: Никола) is a given name.

Nikola may also refer to:

== Nikola ==
- Nikola Corporation, a U.S. vehicle company
- Nikola & Fattiglapparna ("Nikola"), a 2010 album by Nikola Sarcević
- Doctor Nikola, a novel series about an occult anti-hero
- Nikola (TV series), a German TV series
- Nikola Peak, Ellsworth Mountains, Antarctica; a mountain

== Saint Nikola ==
- Saint Nikola Tavelic (died 1391) Croatian Franciscan friar
- Church of St. Nikola, Dobrelja, Bosnia and Herzegovina
- Abbey of St. Nikola in Passau, Lower Bavaria, Germany
- Sankt Nikola an der Donau (Saint Nikola on the Donau), Perg, Upper Austria, Austria
- Sveti Nikola Island (Saint Nikola Island), Budva, Montenegro; an island in the Adriatic Sea
- Sveti Nikola (village) (Saint Nikola), a village in Kavarna Municipality, Bulgaria
- "Sveti Nikola" (song) (Saint Nikola), a 2009 song by Kerber

== Other uses ==
- Nikola, Prince of Montenegro
- Nikola I (disambiguation)
- Nikola II (disambiguation)
- Nikola III (disambiguation)
- Nikola Kovač

== See also ==
- Sveti Nikola (disambiguation)
- Nikola Tesla (disambiguation)
- Nikola I (disambiguation)
- Nikola II (disambiguation)
- Nikola III (disambiguation)
- Nicola (disambiguation)
- Nicole (disambiguation)
- Nikolai (disambiguation)
- Nicholas (disambiguation)
- Nick (disambiguation)
