= Nicole =

Nicole may refer to:

== People ==
- Nicole (name)
- Nicole (American singer) (born 1958), a contestant in season 3 of the American The X Factor
- Nicole (Chilean singer) (born 1977)
- Nicole (German singer) (born 1964), winner of the 1982 Eurovision Song Contest
- Nicole, Countess of Penthièvre (c. 1424–after 1480)
- Nicole, Duchess of Lorraine (1608–1657), French noblewoman
- Nicole LaRoche, flutist in the band Brulé, releases solo albums as "Nicole"

== Storms ==
- Tropical Storm Nicole, a number of named tropical and subtropical cyclones
  - Tropical Storm Nicole (2010)
  - Hurricane Nicole (2016)
  - Hurricane Nicole (2022)

== Other uses ==
- Nicole (album), an album by Indonesian singer NIKI
- Nicole (film), a 1978 thriller
- Nicole (restaurant), in Turkey
- Nicole (video game), a visual novel style game
- Nicole, Lot-et-Garonne, a town in France
- "Nicole", a song by Ween from the 1990 album GodWeenSatan: The Oneness

== See also ==
- Nicolle
- Nicoll Highway
- Nichole
- Nicholas (disambiguation)
- Nicola (disambiguation)
