= Nicholas II (disambiguation) =

Nicholas II was the last emperor of Russia from 1894 to 1917.

Nicholas II may also refer to:

- Pope Nicholas II (c. 990/995–1061)
- Nicholas II of Transylvania (1213), voivode
- Nicholas II of Saint Omer (r. 1258–1294)
- Patriarch Nicholas II of Alexandria (r. 1263–1276)
- Nicholas II, Duke of Opava (1268–1365)
- Nicholas II Garay (1367–1433)
- Nicholas II, Count of Tecklenburg (died 1426)
- Nicholas II Zorzi (14th–15th century)
- Nicholas II of Niemodlin (c. 1462–1497)
- Nicolaus II Bernoulli, Swiss mathematician (1695–1726)
- Nicholas II, Prince Esterházy (1765–1833)
- Crown Prince Nicholas II of Montenegro (born 1944)

== See also ==
- Nikola II (disambiguation)
- Nicholas (disambiguation)
- Nicholas I (disambiguation)
- Nicholas III (disambiguation)
