= Kolya =

Kolya may refer to:

== People ==
- Kolya, a diminutive variant of Nikolai
- Kolya the Obscure, nickname of Nikolay Davydenko (born 1981), Russian tennis player
- Kolya Korobov (born 2004), Russian singer and actor
- Kolya Lukashenko (born 2004), son of Alexander Lukashenko, Belarusian president
- Kolya Vasin (1945–2018), Russian music historian and writer, one of the main popularizers of the Beatles inside the USSR and Russia

== Arts and entertainment ==
- Kolya (film), a 1996 Czech film

=== Fictional characters ===
- Kolya Krassotkin, in Dostoevsky's novel The Brothers Karamazov
- Kólya, in Dostoevsky's novel The Idiot
- Nikolai "Kolya" Rodchenko, a protagonist of the 1985 American film White Nights, played by Mikhail Baryshnikov
- the title character of the 1996 Czech film Kolya
- the protagonist of the 2014 Russian film Leviathan
- Acastus Kolya, a character in the American television series Stargate Atlantis
- Kolya Rostov, a character in the American television series The Colbys

== Places ==
- Kolya (crater), on the Moon
- Kolya, Iran, a village
- 6619 Kolya, an asteroid

== See also ==
- Kolja (disambiguation)
