= Saint-Nicolas, Belgium =

Saint-Nicolas, Belgium may refer to the following places:

- Saint-Nicolas, East Flanders, French name for Sint-Niklaas, in the province of East Flanders
- Saint-Nicolas, Liège, in the province of Liège, Wallonia

== See also ==
- Saint Nicolas
