= Kolja =

Kolja or Colja is a short form of the given name Nikolai. It may refer to:

- Kolja (film), Czech 1996 drama film
- Kolja Afriyie (born 1982), German former professional football player
- Kolja Blacher (born 1963), German violin player
- Kolja Pusch (born 1993), German footballer
- Kolja Schallenberg (born 1984), German director and play writer
- Alojz Colja (born 1943), Slovenian rower
- Nikola Pejaković, Serbian actor, theater director and musician, nicknamed Kolja.

== See also ==
- Kolya (disambiguation)
