= Nicholas III =

Nicholas III may refer to:

- Patriarch Nicholas III of Constantinople (died 1111), ruled 1084–1111
- Pope Nicholas III (c. 1225–1280), ruled 1277–1280
- Nicholas III, Lord of Mecklenburg (after 1230–1289 or 1290)
- Nicholas III of Saint Omer (died 1314)
- Nicholas III, Duke of Opava (c. 1339–1394)
- Patriarch Nicholas III of Alexandria, ruled 1389–1398
- Prince Karl Emich of Leiningen (born 1952), pretender to the Russian throne as Nicholas III

== See also ==
- Nicholas (disambiguation)
- Niccolò III (disambiguation)
- Nikola III (disambiguation)
