= Niccolò I =

Niccolò I may refer to:

- Niccolò I d'Este, Marquis of Modena and Ferrara (died 1344), see Duke of Ferrara and of Modena
- Niccolò I Ludovisi (1634–1664)
- Niccolò I Sanudo (died in 1341)
- Niccolò I Trinci (died in 1421)

== See also ==
- Nicholas I (disambiguation)
- Niccolò (name)
