= Nicholas I =

Nicholas I may refer to:

- Pope Nicholas I (c. 800–867), or Nicholas the Great
- Nicholas Mystikos (852–925), Patriarch Nicholas I of Constantinople
- Nicholas I (bishop of the Isles) (fl. 1147–1152), Bishop-elect of the Isles
- Nicholas I, Lord of Mecklenburg (died 1200)
- Nicholas I of Transylvania (died after 1203), voivode of Transylvania
- Nicholas I (bishop of Schleswig) (died 1233)
- Patriarch Nicholas I of Alexandria, Greek Patriarch of Alexandria between 1210 and 1243
- Nicholas I, Duke of Troppau (c. 1255–1318), natural son of king Ottokar II of Bohemia, became Duke of Troppau in Silesia
- Nicholas I, Lord of Rostock (died 1314)
- Nicholas I, Count of Tecklenburg (died 1367)
- Nicholas I Garai (died 1386), chief governor of Bratislava, palatine to the King of Hungary
- Nicholas I of Opole (c. 1424–1476)
- Nicholas I, Duke of Lorraine (1448–1473)
- Nicolaus I Bernoulli (1687–1759); Swiss mathematician
- Nicholas I, Prince Esterházy (1714–1790), Hungarian prince
- Nicholas I of Russia (1796–1855), Emperor of Russia and King of Poland
- Nicholas I of Montenegro (1841–1921), King of Montenegro

== See also ==
- Niccolò I (disambiguation)
- Nicholas (disambiguation)
- Nikola I (disambiguation)
