= Hurricane Nicole (2022) =

Category 1 Atlantic hurricane

- Hurricane Nicole making landfall in eastern Florida at peak intensity on November 10

Meteorological history
- Formed: November 7, 2022
- Dissipated: November 11, 2022

Category 1 hurricane
- 1-minute sustained (SSHWS/NWS)
- Highest winds: 75 mph (120 km/h)
- Lowest pressure: 980 mbar (hPa); 28.94 inHg

Overall effects
- Fatalities: 11 indirect
- Damage: $1 billion (2022 USD)
- Areas affected: Dominican Republic, Puerto Rico, The Bahamas, Southeastern United States
- IBTrACS /
- Part of the 2022 Atlantic hurricane season

Hurricane Nicole was a sprawling late-season Category 1 hurricane in November 2022. The fourteenth named storm and eighth hurricane of the 2022 Atlantic hurricane season, Nicole formed as a subtropical cyclone on November 7, from a non-tropical area of low pressure near the Greater Antilles, and transitioned into a tropical cyclone the next day. Then, taking a path similar to that of Hurricane Dorian three years earlier, Nicole made landfall on November 9, on Great Abaco and on Grand Bahama in the Bahamas, where it strengthened into a Category 1 hurricane. On November 10, it made landfall twice in Florida, south of Vero Beach and then northwest of Cedar Key, after briefly emerging over the Gulf of Mexico. Nicole then weakened to a depression while moving over the Florida Panhandle, and then was absorbed into a mid-latitude trough and cold front over extreme eastern Tennessee the following day.

Nicole became the third November hurricane on record to make landfall in Florida, along with the 1935 Yankee hurricane and Hurricane Kate in 1985. Nicole crossed the same region in Florida devastated six weeks earlier by Hurricane Ian, and was the first hurricane to make landfall on Florida's east coast since Katrina in 2005. Despite being relatively weak, Nicole's large size produced widespread heavy rainfall and strong winds across the Greater Antilles, the Bahamas, and Florida, knocking out power and inflicting significant damage in many areas. Days of strong on-shore wind flow onto the east coast of Florida produced severe beach erosion, especially in Volusia, St. Johns, and Flagler counties. Eleven indirect deaths altogether have been connected to the storm, six in the Dominican Republic and five in Florida.

== Meteorological history ==
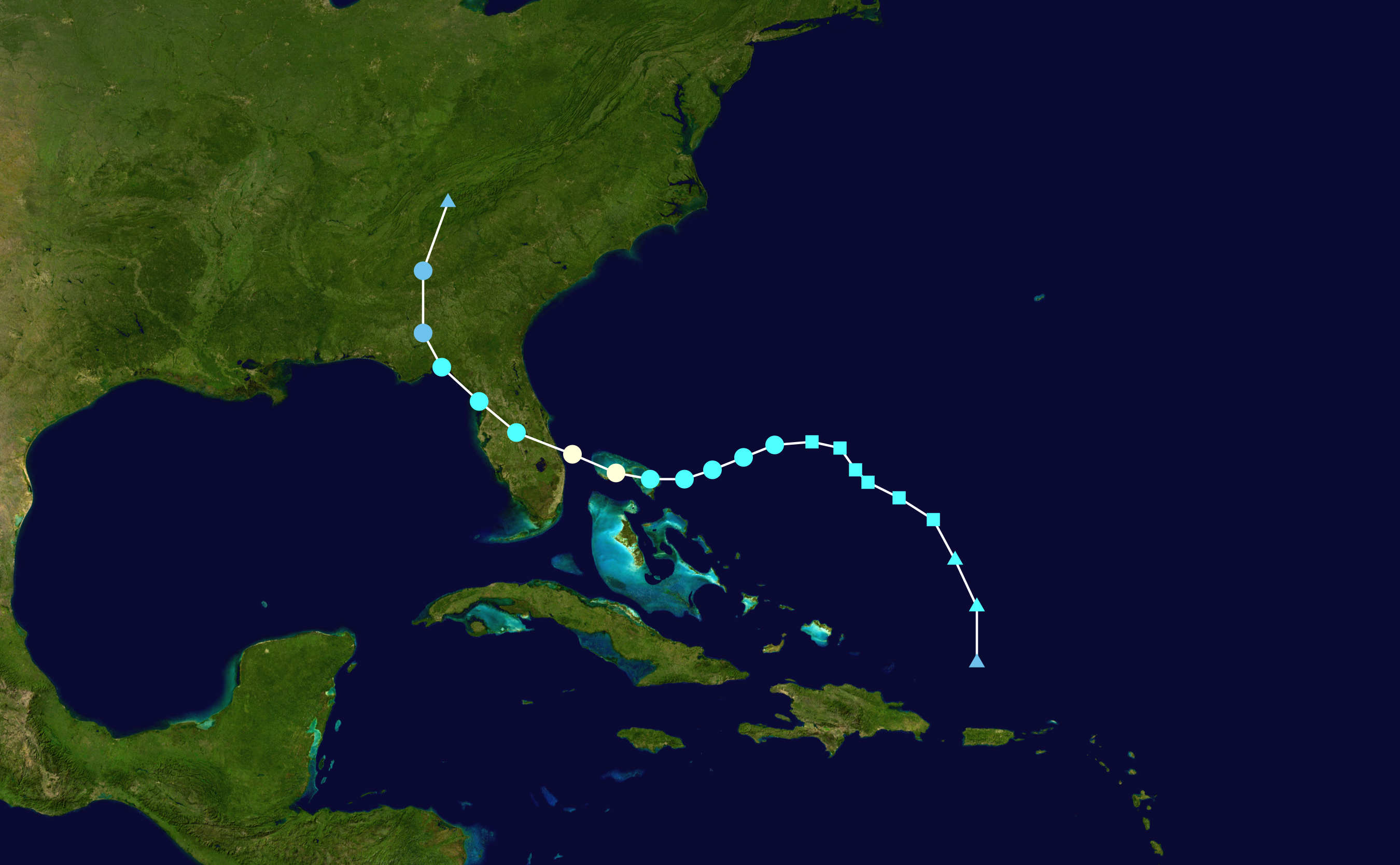
Map plotting the storm's track and intensity, according to the Saffir–Simpson scale Map key Saffir–Simpson scale Tropical depression (≤38 mph, ≤62 km/h) Tropical storm (39–73 mph, 63–118 km/h) Category 1 (74–95 mph, 119–153 km/h) Category 2 (96–110 mph, 154–177 km/h) Category 3 (111–129 mph, 178–208 km/h) Category 4 (130–156 mph, 209–251 km/h) Category 5 (≥157 mph, ≥252 km/h) Unknown Storm type Tropical cyclone Subtropical cyclone Extratropical cyclone, remnant low, tropical disturbance, or monsoon depression

A mid- to upper-level trough in the westerlies moved from the Mid-Atlantic states into the western Atlantic on November 3. As this disturbance moved southward on November 4, the National Hurricane Center (NHC) began monitoring the northeastern Caribbean Sea and southwestern Atlantic Ocean where a large non-tropical low-pressure system was expected to develop within a few days. This system then interacted with the Intertropical Convergence Zone over northern South America and on November 5, a broad area of low pressure producing disorganized showers and thunderstorms formed over the Caribbean Sea south of Hispaniola before reforming north of Puerto Rico the next day. Benefitting from the inflow of moist tropical air from the Caribbean Sea and very warm 83 °F (28 °C) sea surface temperatures, the disturbance was soon exhibiting some subtropical characteristics, and gradually becoming better organized as it moved north-northwestward closer to an upper-level low. This trend continued into the next day, with a sufficiently well-defined center of circulation developing, deep convection increasing and a band of winds with speeds reaching 45 mph (75 km/h) occurring to the east of the center. Convective organization continued to increase and at 06:00 UTC on November 7, the disturbance developed into Subtropical Storm Nicole while located about 470 nmi (870 km) south-southwest of Bermuda. After forming, Nicole moved erratically northwestward due to southeasterly flow on the west side of a low- to mid-level ridge as the low-level center became vertically stacked with the upper-level low. The next day (November 8), Nicole made a sharp left turn to the west-southwest due to a cold front with a low- to mid-level anticyclone to the north of it moving into the western Atlantic north of Nicole. During this time, Nicole strengthened as its inner-core convection improved and the radius of its maximum winds contracted, which resulted in the system transitioning to a tropical cyclone at 18:00 UTC. Although its radius of its maximum winds became smaller, Nicole's interaction with the anticyclone caused its tropical storm wind field in the northern quadrant to grow and by November 10, this wind field had grown to over 400 nmi (740 km) from the center in the northeastern quadrant.

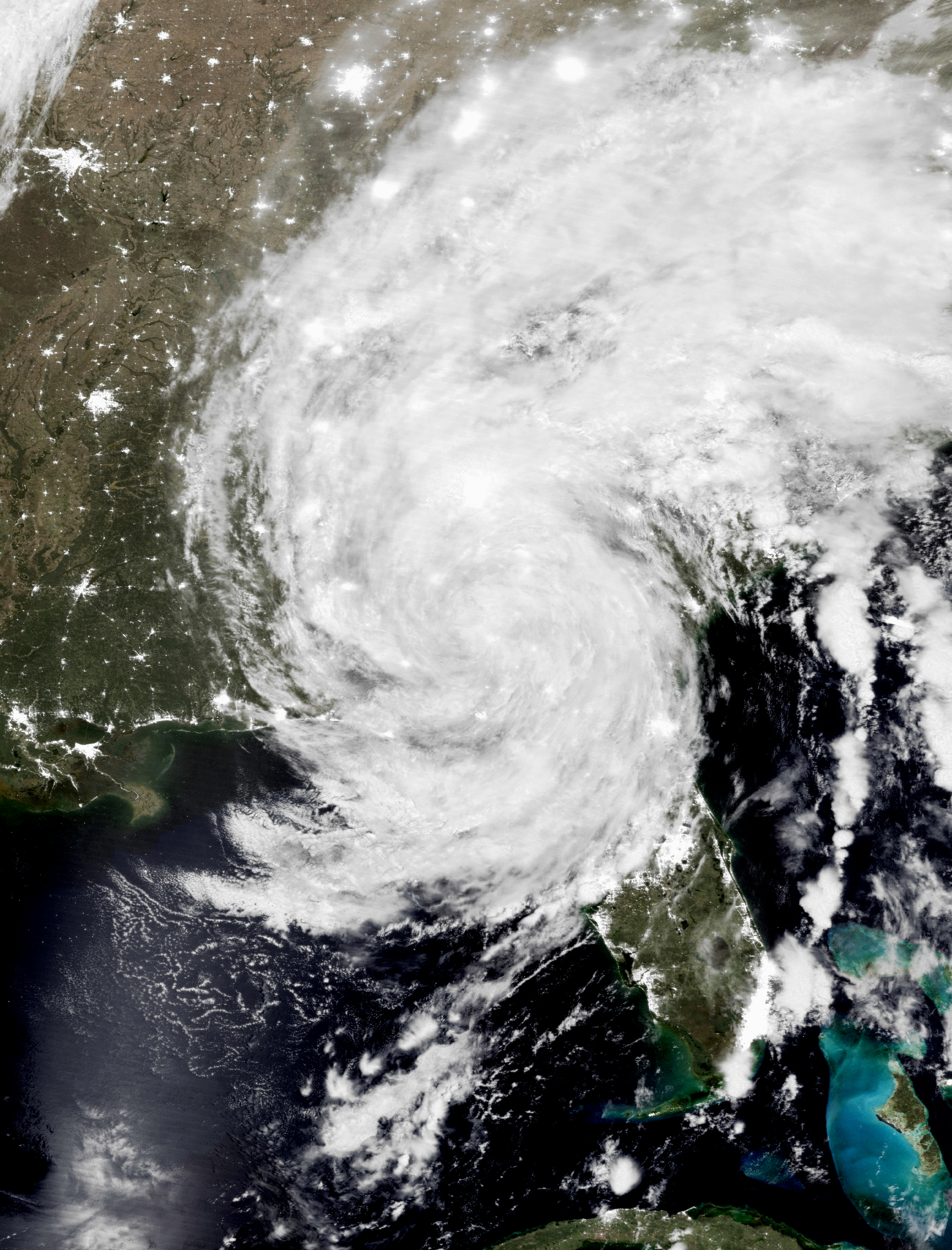
Tropical Depression Nicole moving northward through western Georgia early on November 11.

Early on November 9, Nicole reached its initial peak intensity with sustained winds 70 mph (110 km/h) and a minimum central pressure of 984 mbar (hPa; 29.06 inHg). Strengthening was then halted when mid- to upper-level dry air entrained into the core of Nicole, disrupting the central convection and briefly weakening the storm as it continued moving west-southwestward. This weakening would be short-lived, however, and convection began to reform near the center later that day and a large, ragged eye began to form as Nicole turned westward. At 17:00 UTC, Nicole made landfall at Marsh Harbour, Great Abaco Island, with sustained winds of 70 mph (110 km/h) and a minimum central pressure of 985 mbar (hPa; 29.09 inHg). Continuing westward, the storm strengthened into a Category 1 hurricane while simultaneously making landfall on Grand Bahama at 23:00 UTC that same day with sustained winds of 75 mph (121 km/h) and a minimum central pressure of 980 mbar (hPa; 28.94 inHg). This would be Nicole's peak intensity as another intrusion of dry air disrupted the storm's core convection again and prevented it from strengthening any further. At 07:45 UTC on the following morning (November 10), Nicole made landfall on Vero Beach, Florida, with the same strength. The NHC noted that sampling issues led to uncertainty about the minimum pressure and stated that it could have been lower. They also stated that although Nicole made landfall as a hurricane, the hurricane-force winds were in the northeastern eyewall and likely never made it to the Florida coast as the storm weakened to a tropical storm shortly after landfall.

Nicole continued to weaken as it turned northwestward across the Florida peninsula, though it remained well organized, with tropical storm-force winds extending out 345 mi (555 km) to the northeast of its center. As a result, heavy rains fell across central and northern Florida and southeast Georgia. Later that day, a little before 18:00 UTC, Nicole emerged over the Gulf of Mexico, near Homosassa, Florida. It then made another brief landfall at 19:00 UTC at Cedar Key, in Florida's Big Bend region with sustained winds of 45 mph (72 km/h). The storm continued to weaken as it moved northwestward just offshore before making its final landfall at 00:00 UTC on November 11 at the mouth of the Aucilla River with sustained winds of 40 mph (64 km/h). Nicole weakened to a depression six hours later as it moved into southwest Georgia. Nicole then turned northward and traversed western Georgia between an Atlantic high and a mid-latitude trough and cold front approaching from the west. Later that day, after turning northeastward and moving over extreme western North Carolina into eastern Tennessee, Nicole degenerated into a remnant low at 18:00 UTC before quickly being absorbed into the mid-latitude system shortly thereafter.

== Preparations ==
=== Bahamas ===
Upon the development of Nicole, the Government of the Bahamas issued a tropical storm watch at 09:00 UTC on November 7, for the northwestern Bahamas. This was changed to a hurricane watch three hours later. Then, at 21:00 UTC, a hurricane warning was issued for the northwestern Bahamas, including the Abaco Islands, Berry Islands, Bimini, and Grand Bahama. A tropical storm warning was also issued for Andros Island, New Providence, and Eleuthera. As of 09:00 UTC on November 10, all warnings had been discontinued for the northwestern Bahamas.

Temporary shelters were opened at multiple locations on Grand Bahama and the Abaco Islands. Several hundred people took refuge in them as the storm approached.

=== United States ===
Amtrak cancelled or modified its Auto Train, Silver Meteor, and Silver Star services between November 8 and 11.

==== Florida ====
Florida governor Ron DeSantis declared a state of emergency on November 7, covering 34 counties, including Miami-Dade, Broward, and Palm Beach. President Joe Biden declared an emergency in Florida on November 9, and ordered that federal assistance be provided to state, tribal and local governments to alleviate the impacts of the approaching storm. Tropical storm and hurricane watches, as well as warnings were in effect for the southern portion of Florida, as well as storm surge watches.

Multiple schools were closed throughout several counties, and several Central Florida theme parks, such as SeaWorld Orlando and Busch Gardens Tampa Bay announced that they would be closed on November 10, due to the storm; Universal Orlando and Walt Disney World both expressed the hope to be able to open at some point during the day. The November 10 start date of the Pelican Women's Championship golf tournament at Belleair (west of Tampa), was postponed due to the storm's approach, and the event shortened to 54 holes. An NBA game between the Orlando Magic and Dallas Mavericks started an hour early due to the tropical storm. A Veterans Day parade was cancelled in Jacksonville, as was a ceremony in Hillsborough County. Officials at the Kennedy Space Center delayed the launch of NASA's Artemis 1 by two days, until November 16. The rocket remained on the launchpad during the storm.

The region's major airports: Palm Beach, Daytona Beach and Orlando, suspended operations while Nicole passed through. Additionally, local officials issued mandatory evacuation orders for residents of barrier islands, low-lying areas and mobile homes.

==== Neighboring states ====
Storm surge and tropical storm watches were issued for coastal South Georgia. Also, numerous school systems in South Georgia closed their schools. Tropical storm warnings as well as watches were issued for the coast of South Carolina. Coastal flooding warnings were issued in advance. Severe weather advisories and flash flood warnings were issued for several counties in North Carolina. Also, Hersheypark in South Central Pennsylvania closed on November 11 in preparation of the storm.

== Impact ==
Fatalities and monetary damage
Country	Deaths	Damage (USD)
The Bahamas	0	Unknown
United States	5	>$1 billion
Dominican Republic	6	Unknown
Total:	11	>$1 billion

=== Lesser Antilles ===
Nicole's precursor disturbance brought heavy rains to several islands of the Lesser Antilles, causing floods and landslides. Impacted were Dominica, Saint Lucia, and Guadeloupe, still recovering from the passage of Hurricane Fiona in mid-September. Antigua and Barbuda, Saint Kitts and Nevis, and the British Virgin Islands also observed heavy rain. No major storm damage or loss of life was reported.

=== Greater Antilles ===
Torrential rains of 4–8 in (100–200 mm) fell on Puerto Rico on November 4–6. Similar rain totals were reported in the Dominican Republic. Some locations around the capital, Santo Domingo, received up to 9.1 in (232 mm); at least six people were killed indirectly by the storm. Additionally, several hundred homes were damaged and the country's agricultural sector was adversely impacted.

=== Bahamas ===
Flooding and storm surge inundated Grand Bahama, Great Abaco, and New Providence, among other islands. Also, downed trees and power outages were reported across the northwestern Bahamas. Storm surge of nearly 4 ft (1.2 m) was reported near Treasure Cay on Great Abaco. Surge-related waves flooded some parts of Nassau, on New Providence. There were no reports of serious injuries or deaths as a result of the storm in the Bahamas.

=== United States ===
Hurricane Nicole approaching and making landfall on the east coast of Florida on November 10

==== Florida ====
Nicole brought major storm surge flooding to Florida's east coast. Nearly 50 coastal condominiums, single-family homes and hotels in Volusia County, previously damaged by Hurricane Ian six weeks earlier, collapsed or were put at danger of collapsing due to severe beach erosion caused by the two storms. Additionally, in St. Johns County, the surging ocean damaged a 6-to-7 mi-long (9.7-to-11.3 km) section of State Road A1A and flooded parts of St. Augustine. In neighboring Flagler County, A1A collapsed for a second time since Ian due to the dunes being eroded. An initial cost estimate of property damage in Volusia and Flagler counties combined exceeds $500 million. On the morning of November 10, the ocean water level in Jacksonville was 3.58 ft (1.09 m) above high tide, surpassing the record of 3.21 ft (0.98 m) set by Hurricane Matthew in 2016. Storm surge of 1 to 2 ft (0.61 m) also occurred on the western coast of the Florida, causing minor impacts.

There were five indirect deaths in Florida as a result of Nicole. Two people were killed after being electrocuted by downed power lines in Conway. Two people were killed in a crash on Florida's Turnpike. Another person was found dead in Cocoa on a yacht.

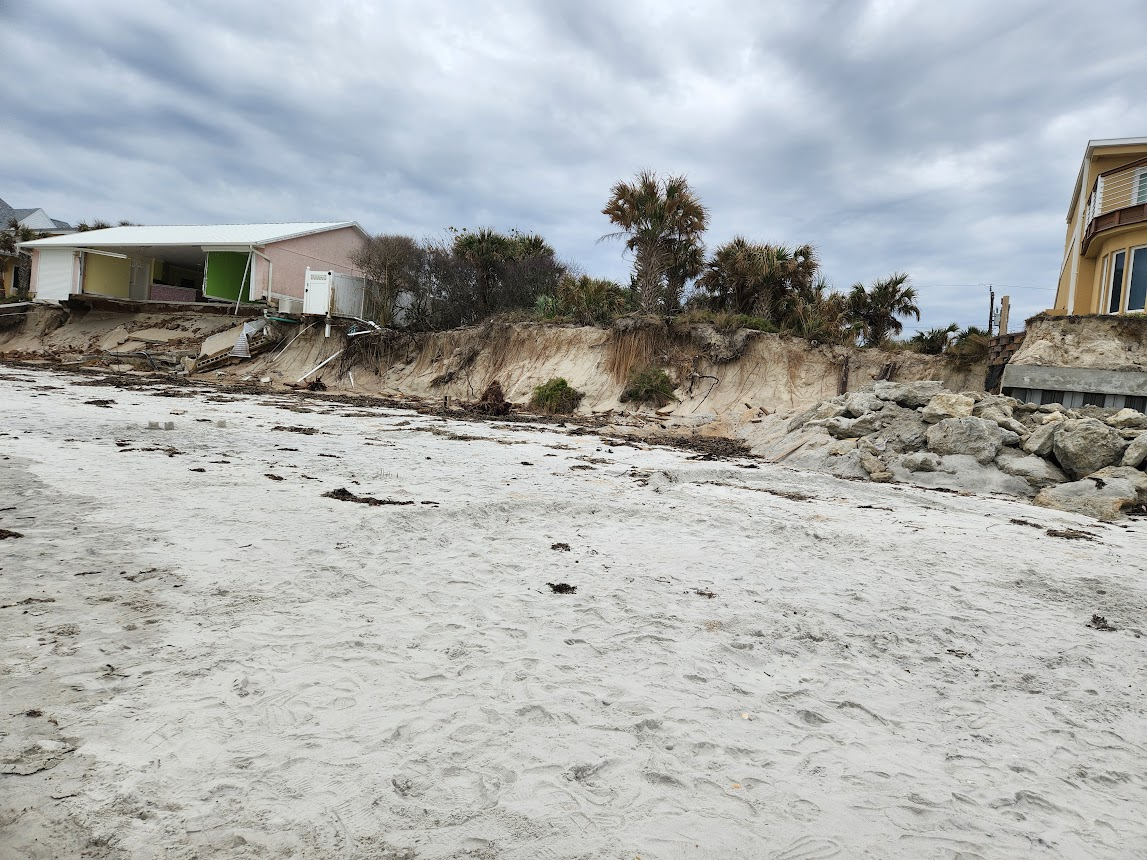
Remains of dunes and a house, just south of New Smyrna Beach, Florida, weeks after the hurricane.

While the strongest sustained winds of Nicole likely weakened below hurricane force before reaching the coast, wind gusts at or near hurricane strength were recorded at multiple weather stations as Nicole came ashore, including 75 mph (121 km/h) at Port St. John and 72 mph (116 km/h) at Melbourne; inland, a wind gust of 66 mph (106 km/h) was recorded at Orlando. The highest wind gust, 100 mph (160 km/h), was recorded atop Launch Complex 39B at the Kennedy Space Center, where Artemis 1 was on the pad. The rocket suffered minor damage, but was cleared for launch by NASA following repairs, and was successfully launched on November 16.

Human remains at what is believed to be a Native American burial site on South Hutchinson Island were unearthed by storm erosion, near the point of landfall. Previously, hurricanes Dorian, in 2019, and Sandy, in 2012, unearthed centuries old bones of Native Americans in that same general area.

Much of Florida experienced heavy rains, gusty winds, and power outages as Nicole moved across the state. More than 300,000 homes and businesses lost power statewide.

==== Elsewhere ====
Nicole brought heavy rainfall and gusting winds to much of the southeastern U.S. In South Georgia, 2,700 customers lost power. Storm surge driven flooding was reported as far north as Charleston, South Carolina.

Portions of North Carolina and Virginia were under a tornado watch on November 11; two short-lived EF0 tornadoes were confirmed near Tignor and Dinwiddie, Virginia with damage limited to trees, outbuildings, and farm equipment. A soaking rain fell upon the North Carolina mountains: the highest total was 8.39 in (213 mm) near Mount Mitchell State Park.

The frontal system that absorbed Hurricane Nicole on November 11 caused rainfall across the Northeastern United States.2.36 in (60 mm) of rain fell in Pittsburgh, Pennsylvania, setting a new record for that day. In Youngstown, Ohio, 2.31 in (59 mm) of rain fell; it was the city's wettest day of the year. Portions of I-81 in Pennsylvania briefly closed due to flooding. In the New York metropolitan area, 900 customers lost power as Nicole's remnant winds and rains moved through.

=== Canada ===
In Canada, the storm caused heavy rain and wind in much of the Maritime provinces, as well as Quebec. At Montréal-Pierre Elliott Trudeau International Airport, the storm dropped 65.2 mm (2.57 in) of rainfall. In Nova Scotia 13,000 customers lost power, with gusts reaching 79 km/h (49 mph) at Halifax Stanfield International Airport. In Newfoundland, heavy rain fell, accumulating to 56 mm (2.2 in) in Burgeo. Snow also fell in the northern parts of the province, with up to 10 cm (3.9 in) in Badger and La Scie.

== Aftermath ==
In Volusia County, certain homeowners were permitted to continue building their seawalls beyond May 1, 2023, the start of turtle breeding season. Brevard County, Florida began a program to restore its beaches damaged by Nicole and Ian which is planned to finish by April 2025.

== See also ==
- Weather of 2022
- Tropical cyclones in 2022
- Timeline of the 2022 Atlantic hurricane season
- List of Florida hurricanes (2000–present)
- List of costliest Atlantic hurricanes
- List of Category 1 Atlantic hurricanes
- Other storms of the same name
- 1949 Florida hurricane – Category 4 hurricane that had a similar track
- Hurricane Gordon (1994) – made landfall on the western coast of Florida in November as a tropical storm
- Hurricane Erin (1995) – Category 2 hurricane that had a similar track
- Hurricane Jeanne (2004) – Category 3 hurricane that had a similar track
- Hurricane Eta (2020) – made landfall on the western coast of Florida in November as a tropical storm
