= Altmann (bishop of Passau) =

Bishop of Passau from 1065 to 1091

Blessed Altmann
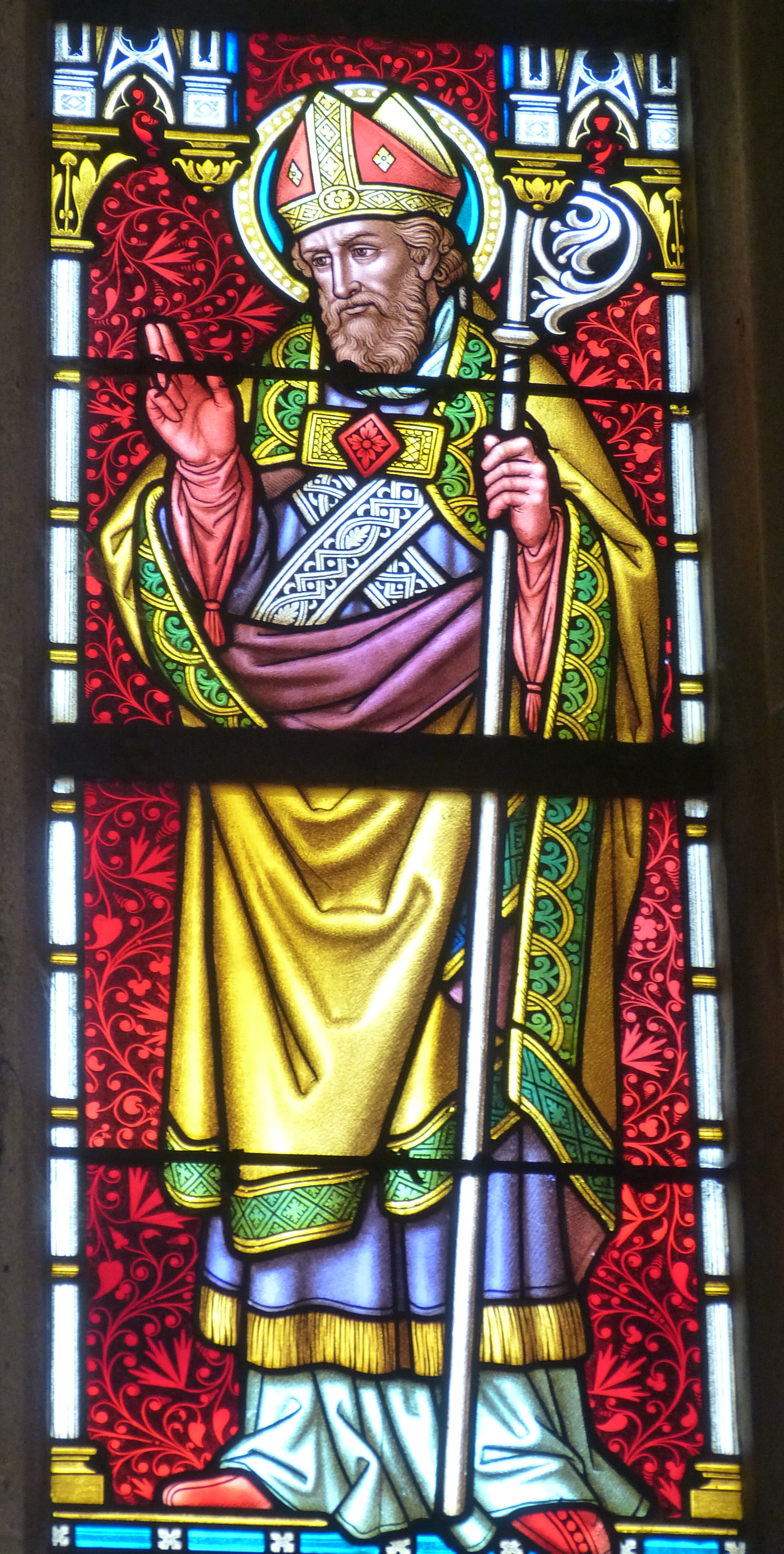

Bishop of Passau
- Born: c. 1015
- Died: 8 August 1091
- Honored in: Catholic Church (informally)
- Canonized: Uncanonised
- Feast: 8 August

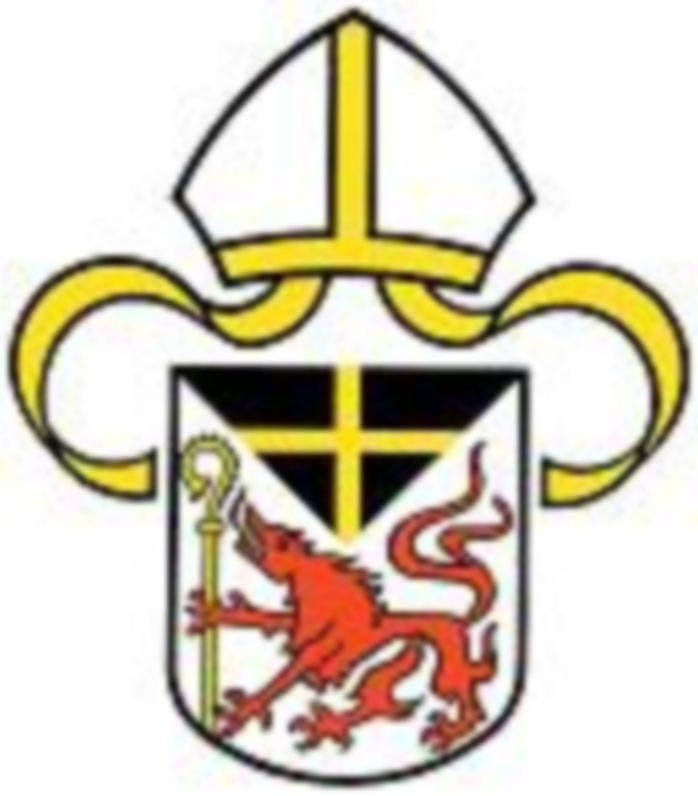
Coat of arms of Passau

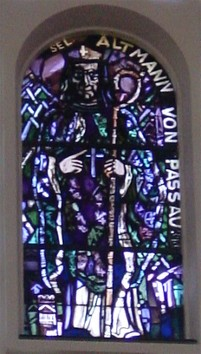
Portrait in stained glass, Church Liesing

Altmann (c. 1015 – 8 August 1091) was the Bishop of Passau from 1065 until his death. He was an important representative of the Gregorian reforms, monastic founder and reformer. He is venerated as a saint. Although he was not recognized through a formal canonization process, he is considered a saint in the Catholic Church and is commemorated on August 8.

== Life ==
He was born between 1013 and 1020 in Westphalia to a family of the greater nobility of Saxony. He was educated at the cathedral school at Paderborn, of which he later became director. He was also a prebendary in Aachen between 1056 and 1065, court chaplain to Emperor Henry III and a canon in Goslar.

In 1065 he succeeded Egilbert as Bishop of Passau and began reforms of the clergy. As bishop he was famous for his care of the poor, his vigor in the reformation of relaxed monasteries, and the building of new ones. He founded St. Nicholas' Abbey in Passau in 1070 as a monastery of the Canons Regular, and Göttweig Abbey in Lower Austria in 1083, later converted into a Benedictine monastery in 1094.

In 1074 he announced the reforms of Pope Gregory VII, whom he supported in the subsequent Investiture Controversy. Altmann was the most zealous promoter of the Church reform in the German lands. In 1076, along with the Archbishop of Salzburg, Gebhard von Helfenstein (who had consecrated Altmann as a bishop), he did not take part in the Reichstag of Worms, and supported the counter-king Rudolf of Swabia. He was expelled from Passau by Emperor Henry IV, who laid the city to waste in 1077/1078. The princely rights over the town of Passau were lost, the king lent them to the Burggrave Ulrich, whom he had employed. These were to be returned to the bishops only after the death of the Burggrave in 1099.

Altmann took part in the Lenten synods 1079 and 1080 in Rome. He was appointed papal legate for Germany, and was able to win the Margrave Leopold II of Austria over to the papal party. In 1085 the Emperor deposed him as Bishop of Passau, after which he spent most of his time in the territory of the Austrian margrave, where he reformed the existing monasteries of St. Florian, Kremsmünster Abbey, Melk and St. Pölten Abbey, improved the parish church organisation, and had stone churches built at all of them. His influence on the government of the margraviate was at times so strong that he was called the "leader" of Margrave Leopold II. He died in Zeiselmauer in Lower Austria and was buried in the monastery of Göttweig Abbey. He is venerated as a saint, although no official canonization has ever taken place. His feast day is 8 August.

The Vita of Altmann of Passau was written by an anonymous monk of Göttweig some fifty years after the bishop's death.

== Sources ==
- Tomek, Ernst, 1935-39: Kirchengeschichte Österreichs. Innsbruck - Wien - München: Tyrolia.
- Tropper, C., 1983: Der heilige Altmann. In: 900 Jahre Stift Göttweig 1083-1983. Ein Donaustift als Repräsentant benediktinischer Kultur. (Exhibition catalogue) Göttweig.
- Wodka, Josef, 1959: Kirche in Österreich. Wegweiser durch ihre Geschichte. Vienna: Herder.
- Fuchs, Adalbert, 1929: Der heilige Altmann. Kleine historische Monographien; 18.
- Anon., 1965: Der heilige Altmann Bischof von Passau.
- Wiedemann, Theodor (1851). Altmann, Bischof zu Passau, nach seinem Leben und Wirken. (in German). Augsburg: Kollmann, 1851.
- "Vita Beati Altmanni Episcopi Pataviensis," in: Pez, Hieronymus (1721). Scriptores rerum Austriacarum, Tomus 1. (in Latin). Leipzig: Sumptibus Joh. Frid. Gleditschii b. filii, 1721, pp. 109-163.
- Hansiz, Marcus. Germaniae sacræ: Metropolis Lauriacensis cum Episcopatu Pataviensi. (in Latin). Tomus I (1727). Augusta Vindelicorum (Augsburg): Happach & Schlüter, pp. 255-284.
