= Saint Nicholas (disambiguation) =

Saint Nicholas was a 4th-century saint and Greek Bishop of Myra.

Saint Nicholas or Saint Nick may also refer to:

- Santa Claus or Saint Nicholas, a western folk legend inspired by the saint
- Sinterklaas or Sint-Nicolaas, the Dutch variant of the folk legend
- Saint Nicholas, a gift-bringing figure in Europe
- Saint Nicholas Day, the feast day of the saint

== People ==
- Nicholas (died 320), one of the Forty Martyrs of Sebaste
- Nicholas of Sion (died 564) early Christian saint
- Nicholas the Pilgrim (1075–1094), also known as Nicholas of Trani, fool for Christ

=== Eastern Orthodox ===
- Nicholas Kabasilas (c. 1322–1392), Byzantine mystic, theological writer and priest
- Nicholas of Lesvos (died 1463), Greek deacon and new martyr
- Nicholas of Japan (1836–1912), Russian archbishop and missionary who introduced Eastern Orthodoxy to Japan
- Nicholas II (1868–1918), also known as Nicholas the Passion-Bearer, last emperor of Russia
- Nicholas Planas of Athens (1851–1932), Greek priest, feast day February 17 and March 2
- Nicholas of Ohrid and Žiča (1881–1956), also known as Nikolaj Velimirović, Serbian bishop and writer

=== Roman Catholic ===
- Pope Nicholas I (c. 800–867), also known as Nicholas the Great, bishop of Rome from 858 to 867
- Nicholas of Tolentino (c. 1246–1303), Italian mystic
- Nicholas of Flüe (1417–1487), Swiss hermit and ascetic
- Nicholas Pieck (1534–1572), Dutch martyr
- Nicholas Owen (Jesuit) (c. 1550–1606), English martyr
- Niels of Aarhus (before 1157–1180), Danish prince

== Places ==
- Saint Nicholas Peak (Canada), Alberta and British Columbia, Canada
- St. Nicholas, Prince Edward Island, Canada
- St. Nicholas, (civil parish, County Galway), a civil parish in the barony of Galway, County Galway, Ireland
- St. Nicholas, (civil parish, County Wexford), a civil parish in the barony of Ballaghkeen South, County Wexford, Ireland
- St. Nicholas, Vale of Glamorgan, Wales
  - St Nicholas and Bonvilston, a Welsh community in Vale of Glamorgan
- St. Nicholas, Jacksonville, Florida, United States
- Saint Nicholas, Michigan, an unincorporated community
- Mount Saint Nicholas, Montana, United States
- St Nicholas-at-Wade, Kent, England
- Saint Nicholas Avenue (Manhattan), New York City, United States
- St. Nicholas Cove, Coronation Island, Antarctica
- St Nicholas Hurst, a civil parish in Berkshire, England
- St. Nicholas's Island, a former name of Drake's Island, Plymouth Sound, England

== Other uses ==
- Saint Nicolas, a 1948 cantata with music by Benjamin Britten and text by Eric Crozier
- St. Nicholas Centre, a shopping centre in Aberdeen, Scotland, now part of the Bon Accord Centre
- St. Nicholas, a children's magazine published in the United States (1873–1943)
- Botik of Peter the Great or Saint Nichols, a miniature warship
- Sint or Saint Nick, a 2010 Dutch comedy horror film
- St Nicholas, Richmond, historic building in North Yorkshire, England

== See also ==
- St. Nicholas Church (disambiguation), includes pages without "Church" in their names
- Saint Nicholas Monastery (disambiguation)
- Saint Nicolas (disambiguation)
- San Nicola (disambiguation)
- San Nicolás (disambiguation)
- São Nicolau (disambiguation)
- Sveti Nikola (disambiguation)
- Agios Nikolaos (disambiguation)
- Nicholas (disambiguation)
