= São Nicolau =

São Nicolau, meaning "Saint Nicholas" in Portuguese, may refer to the following places:

== Brazil ==
- São Nicolau (Rio Grande do Sul), a municipality of the state of Rio Grande do Sul
- São Nicolau River, a river in the state of Piauí

== Cape Verde ==
- São Nicolau, Cape Verde, an island

== Portugal ==
- São Nicolau, Lisbon, a parish of the municipality of Lisbon
- São Nicolau, Porto, a parish of the municipality of Porto
- São Nicolau, Marco de Canaveses, a parish of the municipality of Marco de Canaveses
- São Nicolau, Mesão Frio, a parish of the municipality of Mesão Frio
- São Nicolau, Santarém, a parish of the municipality of Santarém.

== See also ==
- Saint Nicholas (disambiguation)
