= Nichole =

Nichole is a feminine given name. Notable people with this name include:

- Nichole de Carle (born 1984), British fashion designer best known for her lingerie and swimwear brand
- Nichole Cheza (born 1987), American motorcycle racer
- Nichole Denby (born 1982), US-born Nigerian track and field athlete
- Nichole Hiltz (born 1978), American actress
- Nichole Mead (born 1988), American beauty pageant titleholder
- Nichole Millage (born 1977), American Paralympic volleyball player
- Nichole Nordeman (born 1972), American Christian singer–songwriter
- Nichole Sakura (born 1989), American actress and model

== See also ==
- Nicole (disambiguation)
