= Niccolò III =

Niccolò III may refer to:

- Niccolò III dalle Carceri (died in 1383)
- Nicholas III Zorzi, Margrave of Bodonitsa from 1416 to 1436
- Niccolò III d'Este, Marquis of Ferrara (1383–1441)

== See also ==
- Nicholas III (disambiguation)
- Niccolò (name)
