= Nikola II =

Nikola II may refer to:

- Nikola II Gorjanski (1367–1433)
- Nikola II Petrović (born in 1944)

== See also ==
- Nikola Two, a truck from the Nikola Motor Company
- Nicholas II (disambiguation)
- Nikola (disambiguation)
