= Nikola III =

Nikola III may refer to:

- Nikola III Erdödy (1630–1693)
- Nikola III Ogramić (died 1701), Roman Catholic bishop of Bosnia, see Roman Catholic Diocese of Bosnia
- Nikola III Zrinski (1488–1534)

== See also ==
- Nikola Tre (Nikola 3), battery-electric truck from the Nikola Motor Company, aimed for production in 2021
- Nikola (disambiguation)
- Nicholas III (disambiguation)
