= Sveti Nikola =

Sveti Nikola (Cyrillic: Свети Никола, lit. 'Saint Nicholas') may refer to:

- Sveti Nikola (village), a village in Kavarna Municipality, Bulgaria
- Sveti Nikola (song), a 2009 song by Kerber
- Sveti Nikola Island (Budva), an island in the Adriatic Sea in Montenegro
- Sveti Nikola Fortress, a fortified island in the Adriatic Sea near Šibenik, Croatia
- Sveti Nikola island (Poreč), an island in the Adriatic Sea by Poreč
- Sveti Nikola, Rijeka, a section of Rijeka, Croatia
- Sveti Nikola (magazine), a magazine published by the Archdiocese of Bar

== See also ==
- Saint Nicholas (disambiguation)
- Nikola (disambiguation)
