= Nikolai =

Nikolai or Nikolay is an East Slavic variant of the masculine name Nicholas. It may refer to:

== People ==
=== Royalty ===
- Nicholas I of Russia (1796–1855), or Nikolay I, Emperor of Russia from 1825 until 1855
- Nicholas II of Russia (1868–1918), or Nikolay II, last Emperor of Russia, from 1894 until 1917
- Count Nikolai of Monpezat, formerly Prince Nikolai of Denmark (born 1999)

=== Other people ===
==== Nikolai ====
- Nikolai Aleksandrovich (disambiguation) or Nikolay Aleksandrovich, several people
- Nikolai Antropov (born 1980), Kazakh former ice hockey winger
- Nikolai Berdyaev (1874–1948), Russian religious and political philosopher
- Nikolai Bogomolov (born 1991), Russian professional ice hockey defenceman
- Nikolai Bukharin (1888–1938), Bolshevik revolutionary and Soviet politician
- Nikolai Bulganin (1895–1975), Soviet politician and minister of defence
- Nikolai Chernykh (1931–2004), Russian astronomer
- Nikolai Chernyshev (1906–1953), Soviet rocket scientist
- Nikolai Dmitriev (1829–1823), Russian composer
- Nikolai Dmitriev (1898–1954), Soviet linguist
- Nikolai Dudorov (1906–1977), Soviet politician
- Nikolai Dzhumagaliev (born 1952), Soviet serial killer
- Nikolai Goc (born 1986), German ice hockey player
- Nikolai Gogol (1809–1852), Russian dramatist and novelist
- Nikolai Fraiture (born 1978) American bassist for The Strokes
- Nikolai Hopland (born 2004), Norwegian footballer
- Nikolai Khabibulin (born 1973), Russian former ice hockey goaltender
- Nikolai Kinski (born 1976), film actor
- Nikolai Kotlyar (1935–2003), Soviet engineer, maritime specialist and politician
- Nikolai Kulemin (born 1986), Russian ice hockey winger
- Nikolai Lobachevsky (1792–1856), Russian mathematician and geometer
- Nikolai Lukashenko (born 2004), third son of Alexander Lukashenko, the president of Belarus
- Nikolai Maspanov (born 1945), Estonian politician
- Nikolai Medtner (1880–1951), Russian composer and pianist
- Nikolai Melnikov (born 1948), Soviet Olympic champion water polo player
- Nikolai Myaskovsky (1881–1950), Russian composer
- Nikolai Novosjolov (born 1980), Estonian fencer
- Nikolai Onoprienko (1911–1979), Soviet Red Army colonel
- Nikolai Pegov (1905–1991), Soviet official and diplomat
- Nikolai Pozdneev (1930–1978), Russian painter
- Nikolai Przhevalsky (1839–1888), Russian geographer and explorer
- Nikolai Rimsky-Korsakov (1844–1908), Russian composer
- Nikolai Rubinstein (1835–1881), Russian painter, conductor and composer
- Nikolai Ryzhkov (1929-2024), Russian politician
- Nikolai Shchelokov (1910–1984), Soviet statesman and army general
- Nikolai Sinebrychoff (1789-1848), Russian businessman
- Nikolai Slichenko (1934–2021), Soviet and Russian singer, actor, and theatre director
- Nikolai Tanayev (1945–2020), Kyrgyz politician
- Nikolai Tcherepnin (1873–1945), Russian composer, pianist, and conductor
- Nikolai Tikhonov (writer) (1896–1979), Soviet writer
- Nikolai Tikhonov (1905–1997), Russian politician
- Nikolai Timkov (1912–1993), Russian painter
- Nikolai Topor-Stanley (born 1985), Australian footballer
- Nikolai Tirkkonen (1875-1926), Finnish merchant
- Nikolai Valuev (born 1973), Russian boxer and world heavyweight champion
- Nikolai Vavilov (1887–1943), Russian botanist and geneticist
- Nikolai Volkoff (1947–2018), professional WWF wrestler
- Nikolai Yezhov (1895–1940), head of NKVD and perpetrator of the Great Purge
- Nikolai Zherdev (born 1984), Russian ice hockey player

=== Fictional character ===
- Nikolai "Sledge" Slidjonovitch, a supportive characters of Quake IV video game
- Nikolai Gogol from the manga and anime series Bungou Stray Dogs

==== Nikolay ====
- Nikolay Baskov (born 1976), Russian singer
- Nikolay Bobrikov (1839-1904), Russian Governor-General of Finland
- Nikolay Davydenko (born 1981), professional tennis player
- Nikolay Dollezhal (1899–2000), Soviet nuclear reactor designer, head of NIKIET from 1952–1986
- Nikolay Epshtein (1919–2005), Soviet ice hockey coach
- Nikolay Pechalov (born 1970), Olympic and World champion in weightlifting
- Nikolay Peskov (born 1990), Russian army veteran
- Nikolay Rastorguev (born 1957), lead singer of the Russian group Lyube
- Nikolay Shubin (born 1956), Georgian-born Russian serial killer

== Other uses ==
- Nikolai, Alaska, a city in the United States
  - Nikolai Airport, an airport serving Nikolai, Alaska
- Nikolai (vodka), a brand of vodka

== See also ==
- , includes many people with first given name Nikolai
- , includes many people with first given name Nikolay
- Kolja (disambiguation)
- Kolya (disambiguation)
- Nikola (disambiguation)
- Nicola (disambiguation)
- Nicolai (disambiguation)
- Nikolayev (surname)
