= Nikola I =

Nikola I may refer to:

- Nikola I Gorjanski (died 1386)
- Nicholas I of Montenegro (1841–1921)

== See also ==
- Nikola One, a model of truck from the Nikola Motor Company
- Nicholas I (disambiguation)
- Nikola (disambiguation)
