= Saint Nicholas Monastery =

Saint Nicholas Monastery may refer to:

- Saint Nicholas Monastery (Mukacheve), Ukraine
- Saint Nicholas Monastery, Jaffa, Israel
- Peshtera Monastery of Saint Nicholas of Myra, Bulgaria

== See also ==
- Saint Nicholas (disambiguation)
- St. Nicholas Church (disambiguation)
