= Nicholas (disambiguation) =

Nicholas is a male given name and a surname.

Nicholas may also refer to:

- Nicholas (telenovela), a 1958 Brazilian telenovela
- Nicholas (album), an album by Nicholas Teo
- Nicholas (novel), a 1924 children's fantasy novel by Anne Carroll Moore
- Nicholas (duo), American gospel music husband and wife duo
- Mount Nicholas
- Nicholas, United States Virgin Islands
- Nicholas, Virginia
- Cyclone Nicholas

== See also ==
- Nicholas County (disambiguation)
- Saint Nicholas (disambiguation)
- Nicola (disambiguation)
- Nicole (disambiguation)
- Nikola (disambiguation)
- Nikolai (disambiguation)
- Nick (disambiguation)
