= Nicola =

Nicola may refer to:

== People ==
- Nicola (name), including a list of people with the given name or, less commonly, the surname
  - Nicola (artist) or Nicoleta Alexandru, singer who represented Romania at the 2003 Eurovision Song Contest
- Nicola people, an extinct Athapaskan people of the Nicola Valley in British Columbia, Canada, and a modern alliance now residing there
  - Nicola language, an extinct Athabascan language

== Places ==
- Nicola River, British Columbia, Canada
  - Nicola Country, a region of British Columbia around the river
  - Nicola Lake, a lake near the upper reaches of the river
  - Nicola, British Columbia, a hamlet on the river

== Arts, entertainment, and media ==
- Nicola (album) (1967), by Scottish folk musician Bert Jansch
- Nicola (magazine), a Japanese fashion magazine
- Nicola (composition), a piano composition by Steve Race
- "Nicola" (Suspect), a 2022 television episode

== Other uses ==
- Nicola (apple), trade name of an apple cultivar
- MV Nicola, a ferryboat in British Columbia, Canada
- Nicola (sponge), a genus of sponges in the family Clathrinidae
- NiCola, a variety of La Croix Sparkling Water

== See also ==
- Lower Nicola, British Columbia, a community on the Nicola River
- Nicola Tribal Association, the formal government of the aforementioned Nicola peoples
  - Shackan First Nation, aka the Lower Nicola Indian Band, a government of the Nicola Tribal Association
  - Upper Nicola Indian Band, a government of the Nicola Tribal Association
- Nikola (disambiguation)
