= Church of St. Nikola, Dobrelja =

Church of St. Nikola
- Црква светог Николе
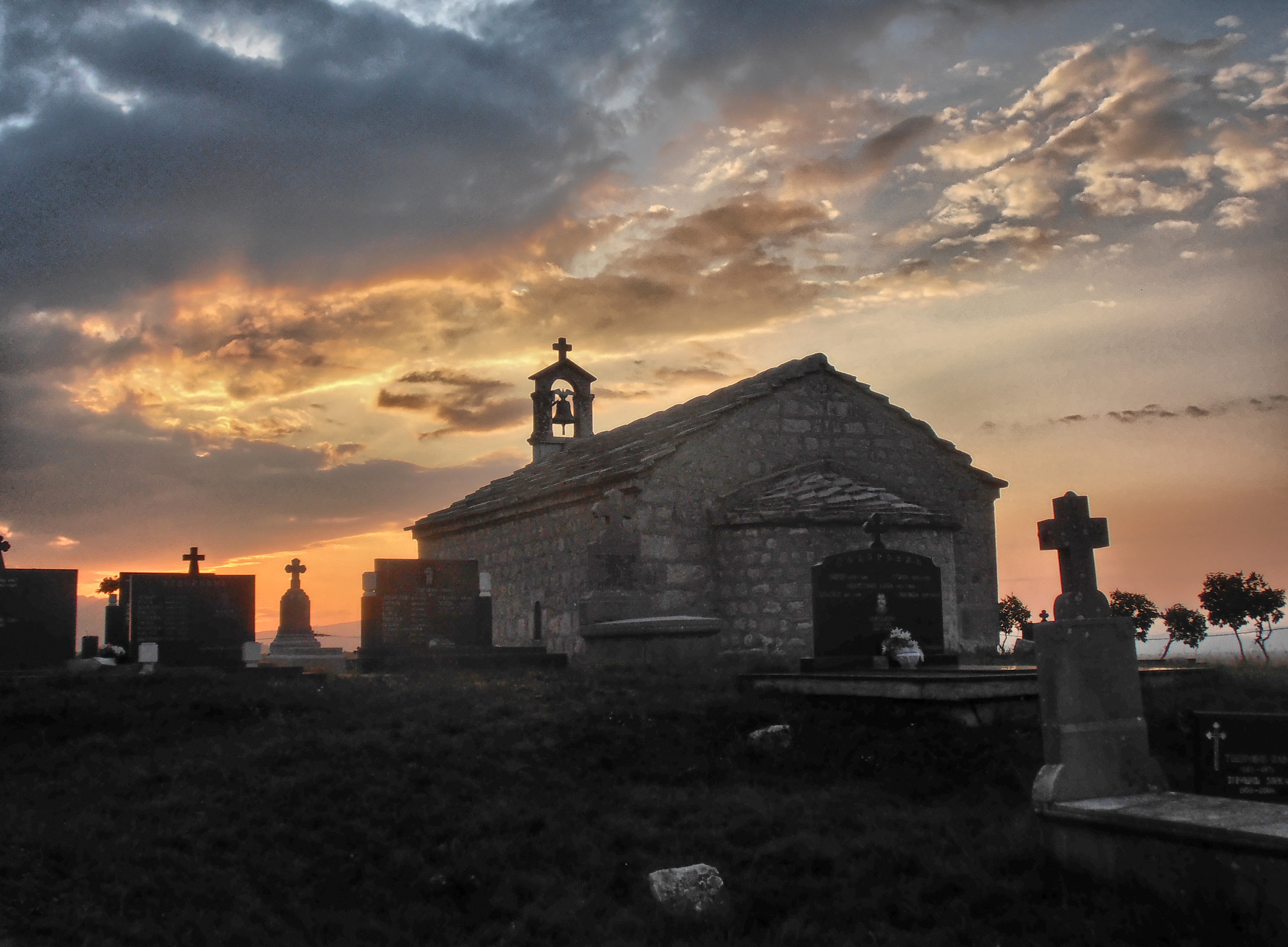
- Church of St Nikola (Dobrelja)

- Location within Bosnia and Herzegovina
- 43.082624°N 18.606654°E
- Location: Gacko
- Country: Bosnia and Herzegovina
- Denomination: Serbian Orthodox Church

History
- Dedication: St. Nikola
- Consecrated: 2001

Architecture
- Heritage designation: National Monument
- Designated: 14 June 2000
- Years built: 1884-1889
- Completed: 1889

Specifications
- Materials: Limestone

The Church of St Nikola is located in Dobrelja village, in Bosnia and Herzegovina, municipality of Gacko, Republic of Srpska entity. The church was rebuilt between 1884 and 1889. The temple was consecrated in 2001.

== National monument ==
The Church of St Nikola was declared a National Monument of Bosnia and Herzegovina, and declared by Commission to preserve national monuments of Bosnia and Herzegovina on 14 June 2000.

== Gallery ==
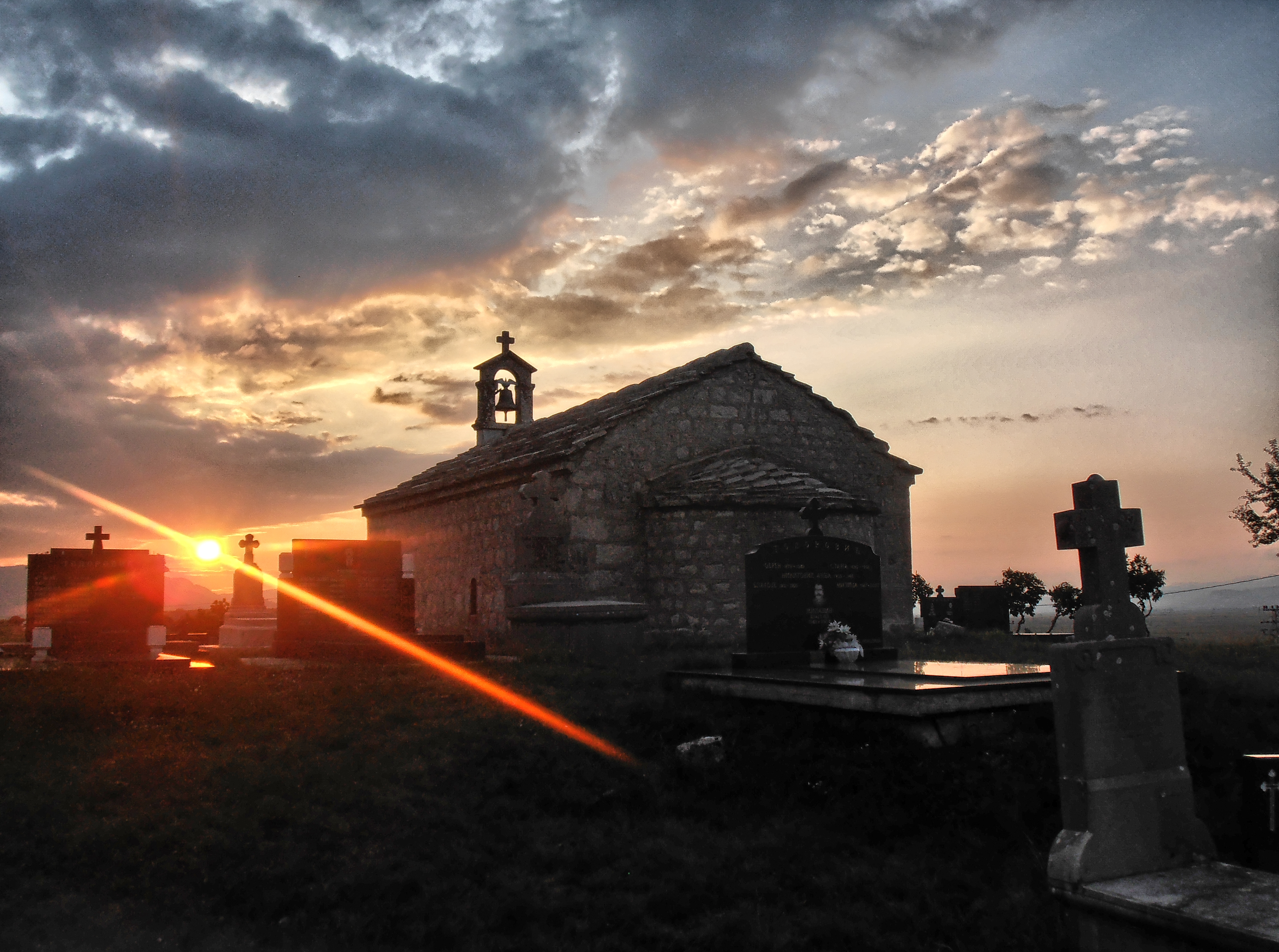

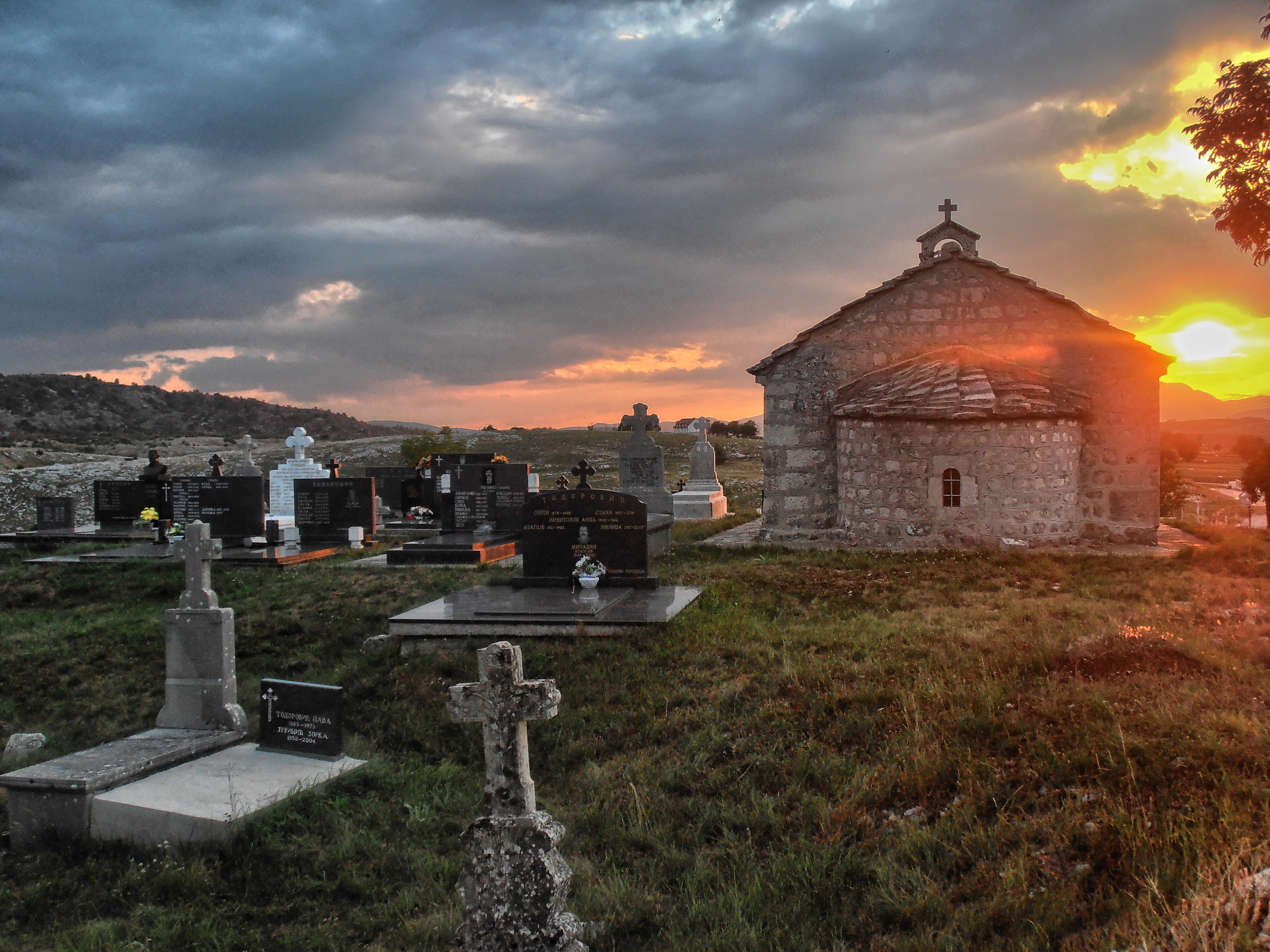

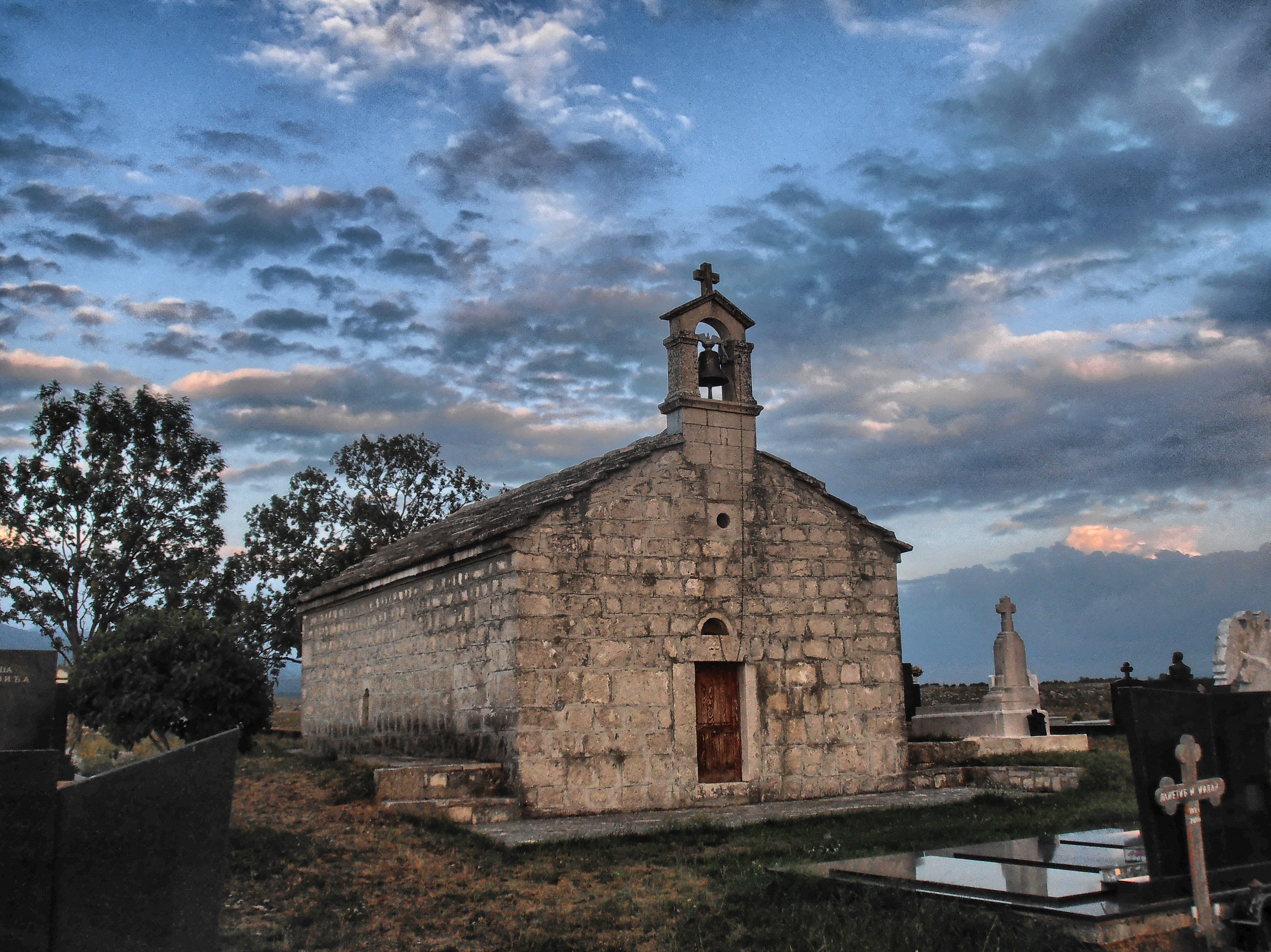

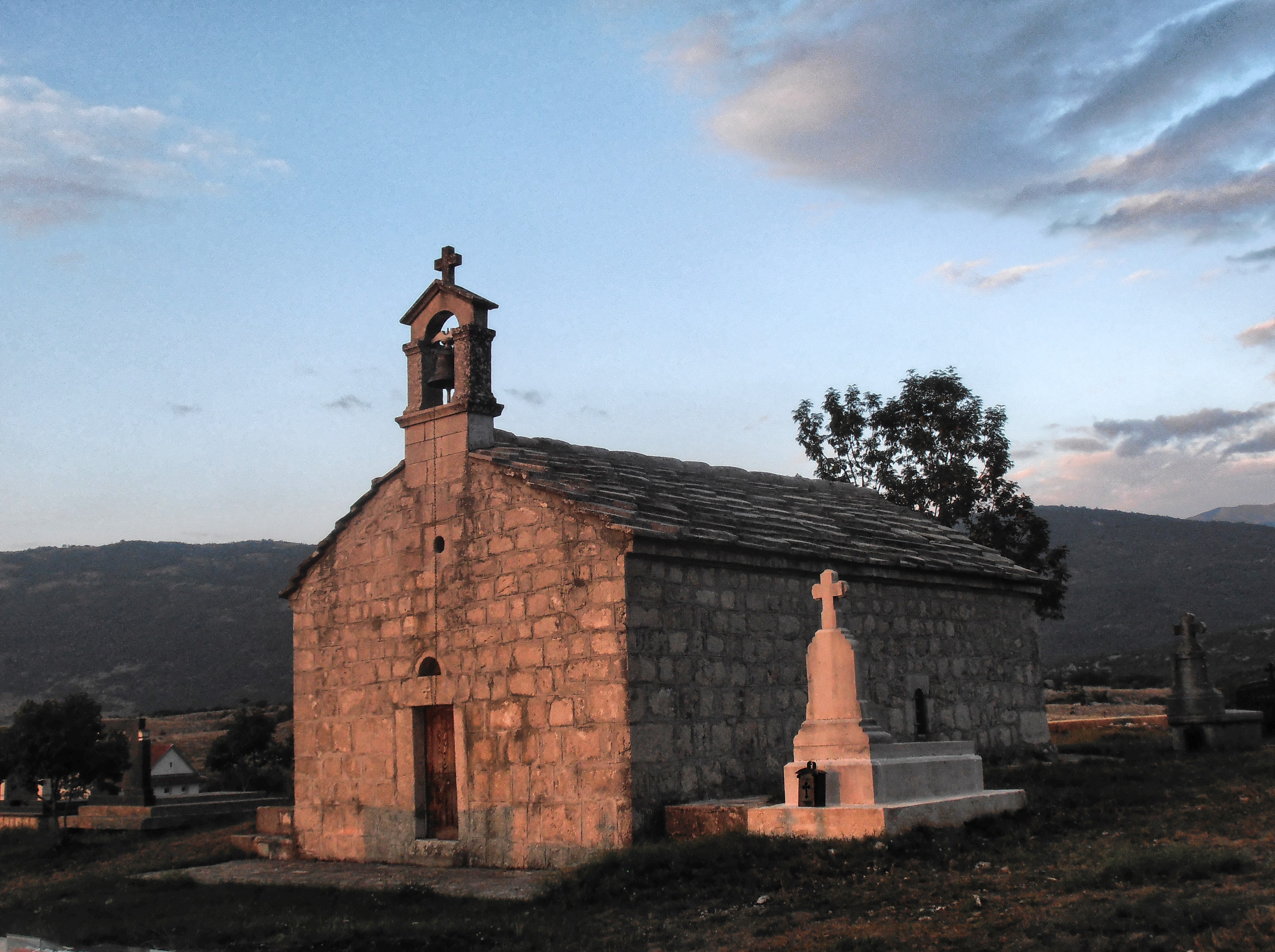

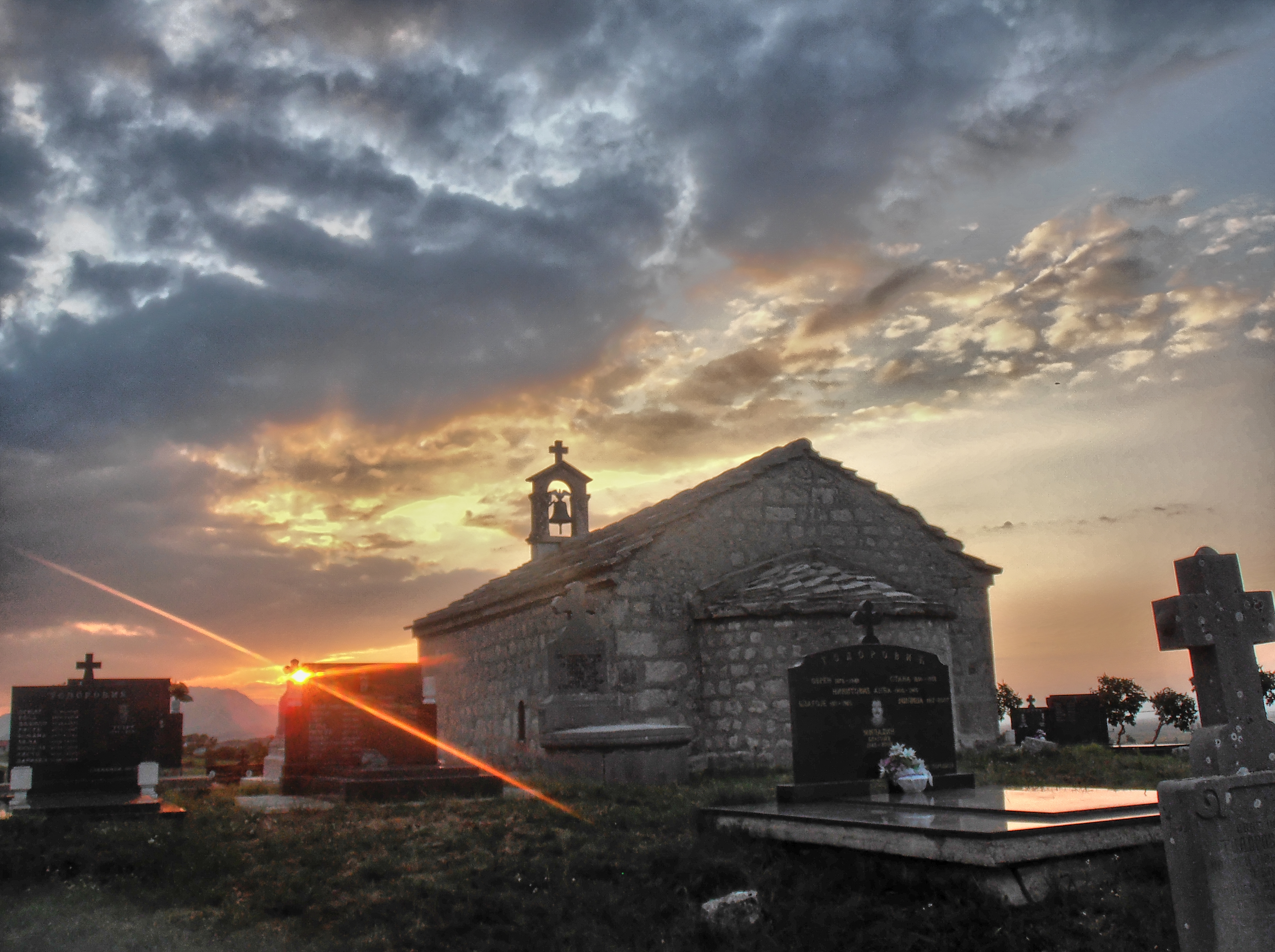
