= Kolya Korobov =

Russian child singer (born 2004)

Nikolay Maksimovich Korobov Николай Коробов
- Born: 14 December 2004 (age 21); Russia
- Genres: Pop
- Occupation: Singer
- Instrument: Vocals

External videos
- YouTube «Ямайка»
- «Найди меня»
- «Недотрога»
- «Будем танцевать»
- «Я попал»

Nikolay Maksimovich Korobov, (stage name: Kolya Korobov; Russian: Николай Максимович Коробов; born 14 December 2004) is a Russian singer. He is a five-time nominee of the Kinder Muz Awards 2017, a nominee for the RU.TV award and the presenter of the S.T.A.R.S. GIRLS by Alex Vorobyov & Kolya Korobov program on Zhara television. Since 2020 — host of his own program Happy Hit Non Stop on the EuropaPlusTV channel.

== Early life ==
Kolya Korobov was born on 14 December 2004.

== Career ==
In 2015 he debuted on "До звезды" (Towards the Star Talk Show) after which he received an invitation to conduct the Junior Chart Hit parade on Russian Music Box. In the same year, he released the song "Маленькие боссы" (Little Bosses) featured in a clip that starred Dmitry Kharatyan.

In 2016 Kolya Korobov together with Alexey Vorobyov recorded the song "Ямайка" (Jamaica) with an accompanying video. In 2017 the song was nominated for the award RU.TV in the nomination category of Best Duet. That year, they released a joint song called "Будем танцевать" (We'll Dance).

In 2018, the song "Я попал" (I Got Entangled) was released. Directed by Alexey Vorobyov (iTunes chart in 4th place). That year, the artist released the tracks "I Want To Be the First" and "Найди меня" (Find Me) (iTunes chart in 10th place). The program S.T.A.R.S. GIRLS by Kolya Korobov and Alexey Vorobyov was awarded Best Leader of 2018, by Zhara.

In 2019 the song "Недотрога" (Prude) is released (iTunes chart in 4th place). In April of the same year, he released the video clip "Моя планета", and later released video clips for the songs "Алла" and "Give Me A Reason". In the same year, he released the single "Не отпускай". Also in 2019, he performed on the stage of the State Kremlin Palace at a big evening of the poet Mikhail Andreev, where he performed the song "Мама".

In 2020, Kolya Korobov, with the support of the Ministry of Social Development of the Moscow Region, organized a charity concert in which Victoria Daineko, Group "Фабрика", Quest Pistols Show, ЮрКисс, ВладиМир, ANIVAR, Дэя and others took part. In the same year, he released two tracks called "Моя любовь не спит" and "Девочка моя".

In 2021, he released a video clip for the track "Девочка моя", in the filming of which the PBC CSKA cheerleading team took part. In the same year, he took 1st place in the competition "May 9 - the Day of the Great Victory", which was organized by the autonomous non-profit organization "Scientific and Educational Center for Pedagogical Projects" in honor of the 76th anniversary of the victory in the Great Patriotic War.

Год	Премия	Номинация	Результат	Ист.
2017	Award RU.TV 2017	Best duet	Nominated	
2018	Zhara	Best Leader	Won	
2018	Kinder Muz Awards	Best performer	Nominated	
