= Provostry of St. Nicholas, Passau =

Former canonry in Passau, Bavaria

Coordinates: 48.5705°N 13.4567°E

Provostry of St Nicholas
- Stift Sankt Nikola
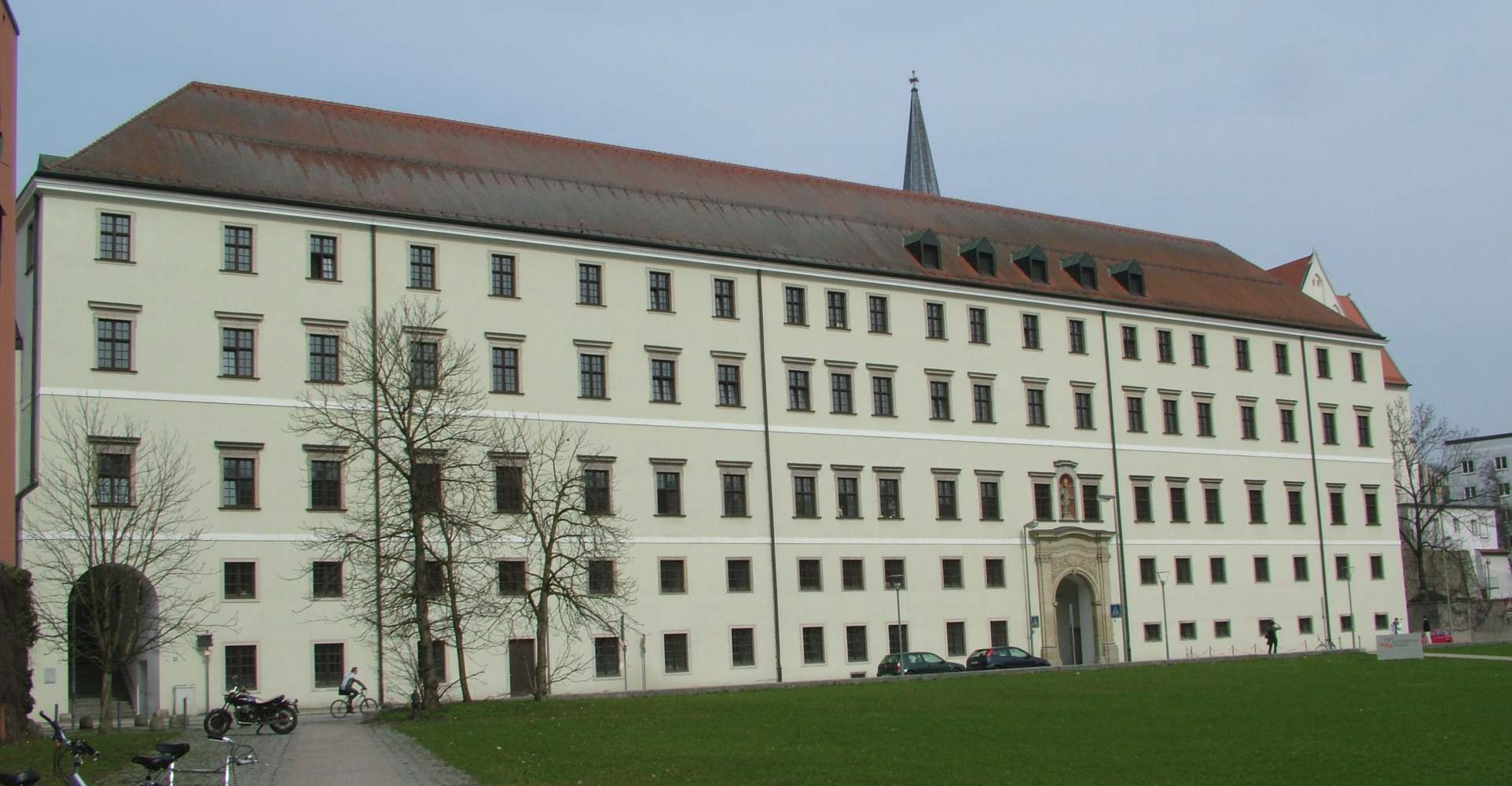
- Interactive map of Provostry of St Nicholas

Monastery information
- Other names: Abbey of St Nicholas, Passau

The Provostry of St Nicholas (German: Stift Sankt Nikola) in Passau, Bavaria, often also referred to as the Abbey of St Nicholas, is a former establishment of the Augustinian Canons (a canonry), founded in about 1070 and dissolved in 1803. After many years of military use, the premises were partly occupied after the end of World War II by the Sisters of the Teutonic Order, later becoming their mother house, and from the 1970s partly by the University of Passau.

== History ==
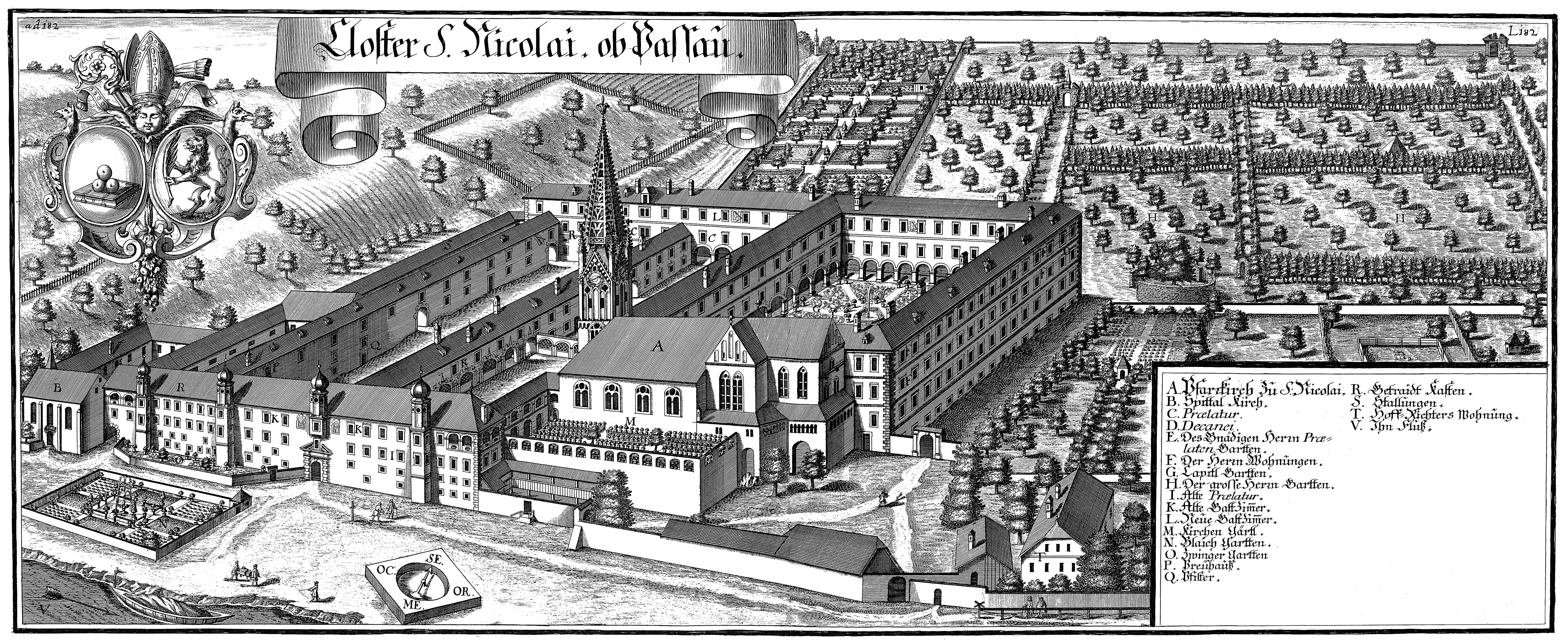
Michael Wening: Stift St. Nikola, early 18th century

The Provostry of St. Nicholas was founded in about 1070 (30 September 1067 according to the foundation document, 3 March 1072 according to the privilege of Pope Alexander II) by Bishop Altmann of Passau, former chaplain to Empress Agnes of Poitou. Shortly after its foundation the community was caught up in the disturbances of the Investiture Controversy and the canons were driven out. In 1111 the canonry seems to have been re-founded, as appears from a deed of Emperor Henry V. In 1248, in consequence of the transfer of the rights of advocacy (Vogteirechte) from the von Vichtenstein family (connected to the Counts of Formbach) to the von Ortenburg family, who were oppressed by the Dukes of Bavaria, the bishops of Passau lost the canonry to the Bavarian dukes.

In the 15th century the life of the community was vulnerable to criticism, as in a visitation by Nicholas of Cusa. In the 16th century St. Nicholas' was gripped by the Reformation: Provost Thomas Gunner converted to Luther's teachings, but was obliged to flee to Austria in 1556. Some years later the Counter-Reformation took hold, as evidenced in the 1581 visitation of the Papal nuncio Feliciano Ninguarda. Provost Claudius Aichel (1666–1683) was granted the right to wear the pontificalia.

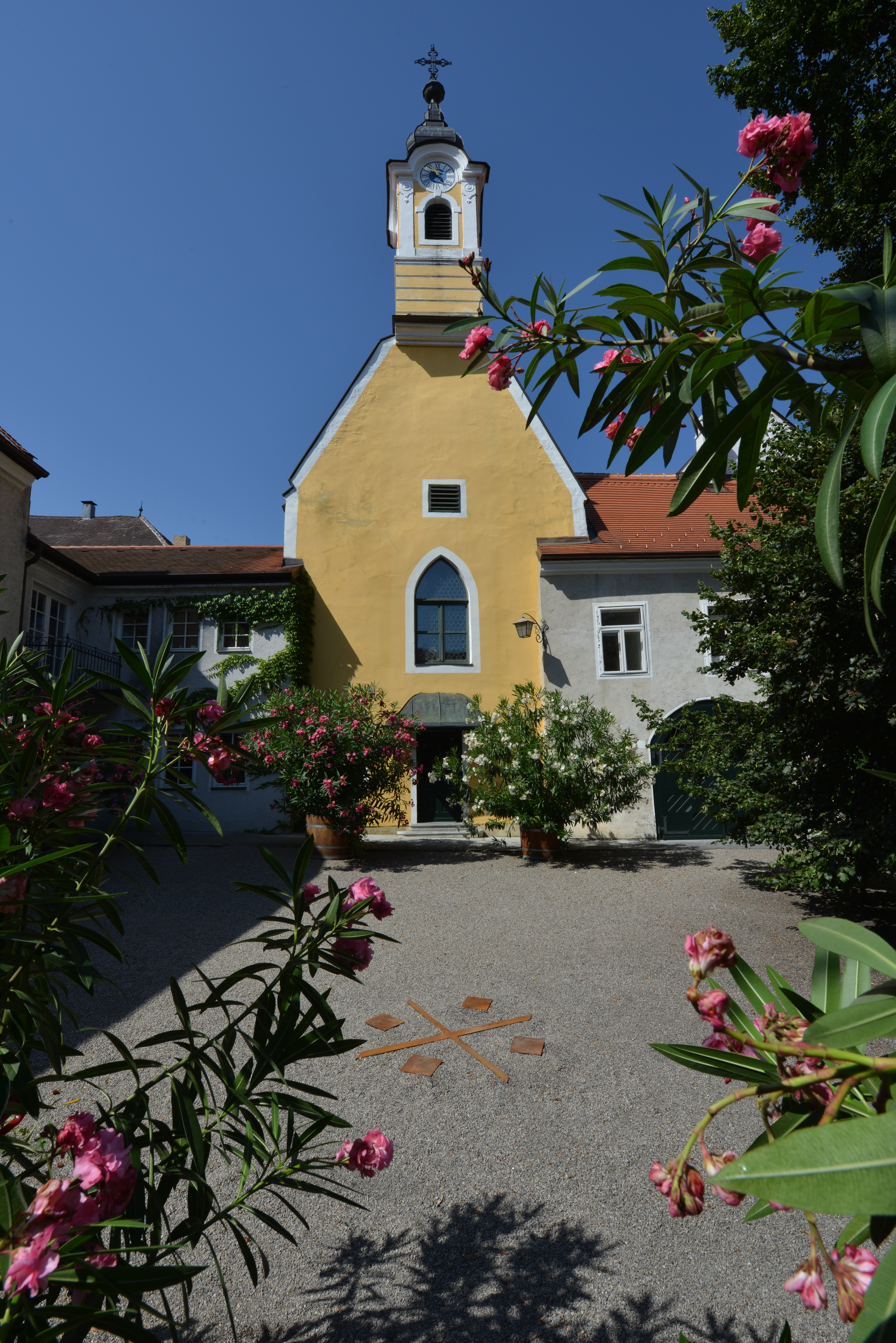
The Nikolaihof in Mautern an der Donau

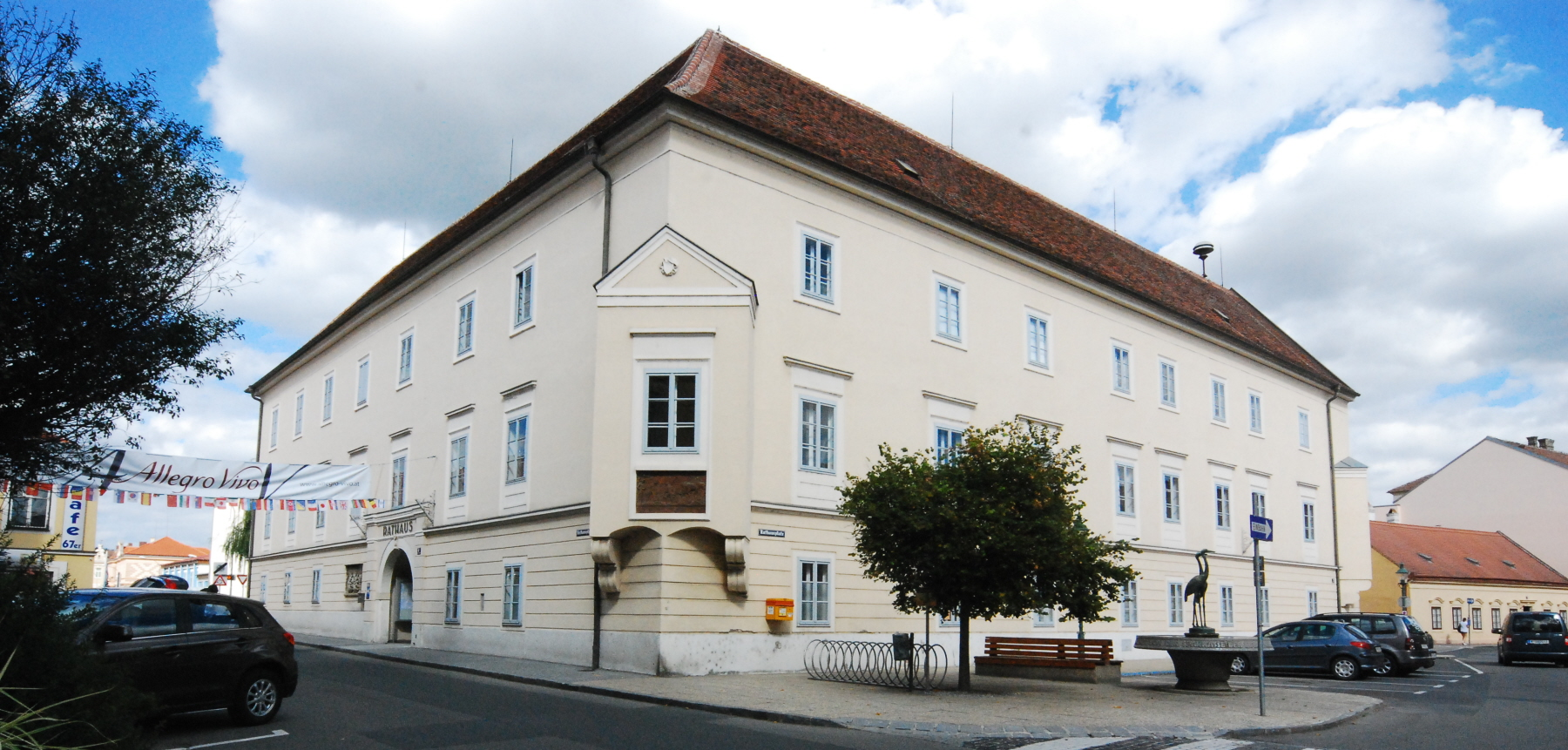
The Turmhof, now the town hall of Horn, Austria

The provostry had responsibility for several parishes: in Bavaria, Aidenbach, Alburg in Straubing, St Petrus in Hartkirchen in Pocking, St Ulrich in Pocking and Mariä Himmelfahrt (Assumption of the Virgin Mary) in Mittich in Neuhaus am Inn; and in Austria, Alkoven, Grieskirchen, Münichreith am Ostrong, Neukirchen am Ostrong in Pöggstall, Bad Wimsbach-Neydharting, Roitham am Traunfall and Pollham. After the dissolution of the provostry these became independent parishes, mostly still ministered to by former canons of St Nicholas'. The Provostry of St Oswald in Sankt Oswald-Riedlhütte was for a relatively short period (1431–1563) administered from St Nicholas' before being given to the Benedictines.

During the Baroque period the provostry provided a base and workshop for several generations of sculptors, including among others Joseph Matthias Götz and Joseph Deutschmann. For a time this was the most important sculpture workshop between Munich and Vienna. The provostry buildings were thoroughly refurbished in 1666 by Carlo Antonio Carlone in the Baroque style around two large courtyards.

== Dissolution ==
In 1803, in the course of secularisation, the provostry was dissolved. At that point there were 40 canons, the last of whom, Isidor Alois Reisinger, died on 8 May 1851 in Kirchdorf bei Haag.

There were no buyers for the premises, which thus remained the property of the town.

The contents of the library were split between the Hofbibliothek in Munich, the library of the then Ludwig-Maximilians-Universität München in Landshut and the libraries of the Gymnasia of Straubing and Passau.

The canonry's four town houses (Freihöfe) in the Habsburg territories - the Nikolaihof in Mautern an der Donau; the former Turmhof in Horn, now the town hall; the Klosterneuburger Hof in Klosterneuburg; and the Freyhof in Aschach an der Donau - were confiscated by the Lower Austrian administration and later sold.

== Church of St Nicholas ==
The original church was destroyed by an earthquake in 1348, leaving only the Romanesque crypt intact. It was rebuilt on the floor plan of the lost original building in the north and east of the site as a late Gothic hall church with a central nave and two side aisles. (The refectory in the same part of the premises later became the chapel of the Sisters of the Teutonic Order). The tower was built over the years from 1410 to 1420.

The existing church of St Nicholas (Klosterkirche St. Nikola) is an underlying Gothic structure overlaid with the appearance of a Baroque hall church with a transept and a choir with a straight end. The appearance of the interior is the result of a Baroque refurbishment of 1716 by Johann Michael Prunner of Linz and Jakob Pawanger, the master mason of the Passau cathedral chapter. The nave has four bays, the choir two, of which the western bay is taken up by an organ loft. Between the nave and the choir is the square crossing. Smooth pilasters (higher in the central nave) with Corinthian capitals painted pink are used as facings for the freestanding pillars. The pillars in the crossing are reinforced and bevelled by double pilasters. The vaults throughout the whole interior are Baroque: the nave, arms of the transept and choir are covered by barrel vaults, the side aisles by sail domes (Hängekuppeln) and the chapels by transverse barrel vaults. The crossing is covered by a single shallow dome. The heights of the tops of the arches in the nave, transept arms and choir are about the same, but lower in the aisles.

The stucco work was created by Giovanni Battista d’Allio. The frescoes are by Wolfgang Andreas Heindl from Wels. On the ceiling of each bay of the nave is a group of three ceiling paintings on the theme of the life of Saint Nicholas. In the dome over the crossing the Assumption of the Virgin Mary is depicted. The two frescoes in the choir show the Miracle of Pentecost and the Adoration of the Lamb of the Apocalypse.

After the secularisation of 1803 and the abolition of the parish of St Nicholas on 21 March of that year, the Baroque furnishings of the church including the altars were sold to the town parish church of St John the Baptist in Vilshofen an der Donau, where they remain.

The town parish of St Nicholas was revived in 1959. The former canons' church serves as the parish church and also the university church. Its furnishings are mostly modern, with works by Wolf Hirtreiter, but also with Gothic paintings and Baroque figures. The tower, which was demolished in 1815 because of its dilapidation, was restored in 1990-1993.

The Romanesque crypt of the late 11th century under the choir was restored from 1974 to 1979. It has Gothic frescoes of the 14th century and a Gothic sandstone Madonna, a former Gnadenbild (miracle-working image). The altar and the tabernacle by Leopold Hafner are modern.

== Later use ==
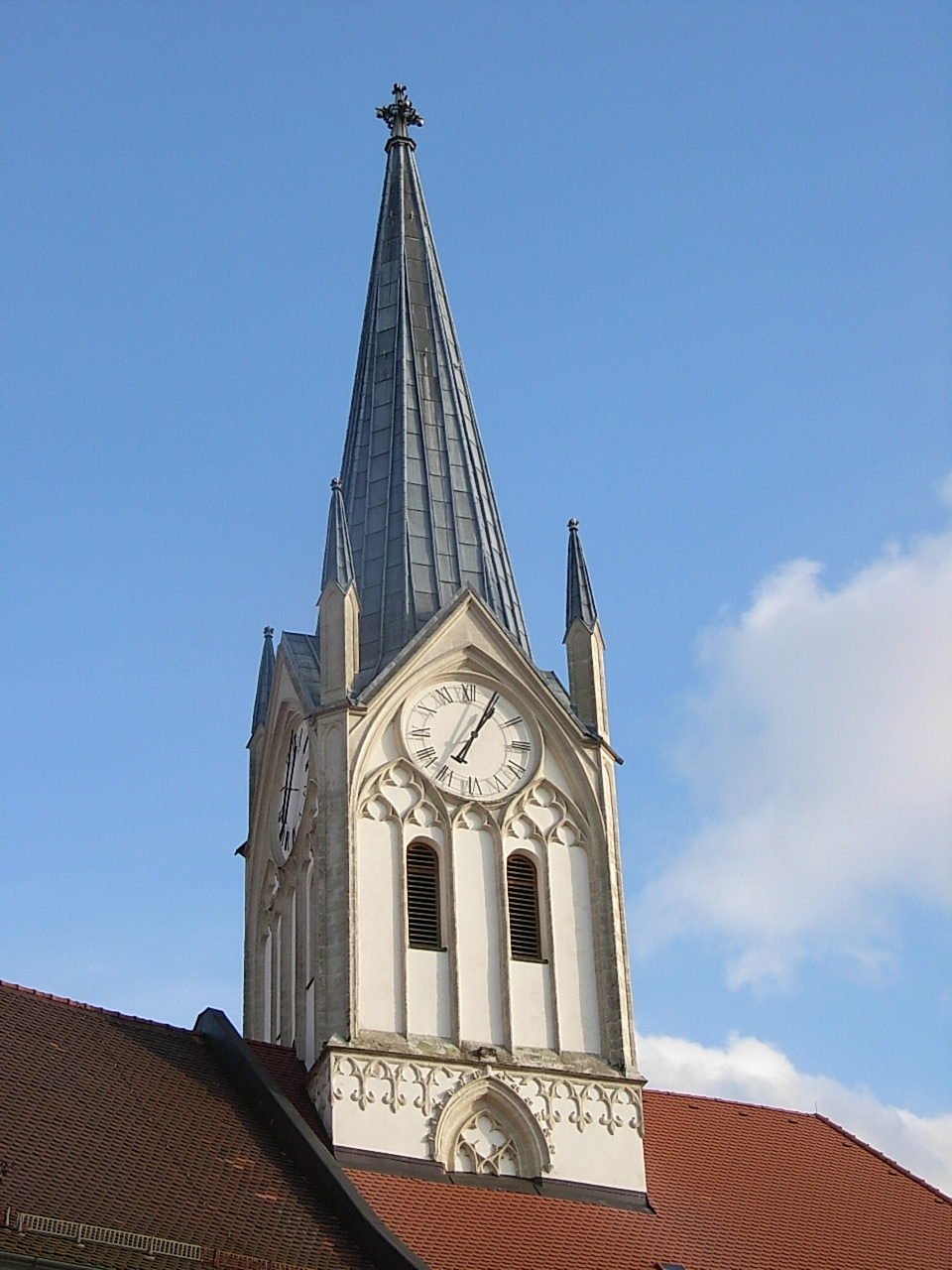
The restored church tower

In 1806 the former provostry was taken over by Napoleon as a military hospital. From 1809 to 1945 it was used as a barracks, known as the Nikolai-Kaserne until 1938, when it was renamed the Somme-Kaserne. The former canons' garden opposite was repurposed as a drill ground, and retains the name (der) Kleine Exerzierplatz. The church was used as a storage space for military equipment.

After World War II the building complex was used as a refugee camp and later as a special academy for social pedagogy (Sozialpädagogik). In 1972 the University of Passau moved into the south and west wings. The north and east wings accommodate the provincial headquarters of the Sisters of the Teutonic Order, who maintain a special school, a kindergarten and an old people's home.

The town parish of St Nicholas was revived in 1959. The former canons' church serves as the parish church and also the university church. Its furnishings are mostly modern, with works by Wolf Hirtreiter, but also with Gothic paintings and Baroque figures. The tower, which was demolished in 1815 because of its dilapidation, was restored in 1990-1993.
