= Nicola tetela =

Scientific classification
- Kingdom: Animalia
- Phylum: Porifera
- Class: Calcarea
- Order: Clathrinida
- Family: Clathrinidae
- Genus: Nicola; Condor-Lujan & Klautau, 2016
- Species: N. tetela

Binomial name
- Nicola tetela (Borojevic & Peixinho, 1976)

Synonyms
- Guancha tetela Borojevic & Peixinho, 1976

Species of sponge

Nicola is a genus of calcareous sponge, comprising a single species, Nicola tetela.
