= Nicholas, Virginia =

Unincorporated community in Virginia, United States

Coordinates: 37°45′58″N 78°28′02″W

Nicholas is an unincorporated community in Fluvanna County, in the U.S. state of Virginia. Nicholas is 266 feet above sea level.
