= Tropical Storm Nicole (2010) =

Atlantic tropical cyclone

- Tropical Storm Nicole near Cuba on September 29

Meteorological history
- Formed: September 28, 2010
- Extratropical: September 29
- Dissipated: September 30, 2010

Tropical storm
- 1-minute sustained (SSHWS/NWS)
- Highest winds: 45 mph (75 km/h)
- Lowest pressure: 995 mbar (hPa); 29.38 inHg

Overall effects
- Fatalities: 16 total
- Damage: $245 million (2010 USD)
- Areas affected: Cayman Islands, Jamaica, Cuba, Florida, Bahamas, United States East Coast
- IBTrACS /
- Part of the 2010 Atlantic hurricane season

Tropical Storm Nicole was a short-lived and unusually asymmetrical tropical cyclone that caused destructive rainfall and flooding in Jamaica during the 2010 Atlantic hurricane season. It was the sixteenth tropical cyclone and the fourteenth named storm of the season, as well as the last of eight tropical storms to form in September. Originating from a broad monsoonal low, Nicole became a tropical depression over the northwestern Caribbean Sea on September 28. It maintained an unusual structure as it tracked northeastward, with a poorly defined wind circulation and few thunderstorms near its center. Nicole approached the coast of Cuba as a weak tropical storm, losing its status as a tropical cyclone over the territory on September 29. The remnants emerged over the Bahamas and eventually became absorbed by a separate extratropical system.

Due to Nicole's atypical structure, the strongest convection was well removed from the center; most of the weather activity occurred over the north-central Caribbean. In Jamaica, the storm triggered widespread power outages across more than 288,000 residences. Extreme precipitation of up to 37.42 inches (950 mm) caused disastrous flooding in several parishes, severely damaging or destroying 528 houses. The devastation extended to the island's farmland and environment, which suffered from expansive water pollution. In all, Nicole wrought an estimated $245.4 million (2010 USD) in damage throughout Jamaica, and there were sixteen fatalities. Elsewhere, minor flooding occurred in Cuba, Florida, and the Cayman Islands. The remnants of the storm contributed to a large disturbance along the East Coast of the United States, causing additional damage and deaths.

== Meteorological history ==
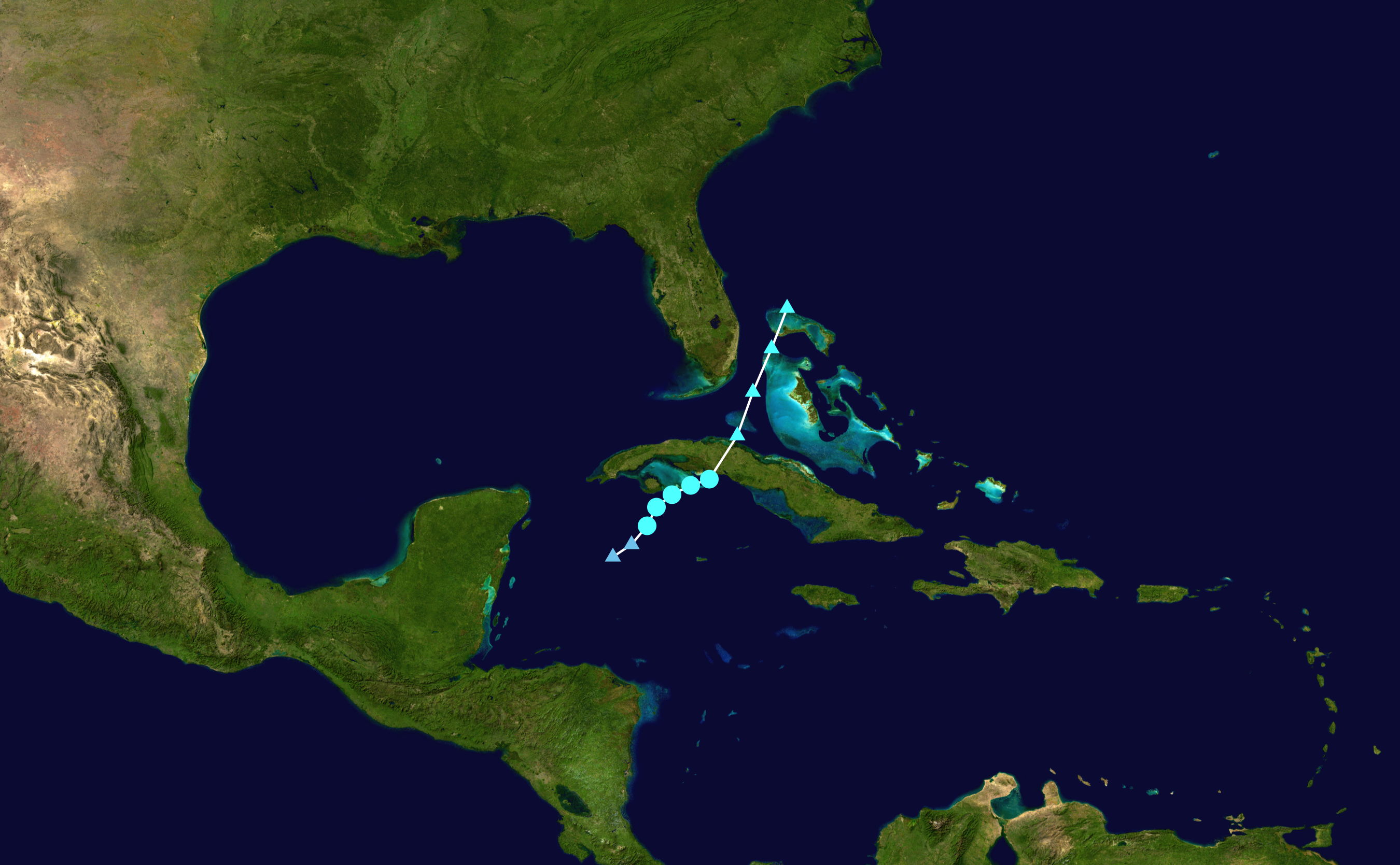
Map plotting the storm's track and intensity, according to the Saffir–Simpson scale Map key Saffir–Simpson scale Tropical depression (≤38 mph, ≤62 km/h) Tropical storm (39–73 mph, 63–118 km/h) Category 1 (74–95 mph, 119–153 km/h) Category 2 (96–110 mph, 154–177 km/h) Category 3 (111–129 mph, 178–208 km/h) Category 4 (130–156 mph, 209–251 km/h) Category 5 (≥157 mph, ≥252 km/h) Unknown Storm type Tropical cyclone Subtropical cyclone Extratropical cyclone, remnant low, tropical disturbance, or monsoon depression

In late September 2010, a wide band of disturbed weather and low pressure, associated with the monsoon trough and remnant tropical moisture from Tropical Storm Matthew, meandered over the northwestern Caribbean Sea. With a broad upper ridge anchored along the Yucatán coast, diffluence aloft in the vicinity of the disturbance provided focus for the development of scattered convection. The National Hurricane Center (NHC) noted an environment supportive of tropical development, and by September 27, a broad surface low formed amid the convection. The next day, surface pressures steadily dropped as sustained winds around the low proximated tropical storm force. Throughout the development process, moderate westerly wind shear over the region caused the disturbance to exhibit a rather asymmetric structure; it developed an elongated low-pressure center by September 28, well to the northwest of its strongest wind field. Despite the asymmetry, the NHC initiated advisories on a tropical depression around 15:00 UTC that day, after surface and satellite observations revealed a sufficiently defined circulation center west of the deep convection. Post-season reassessments, however, indicated that a tropical storm had, in fact, formed three hours earlier, about 75 miles (120 km) south of Cuba's Isle of Youth, which operationally was not named Nicole until a day later.

The center of Nicole near Cuba, with the greatest rain volumes to the southeast over Jamaica as depicted on water vapor imagery

For most of its duration, Nicole maintained a generally northeastward motion, caught in the steering flow between a large mid- to upper-level trough and an anticyclone to the west. Within hours of the storm's formation, observations from a hurricane hunters flight confirmed a composition similar to the one initially discerned, with the strongest gusts and thunderstorms dislocated 250 mi (400 km) east from the ill-defined center. In comparison, the core consisted of light winds and sporadic convection—a structure rather characteristic of a North Indian Ocean monsoon depression. The system's ambiguous nature led to disagreement among weather specialists over its classification: while the NHC maintained its tropical cyclone status, Cuban meteorologist José Rubiera stated that "no tropical storm exists over [Cuba], or near it," noting a lack of significant winds in the country's vicinity.

Over the course of September 29, radar data showed the convection increasing over the northern half of the storm; bands of intense thunderstorms in the southeastern periphery also formed closer to the center, and weather buoys and ships in that region observed sustained tropical-storm-force winds. Around 12:00 UTC, Nicole attained an estimated peak intensity of 45 miles per hour (72 km/h) winds and a minimum pressure of 995 mbar (29.4 inHg), just south of Cuba. Despite the increase in strength, Nicole's circulation soon became exceedingly elongated and untrackable over central Cuba, prompting the NHC to declassify it as a tropical cyclone by 15:00 UTC. The remnant low began interacting with the neighboring trough that had steered Nicole in its tropical stages, resulting in significant precipitation along the southeastern coastlines of the United States. Accelerating toward the northeast, the system acquired frontal characteristics and became extratropical over the Bahamas by 0600 UTC, September 30, twelve hours before merging with a developing system over eastern North Carolina. Lingering low pressure and broad cyclonic flow over the north-central Caribbean in Nicole's wake contributed to the development of Hurricane Paula in the first weeks of October.

== Preparations ==
=== Caribbean ===
In anticipation of a tropical storm, warnings were issued for the Cayman Islands, the northwestern and central Bahamas, and the Cuban provinces of Matanzas, Cienfuegos, Villa Clara, Sancti Spíritus, and Ciego de Ávila on September 28. However, the warnings were discontinued the following day after reports of the storm's prompt dissipation. After forecasters warned of severe weather across the Cayman Islands, schools and government offices closed in low-lying areas, and emergency teams cleaned out storm drains and readied shelters. Thunderstorms in Grand Cayman forced Cayman Airways to cancel all express flights to Cayman Brac and Little Cayman on October 29; weather-resistant jet service was provided to stranded passengers. A marine warning was required for all three islands due to rough sea conditions.

In Jamaica, a flash flood warning remained in effect for flood-prone regions for four days, ultimately discontinued on October 3. Schools and several businesses, including the US Embassy in Kingston, closed on September 29–30 as the island braced for heavy rains. Public transit was suspended islandwide on the evening of September 29, and shipping interests were cautioned to secure their vessels. At the height of the storm, army and police officials patrolled the island in case of emergencies.

=== United States ===
The remnants of Nicole approaching South Carolina on September 30

Tropical storm warnings were issued for the Florida Keys, the Florida Bay, and from the Jupiter Inlet coast southward to Cape Sable on September 28. A tropical storm watch was in place for the mainland north from the Jupiter Inlet to the Sebastian Inlet and north of East Cape Sable to Chokoloskee. The warnings and watch were discontinued the next day, after a direct impact was no longer expected. At the time, a flood watch remained in effect for Palm Beach, Broward, Miami-Dade, Collier, and Monroe counties into September 30. An airport weather warning was issued for Orlando International Airport and Executive Airport on September 28; arriving flights were put on hold, and pilots rerouted to other airports if possible. Eight Southwest Airlines flights were diverted to the airports of Tampa and Jacksonville, and one JetBlue flight to West Palm Beach. Though airport officials later reported normal conditions, an additional 26 flights were canceled at Miami International Airport the next day. The National Hockey League postponed a preseason game by the Florida Panthers.

In Brunswick and New Hanover counties, North Carolina, officials readied shelters on September 29 to accommodate stranded residents unable to access their homes. Multiple schools in New Hanover and Pender County remained closed the next morning due to worsening storm conditions from the disturbance succeeding Nicole. At the threat of prolonged rainfall, a flood watch was issued for Kent County, Maryland, from September 30 to October 1. Also in the area, the National Weather Service declared both a coastal flood advisory and wind advisory for September 30.

== Impact ==
=== Jamaica ===
Nicole over Jamaica, Cuba and the Bahamas on September 29

Nicole and its precursor disturbance brought great rainfall to much of Jamaica over a period of several days. A maximum total of 37.42 inches (950 mm) was recorded in Belleisle, Westmoreland Parish, from September 26 to 30; most other parishes received at least 12 inches (300 mm) during the same period. With a return period of 30 years, these quantities tripled the monthly rainfall average for September at several locations. Though the broad-scale wind regime over the island remained gentle, the storm's intense convective bands produced three microbursts—small downdrafts of intense winds. With dozens of river banks and waterways blocked, the worst effects were due to landslides and particularly severe flooding across numerous communities, primarily in the southern parishes.

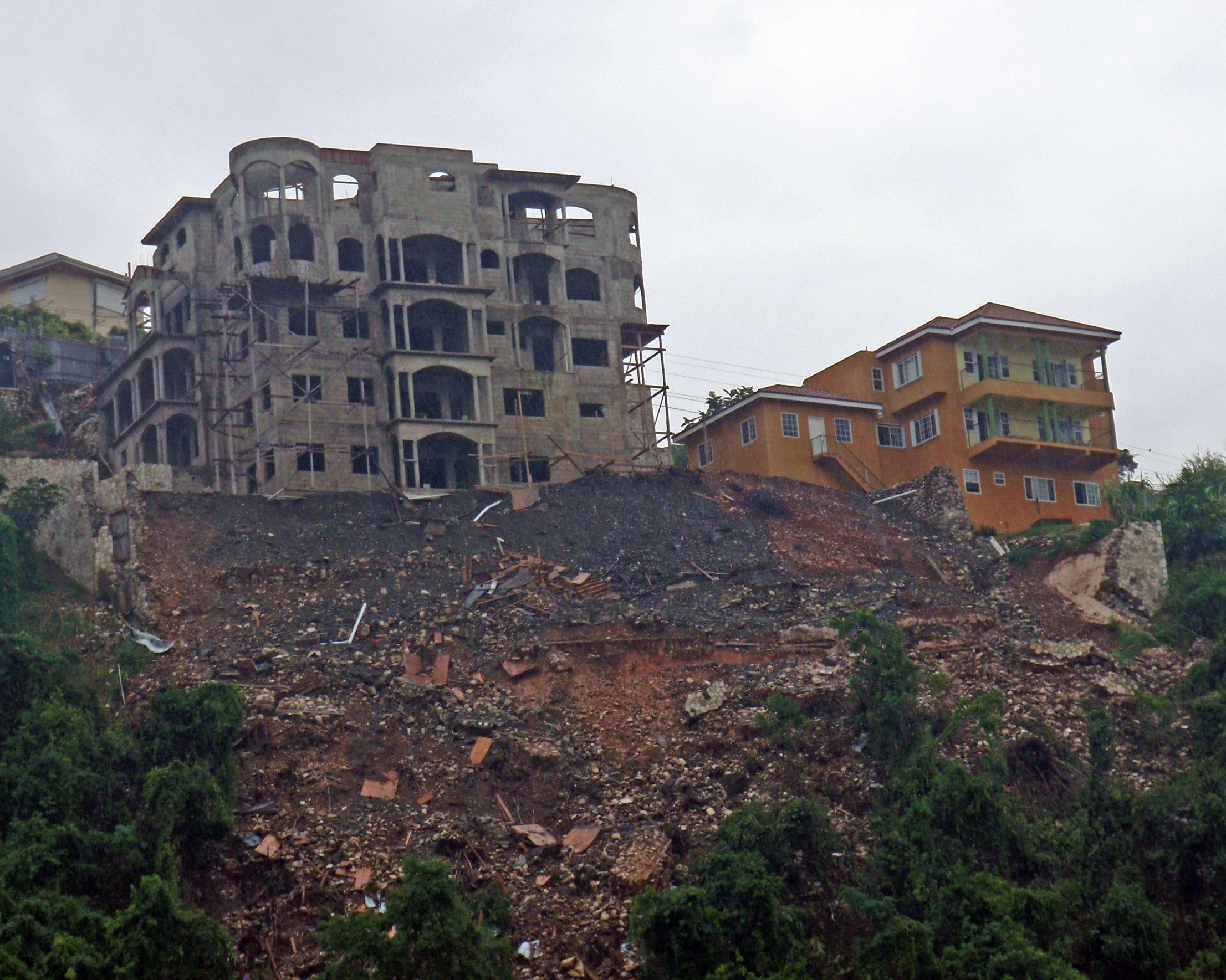
A shed collapsed in Saint Andrew Parish, killing the three construction workers inside

The disaster affected 507,831 people on the island; it resulted in 16 deaths—14 confirmed—and 42 injuries. In Saint Andrew Parish's Sandy Park, a house next to a street gully succumbed to the effects of the storm; five bodies were recovered near the site, while the final missing inhabitant was presumed dead. Elsewhere in Saint Andrew, three construction workers were killed when the shed in which they were sleeping collapsed. A girl was crushed to death under the weight of a collapsed board house in Saint Catherine Parish. Rushing waters swept away three people in different parts of the island. Amid a microburst, a waterspout tore roofs off buildings and hospitalized five residents in Westmoreland Parish's capital of Savanna-la-Mar, while to the northwest, strong gusts and rough surf impacted the resort town of Negril. In the wake of the storm, a body was recovered from debris along a road in Saint Catherine. Flooded streets, roads, and bridges isolated communities across seven of the island's parishes and trapped hundreds of residents in their homes.

Jamaica's infrastructure was devastated in the deluge, accounting for most of Nicole's damage to the island. More than 288,000 residences were without power at the height of the storm due to downed electricity lines and poles. About 40 percent of the island's water supply had been disrupted at some point. Dozens of bridges experienced total collapse under the force of swollen rivers and creeks. In Kingston, many underpasses became totally inundated as the prolonged rain overwhelmed storm drains; the flooding that followed left many of the city's roads impassable. Destruction to the infrastructure was especially extensive in Westmoreland, Saint Elizabeth, and Hanover parishes, though overall, 543 of the island's principle roads sustained at least some degree of damage. The total costs linked to the infrastructure neared J$20 billion (US$235.4 million).

Nicole also wreaked widespread property damage: of the 2,169 homes affected, 474 sustained severe damage while 54 were beyond repair. The losses totaled J$274.3 million (US$3.2 million), J$75.6 million (US$890,000) hereof to replace destroyed housing units. With much of the island's crops and livestock washed away, including 40 percent of the season's banana produce, the agricultural sector suffered J$576.5 million (US$6.8 million) in losses. The storm had a discernible impact on the environment, which plays a crucial role in Jamaica's economy and tourism sectors. Surface runoff and spills along industrial zones and sewage systems infiltrated large stretches of land, leading to soil contamination, coastal erosion, and deteriorated ecosystems. In addition, there were traces of light damage to vegetation, such as uprooted trees.

=== Elsewhere ===
While Nicole was intensifying offshore, its outer bands produced heavy downpours over drought-stricken Cuba. Rain quantities were particularly high along the southeastern coast: a 48-hour total of 9.22 inches (234 mm) fell at Cape Cruz, in the mountainous Granma Province. The region also briefly observed gale-force winds, with gusts to 53 miles per hour (85 km/h) at Guantánamo Bay. Throughout eastern Cuba, nearly 300 people sought refuge from the storm. As the rivers in Granma overflowed, eight houses collapsed and more than 300 others were inundated in the coastal town of Pilón. The flooding obstructed several roads, with sections of the highway between Granma and Santiago de Cuba destroyed. The storm resulted in 5,000 lbs (2.5 tons) of lost crops and livestock. These effects were nevertheless considered to be minor when viewed against the rainfall's alleviation of a persistent dry spell.

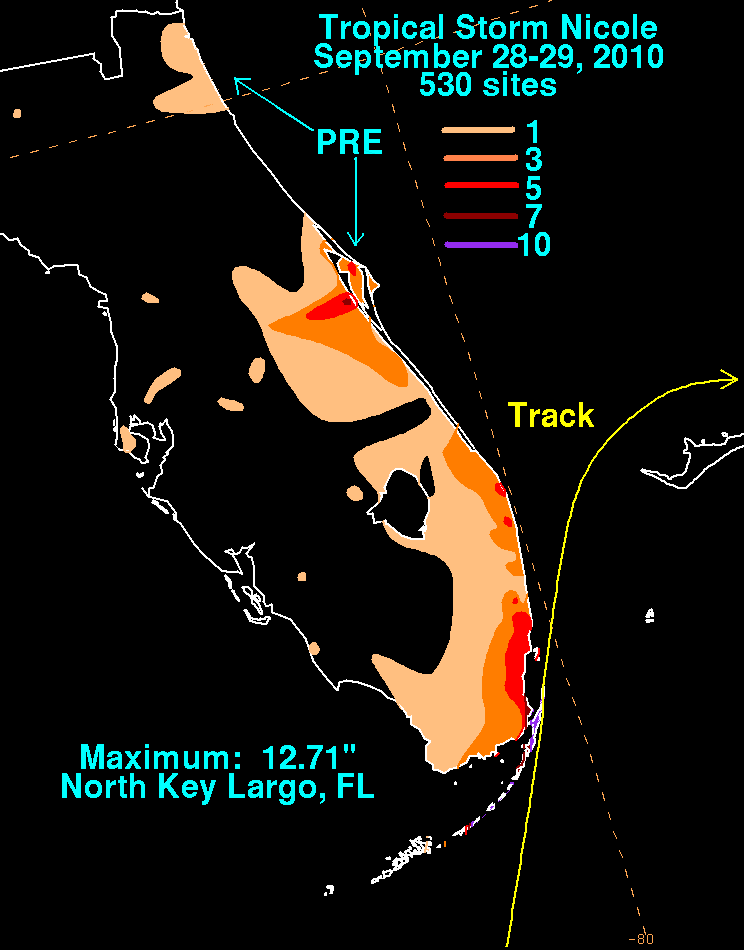
Rainfall from Tropical Storm Nicole in Florida

In the Cayman Islands, gusts to 51 miles per hour (82 km/h) stirred up rough seas with 8–10-foot (2.4–3.0 m) waves, which caused some light erosion along southern and western shores. Rainfall over the region was heavy and widespread, although the greatest quantities fell over Grand Cayman; the Owen Roberts International Airport recorded 9.02 inches (229 mm) over a two-day period. Overall damage to the islands was limited: The blustery rains flooded low-lying areas, caused roof leaks, and knocked out the power in eastern Grand Cayman.

Despite the initial threat of strong thunderstorms and gusts, Florida was spared a direct hit from Nicole. The storm skirted the state with only showers: 12.71 inches (323 mm) of rain fell at North Key Largo, though the mainland received much smaller quantities. The storm flooded streets in Miami Beach and the northern Florida Keys, as well as one home. Similarly, inclement weather spread over the northwestern Bahamas without significant consequences.

=== Post-tropical system ===
The extratropical remnants of Nicole retained plenty of moisture and ultimately combined with a large low-pressure system slowly tracking up the U.S. East Coast. The resultant disturbance produced torrential thunderstorms over entire coastlines and inland as far north as Canada, causing widespread power outages and shattering numerous precipitation records throughout the region. The most extreme weather was concentrated over Eastern North Carolina; during the week of September 24–October 1, most communities there recorded rainfall totals of at least 8–10 inches (200–250 mm). Wilmington measured 22.54 inches (573 mm) of rain, the most it had received over a five-day period since 1871, while Kinston recorded 15 inches (380 mm) during that time. Widespread flooding, exacerbated by overflowing creeks and rivers, engulfed blocks of homes. About 150 roads were closed off due to the hazardous conditions; seven people were nonetheless killed in traffic accidents across the state.

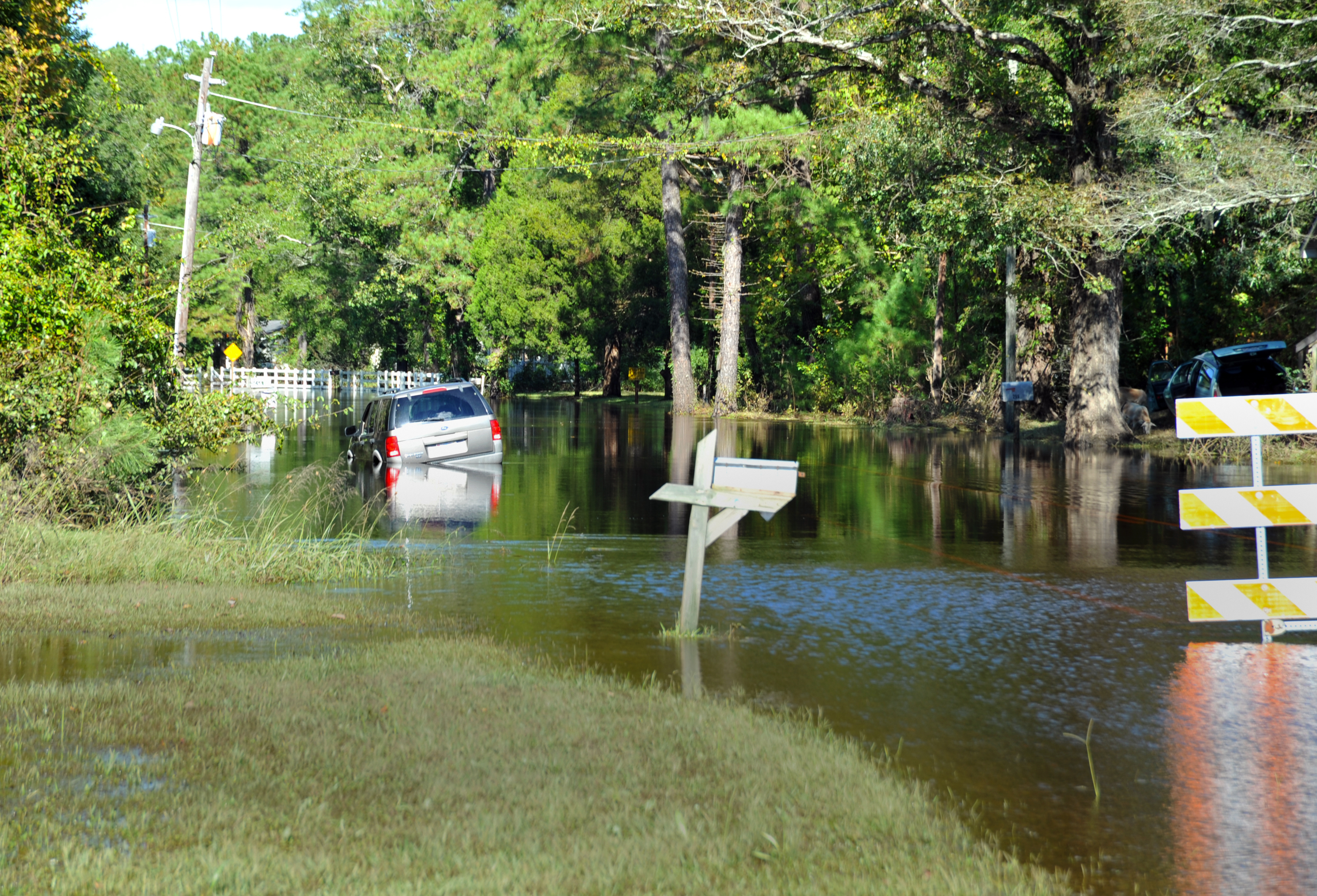
Flooding from the post-tropical system in Vanceboro, North Carolina

In the Mid-Atlantic, the weather event broke the 24-hour rainfall record for September 30 at several locations: the Norfolk, Baltimore–Washington, and Ronald Reagan Washington airports recorded 7.85 inches (199 mm), 6.02 inches (153 mm), and 4.66 inches (118 mm), respectively. In Maryland, two buses collided amid the stormy weather, injuring 26 of their passengers. In the states of Pennsylvania and New Jersey, all access to the Delaware River in the Delaware Water Gap National Recreation Area was blocked off. With localized estimates of up to 8 inches (200 mm), the state of New York experienced some of its most historic rainfall; an official total 4.24 inches (108 mm) shattered the 24-hour record for any calendar day in Binghamtom. Flash floods throughout the state resulted in one drowning death and US$10,000 in damage. Considerable flooding also occurred in Vermont and Pennsylvania, with a 24-hour rainfall maximum of 10.5 inches (270 mm) in Moscow. Farther north, the remnant low enhanced a pressure gradient over southern New England, generating strong winds that knocked out the power in Litchfield County. Rainfall there additionally caused minor flooding. In Quebec, torrents following 3.5 inches (89 mm) of rainfall inundated basements and caused two drownings. Despite the deaths and damage, the rains lightened prolonged drought conditions in those regions.

== Aftermath ==
On October 5, a national disaster was declared for Jamaica due to the effects of Nicole. In response, the USAID's Office of Foreign Disaster Assistance provided US$50,000 for the purchase and delivery of relief supplies and fuel for emergency vehicles. About J$4 million (US$46,800) was donated by the Ministry of Agriculture and Fisheries to the Greenhouse Growers Association for the repair of greenhouses. In conjunction with the Food and Agriculture Organization, an estimated J$12 million (US$140,400) was made available to initiate the planting of about 50,000 crop seedlings. The Veterinary Division provided financial assistance to livestock farmers and dispatched animal technicians with prophylactic medication and vitamins to avert foot rot disease in small ruminants, including goats and sheep. The cost of the medications was estimated at J$2 million (US$23,400). The Banana Board's Catastrophe Fund, which at the time comprised J$50 million (US$585,000), delivered both monetary support and human resources to local banana and plantain farmers.

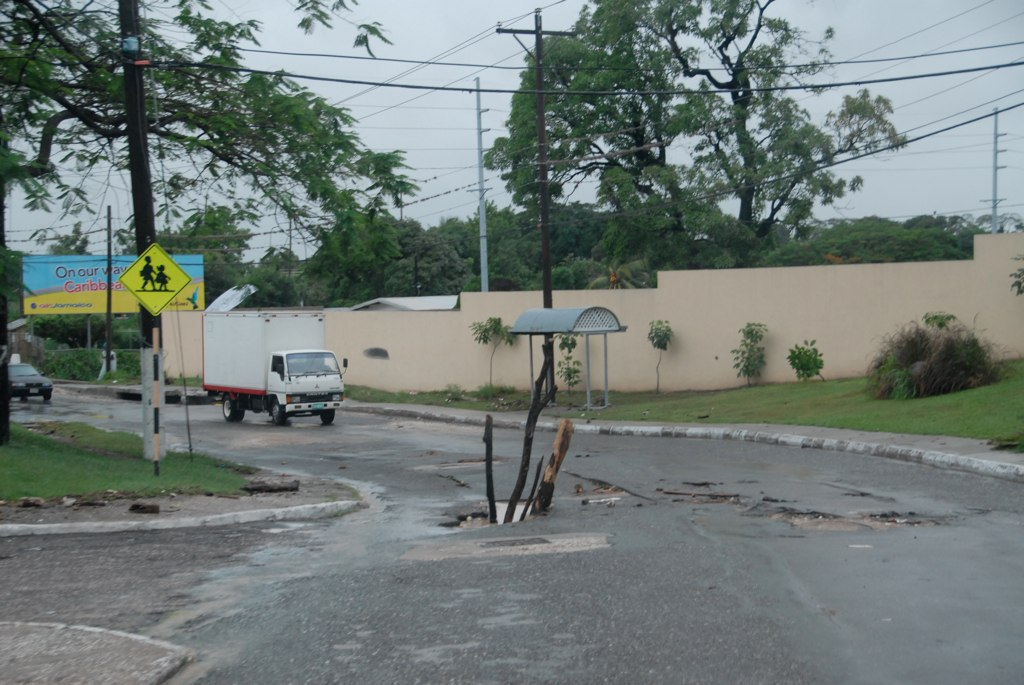
Road damage in Nicole's wake was widespread across Jamaica.

Eleven days after the storm, the International Federation of Red Cross and Red Crescent Societies allocated CHF150,644 (US$156,221) to sustain the Jamaica Red Cross in distributing aid to about 500 families—or 2,500 beneficiaries—in need of life supplies. In late December 2010, the Jamaica–Canadian Association in Toronto, Ontario, raised a total of CDN$10,153.87 (US$10,221.33) in relief funds for flood victims. The Hanover Parish Council requested J$30 million (US$351,000) to assist the Saint James Parish Council and other municipal authorities across the country in post-storm clean-up and beautification work. A grant of J$279 million (US$3.26 million) was approved for the reconstruction of a major roadway section in Westmoreland Parish.

In spite of the timely relief efforts, Nicole's effects were still felt for months in its wake. The gross domestic product for Jamaica, which had been suffering from a substantially slow economic growth rate, further declined following the extensive damage. The agriculture sector sustained slight losses from reduced egg production due to the storm's traumatizing effects on farm chickens. In the face of the high repair costs, the island saw below-standard levels of holiday season consumption for 2010.

== See also ==
- Tropical cyclones in 2010
- Other storms of the same name
- Timeline of the 2010 Atlantic hurricane season
- Monsoon trough
