= Tignor, Virginia =

Unincorporated community in Virginia, United States

Coordinates: 37°58′33″N 77°06′27″W

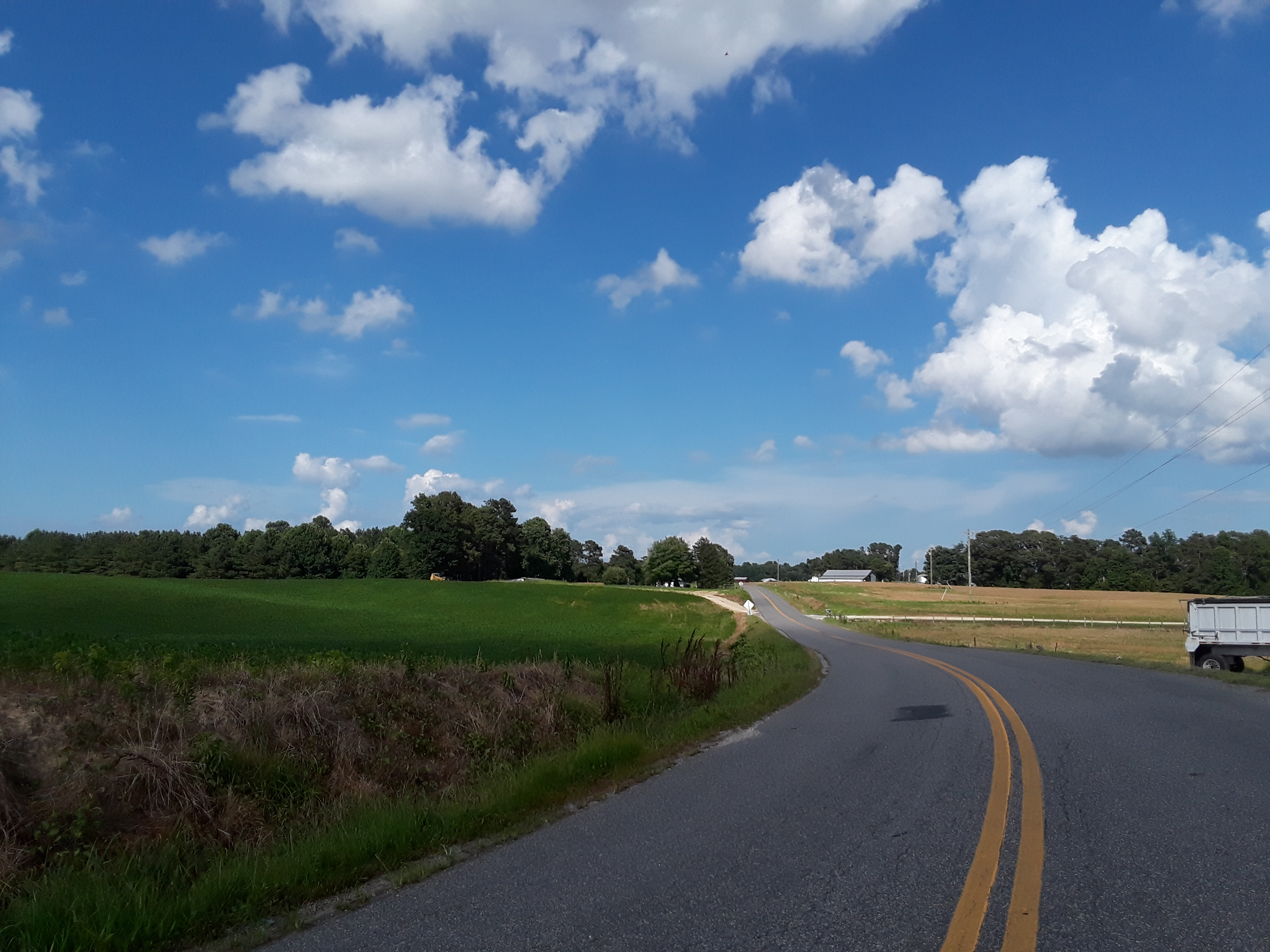
Fields in Tignor

Tignor is an unincorporated community in Caroline County, in the U.S. state of Virginia. The main highway leading into it is State Route 630. The community is at the intersection of Sparta and Tignor Roads.

Tignor had its own U.S. Post Office until the late 1960s, at which time it was then added as a Rural Route to the Milford, Virginia Post Office. The United States Postal Service assigned the Tignor zip code as 23162. After the Tignor Post Office was closed, the zip code remained unused for a number of years but was later assigned as the zip code for Studley, Virginia as the population in that area grew.
