= MV Nicola =

A number of motor vessels have been named Nicola, including:

- MV Nicola (1960), a Canadian ferry
- MV Nicola (2000), a Dutch cargo ship which ran aground on the wreck of MV Tricolor in November 2002
