= Saint Nicolas =

Saint Nicolas may refer to:

== Places ==
=== In Belgium ===
- Saint-Nicolas, Liège, in the Province of Liège
- Sint-Niklaas, in the Province of East Flanders

=== In Canada ===
- Saint-Nicolas, Quebec

=== In France ===
- Saint-Nicolas, Pas-de-Calais
- Saint-Nicolas-aux-Bois, in the Aisne département
- Saint-Nicolas-d'Aliermont, in the Seine-Maritime département
- Saint-Nicolas-d'Attez, in the Eure département
- Saint-Nicolas-de-Bliquetuit, in the Seine-Maritime département
- Saint-Nicolas-de-Bourgueil, in the Indre-et-Loire département
- Saint-Nicolas-de-la-Balerme, in the Lot-et-Garonne département
- Saint-Nicolas-de-la-Grave, in the Tarn département
- Saint-Nicolas-de-la-Haie, in the Seine-Maritime département
- Saint-Nicolas-de-la-Taille, in the Seine-Maritime département
- Saint-Nicolas-de-Macherin, in the Isère département
- Saint-Nicolas-de-Pierrepont, in the Manche département
- Saint-Nicolas-de-Port, in the Meurthe-et-Moselle département
- Saint-Nicolas-de-Redon, in the Loire-Atlantique département
- Saint-Nicolas-des-Biefs, in the Allier département
- Saint-Nicolas-des-Bois, Manche, in the Manche département
- Saint-Nicolas-des-Bois, Orne, in the Orne département
- Saint-Nicolas-des-Laitiers, in the Orne département
- Saint-Nicolas-des-Motets, in the Indre-et-Loire département
- Saint-Nicolas-de-Sommaire, in the Orne département
- Saint-Nicolas-du-Bosc, in the Eure département
- Saint-Nicolas-du-Pélem, in the Côtes-d'Armor département
- Saint-Nicolas-du-Tertre, in the Morbihan département
- Saint-Nicolas-la-Chapelle, Aube, in the Aube département
- Saint-Nicolas-la-Chapelle, Savoie, in the Savoie département
- Saint-Nicolas-lès-Cîteaux, in the Côte-d'Or département

==== Former communes ====
- Saint-Nicolas-Courbefy, a former commune of the Aisne département, now a part of Bussière-Galant
- Saint-Nicolas-de-Brem, a former commune of the Vendée département, now a part of Brem-sur-Mer
- Saint-Nicolas-de-Coutances, a former commune of the Manche département, now a part of Coutances
- Saint-Nicolas-de-Véroce, a former commune of the Haute-Savoie département, now a part of Saint-Gervais-les-Bains
- Saint-Nicolas-du-Bosc-l'Abbé, a former commune of the Eure département, now part of Caorches-Saint-Nicolas
- Saint-Nicolas-en-Forêt, a former commune of the Moselle département, now part of Hayanve
- Saint-Nicolas-près-Granville, a former commune in the Manche département, now part of Granville

=== In Italy ===
- Saint-Nicolas, Aosta Valley

== Music ==
- Saint Nicolas (Britten), a cantata by Benjamin Britten

== See also ==
- Saint Nicholas (disambiguation)
