= List of storms named Nicole =

The name Nicole has been used for four tropical cyclones and one subtropical cyclone in the Atlantic Ocean:

- Hurricane Nicole (1998) – Category 1 hurricane that never approached land
- Subtropical Storm Nicole (2004) – formed near Bermuda and headed toward Nova Scotia, the first subtropical cyclone to receive a name from the standard naming lists that did not become tropical
- Tropical Storm Nicole (2010) – caused destructive rainfall and flooding in Jamaica
- Hurricane Nicole (2016) – Category 4 hurricane that impacted Bermuda
- Hurricane Nicole (2022) – Category 1 hurricane which made landfall in The Bahamas and Florida

A variation of the name, Nichole, was used once in the western north Pacific Ocean:

- Tropical Storm Nichole (1998) (T9801, 02W) – the latest first named storm ever in the Western Pacific
