= Nicky (disambiguation) =

Nicky is a given name, a first name that is frequently a diminutive of Nicole and Nicholas and their variants.

Nicky or variation, may also refer to:

- Nicky (wrestler), stagename of a U.S. pro-wrestler
- "Nicky" video game series
  - Nicky (game engine recreation), a 2006 re-release of 1992 videogame Nicky Boom
  - Nicky 2 (video game), a 1993 videogame, sequel to the 1992 game Nicky Boom, re-released in 2009 as Nicky Boom 2

== See also ==
- Nicky Nicky Nine Doors
- 'Nique (disambiguation)
- Nikki (disambiguation)
- Nickey (disambiguation)
- Nickie (disambiguation)
- Nicki
- Nikky
- Niky
