= Nicky =

- Gender: Unisex
- Language: English

Origin
- Languages: English, French, Greek
- Origin: 1. Nicholas; 2. Nicole; 3. Nicola
- Region of origin: Europe

Other names
- Variant forms: Nickey; Nickie; Nicki; Nicci; Nikki; Niki
- Related names: Nicholas, Nicole, Nicola, Nicolas, Niccolò, Nicol, Nicolae, Nicolaas, Nicolao, Nicolau, Nicoleta, Nicoletta, Nicolette, Nicolai, Nicolay, Nicolaj, Nicușor, Nicanor, Nicholaus, Nickolaus, Nicolaus, Nicolina, Niclas, Nicklas, Niculina, Dominic, Veronica, Bernice, Berenice

Nicky is a diminutive form of the name Nicholas, Nicola and Nicole, occasionally used as a given name in its own right. Sometimes it is spelled as Nikki, Niki. It can also be used as a diminutive of Dominic.

== People ==
=== Sports ===
- Nicky Adams (born 1986), English-born Welsh footballer
- Nicky Boje (born 1973), South African cricketer
- Nicky Butt (born 1975), English former footballer
- Nicky Forster (born 1973), English football manager and former player
- Nicky Grist (born 1961), Welsh former rally co-driver
- Nicky Hayden (1981–2017), American motorcycle racer
- Nicholas Latifi (born 1995), Canadian former racing driver, also known by his nickname Nicky
- Nicky Law (footballer born 1961), English football manager and former player
- Nicky Law (footballer born 1988), English midfielder; son of the above
- Nicky Little (born 1976), New Zealand rugby union footballer
- Nicky Maynard (born 1986), English footballer
- Nicky Rackard (1922–1976), Irish hurler
- Nicky Robinson (rugby union) (born 1982), Welsh rugby union footballer
- Nicky Shorey (born 1981), English footballer
- Nicky Summerbee (born 1971), English former footballer
- Nicky Weaver (born 1979), English football goalkeeper
- Nicky Winmar (born 1965), former Australian rules footballer
- Dolph Ziggler (born 1980), American professional wrestler and comedian, also known by his ring name Nicky

=== Music ===
- Nicky Astria (born 1967), Indonesian rock singer
- Nicky da B (1990–2014), American rapper specializing in the regional genre of bounce music
- Nicky Byrne (born 1978), singer and member of Irish pop group Westlife
- Nicky Chinn (born 1945), British songwriter and record producer
- Nicky Hopkins (1944–1994), English pianist and organist
- Nicky Jam (born 1980), stage name of reggaeton artist Nick Rivera Caminero
- Nicky Mehta, Canadian singer and songwriter
- Nicky Nola (born 1985), Ugandan singer and dancer
- Nicky Romero (born 1989), Dutch DJ and record producer
- Nicky Ryan (born 1949), Irish music producer, recording engineer and manager
- Nicky Thomas (1949–1990), Jamaican reggae singer
- Nicky Wire (born 1969), Welsh lyricist, bassist and occasional vocalist

=== Other ===
- Tsar Nicholas II of Russia (1868–1918), called "Nicky" by Kaiser Wilhelm II and King George V
- Nicky Arnstein (1879–1965), American professional gambler and con artist, best known as the second husband of Fanny Brice
- Nicky Best, British statistician
- Nicky Campbell (born 1961), Scottish radio and television presenter and journalist
- Nicky Case (born 1994), Canadian game developer
- Nicky Cruz (born 1938), Christian evangelist and former gang leader
- Nicky Gavron (born 1941), British politician, Deputy Mayor of London (2000–2003, 2004–2008), and member of the London Assembly
- Nicky Gumbel (born 1955), Anglican priest and author
- Nicky Henson (1945–2019), English actor
- Conrad Hilton, Jr. (1926–1969), American socialite and businessman; grand-uncle of Nicky Hilton
- Nicky Hilton (born 1983), American socialite, heiress and fashion designer, sister of Paris Hilton
- Nicky Jones (born 1996), American kid actor
- Nicky Katt (1970–2025), American actor
- Nicky Morgan (born 1972), British Member of Parliament (MP), former Education Secretary (2014–2016)
- Nicky Nickerson (1962–1993), American criminal and murderer
- Nicky Verstappen (1987–1998), Dutch homicide victim

== Fictional characters ==
- Nicky, hero of the film Little Nicky, played by Adam Sandler
- Nicky (Avenue Q), in the Broadway musical Avenue Q
- Nick Tilsley, originally called Nicky, in the soap opera Coronation Street
- The title character of the movie Nicky Deuce
- Nicky Katsopolis, a character from Full House
- Nicky Little, the titular character's best friend from Pepper Ann
- Nicky Pearson, a character on This Is Us
- Nicky Spurgeon, a character from Focus, played by Will Smith
- Nicky, a character in the Geronimo Stilton book series
- Nicky Harper, one of four title characters on the television series Nicky, Ricky, Dicky and Dawn

== See also ==
- Nickey (disambiguation)
- Nickie (disambiguation)
- Nicki
- Nikky
- Niky
