= Nickey =

Nickey may refer to:

- Nickey (name), people with the given name or nickname Nickey
- Nickey Chevrolet, American car dealership
- Nickey line, former English railway

== See also ==
- Nicki
- Nikky
- Niky
- Nickie (disambiguation)
- Nicky (disambiguation)
- Nikki (disambiguation)
- 'Nique (disambiguation)
