= Santa Monica (disambiguation) =

Santa Monica is a city in the U.S. state of California.

Santa Monica may also refer to:

== Places ==
- Santa Mônica, Paraná, Brazil
- Santa Mônica, Lages, Brazil
- Santa Monica, a Hacienda in Tlalnepantla de Baz, Mexico
- Sta. Monica, Surigao del Norte, Philippines
- Santa Monica, Florida, U.S.
- Santa Monica Airport, Santa Monica, California, U.S.
- Santa Monica Boulevard, in Los Angeles County, California, U.S.
- Santa Mónica, Uruguay

== Songs ==
- "Santa Monica" (Everclear song), 1995
- "Santa Monica" (Savage Garden song), 1998
- "Santa Monica" (Theory of a Deadman song), 2005
- "Santa Monica", a song by Bedouin Soundclash from the 2001 album Root Fire

== Other uses ==
- Santa Monica Studio, an American video game developer
- Santa Monica (sculpture), a sculpture by Eugene Morahan

== See also ==
- Santa Monica Parish Church (disambiguation), name of several churches
- Saint Monica (c. 332 − 387), early Christian saint, mother of Augustine of Hippo
- Saint Monica (film), a 2002 Canadian film
- Sainte-Monique, Quebec (disambiguation), several places in Canada
- San Monique, a fictional location in Live and Let Die
- Monica (disambiguation)
- Monika (disambiguation)
- Monique (disambiguation)
