= Nikki =

Nikki may refer to:

== Arts and entertainment ==
=== Music ===
- Nikki (singer), Japanese-American singer Nikki Lee
- Nikki (Malaysian singer), Nikki Palikat (born 1985), a finalist in the first season of Malaysian Idol
- Nigar Jamal (born 1980) or Nikki, English-Azerbaijani singer
- Nikki (album), by Nikki Yanofsky, 2010
- Nikki, an album by Quruli, 2005
- "Nikki" (song), by Forever the Sickest Kids, 2013
- "Nikki", a song by Logic from Under Pressure, 2014
- "Nikki", a 1966 instrumental composition by Burt Bacharach

=== Other media ===
- Nikki (Barbie), a fashion doll in the Barbie toy line
- Nikki (DC Thomson), a 1980s girls' comic
- Nikki (TV series), a 2000s American series starring Nikki Cox
- Nikki: Wild Dog of the North, a 1961 Walt Disney film
- Nikki, a 2000 animated short film

== People and fictional characters ==
- Nikki (given name)

== Other uses ==
- Nikki, Benin, a city, arrondissement and commune
- Nikki (drug), marketing name of a birth control pill
- Nikki, the mascot of Swapnote

== See also ==
- Nicci (disambiguation)
- Nicki (disambiguation)
- Nicky (disambiguation)
- Nickey (disambiguation)
- Nickie (disambiguation)
- 'Nique (disambiguation)
- Nikii Daas
- NikkieTutorials
- Nikky Finney
- Nikky
- Niky
