= Nickie =

Nickie may refer to:

== People ==
Nickie is a given name and nickname.

=== Given name ===
- Nickie Antonio (born 1955), American politician

=== Nickname ===
- Nickie Aiken (born 1969), British politician
- Nickie Hall (born 1959), American gridiron football player
- Nickie Quaid (born 1989), Irish hurler

== Other ==
- Nickie Nina, Pakistani fashion label
- Nickie, a common name for Hypsophrys nicaraguensis

== See also ==
- Nikkie de Jager (born 1994), Dutch makeup artist and beauty vlogger
- Nickiesha Wilson (born 1986), Jamaican hurdler
- Nicki
- Nikky
- Niky
- Nickey (disambiguation)
- Nicky (disambiguation)
- Nikki (disambiguation)
- 'Nique (disambiguation)
