= Corvette Z06 =

Corvette Z06 may refer to:

- Chevrolet Corvette (C2) Z06, based on the C2 platform in 1963
- Chevrolet Corvette (C5) Z06, based on the C5 platform 2001–2004
- Chevrolet Corvette (C6) Z06, based on the C6 platform 2006–2013
- Chevrolet Corvette (C7) Z06, based on the C7 platform 2015–2019
- Chevrolet Corvette (C8) Z06, based on the C8 platform 2020

Originally, the Z06 designation was an order code for an options package in the 1963 model year. Zora Arkus-Duntov, known as the “father of the Corvette” came up with the idea to circumvent a 1957 corporate agreement between American manufacturers forbidding automobile racing. The Z06 designation included a revised rear end, a larger gas tank, more powerful motor, suspension tuning, and stronger brakes so that Corvette owners and enthusiasts could race their sports cars and represent Chevrolet in an informal sense. The Z06 order code/designation disappeared in the Chevrolet lineup after 1963, and returned in 2001 for the C5 generation of Corvettes. The Z06 has since been offered in each generation, from C5-C8. Each generation of Z06 has remained true to their roots, in that they represent a track ready, race-oriented Corvette over the more civilized road going base models.
