= Nikko (name) =

Notable people named Nikko include:

== Given name ==
- Nikko Boxall (born 1992), New Zealand-Samoan footballer for Viborg FF
- Nikko Briteramos (born 1983), American basketball player, convicted of intentional exposure to HIV
- Nikko Hurtado (born 1981), American tattoo artist
- Nikko Jenkins (born 1986), American spree killer
- Nikko Landeros (born 1989), American ice sledge hockey player
- Nikko Locastro (born 1988), American disc golf player
- Nikko London (born 1975), American television personality, singer and record producer
- Nikko Natividad (born 1993), Filipino model and dancer
- Nikko Patrelakis, Greek musician
- Nikko Reed (born 2003), American football player
- Nikko Remigio (born 1999), American football player
- Nikko Shonin (1246–1333), founder of Nichiren Shoshu Buddhism
- Nikko Smith (born 1982), American singer-songwriter

== Surname ==
- Joni Nikko (born 1994), Finnish ice hockey player for KalPa

== Fictional characters ==
- Nikko Halloran, a character in RoboCop 3, played by actress Remy Ryan

== See also ==
- Nikki (given name)
- Nikky
- Niko (disambiguation)
