= Borg-Warner T-10 Transmission =

The Borg-Warner T-10 was a 4-speed manual transmission for longitudinal engine automobiles.

== History and design ==
Through the 1950s, 3-speed manual transmissions were considered sufficient for typical American automobiles, but for sports cars a 4-speed transmission was seen as a necessity. In the mid 1950s Chevrolet only offered 3-speed transmissions, but decided that its Corvette sports car needed a 4-speed option. Based in part on a design patented by GM, Borg-Warner produced the T-10 4-speed transmission initially for the 1957 Corvette. The new 4-speed transmission was a Corvette exclusive option until 1959, when Chevrolet first introduced it as an option for other models. Through the 1960s, other American automakers, including Studebaker, Ford, Chrysler, and eventually American Motors began introducing the T-10 transmission as a performance option. In 1963 GM started production of its own heavy-duty transmission, the Muncie 4-speed, but the T-10 was still used by many manufacturers due to its wide availability.

In the early 1970s Borg-Warner replaced the original T-10 with the Super T-10. This was an improved and stronger version and featured hardened gears, strengthened cases, and additional ratios, and it was used in performance cars through the 1980s. Starting in 1984, Doug Nash began producing the Super T-10, including an overdrive variant in the top 3 gears known as the "4+3" primarily for GM's niche market Chevrolet Corvette. By 1989, Richmond Gear took over production of the Super T-10.

By the mid 1980s, manufacturers moved towards more modern 5-speeds and largely stopped offering the T-10 transmission as original equipment. The Super T-10 remained popular as a specialty product primarily marketed to the aftermarket or 'hot rodder' market. Small scale production continues today.

== Models ==
- 1957-1973: T-10
- 1974-1983: Super T-10
- 1984-1988: Super T-10 4+3 (Doug Nash)
- 1989-present: Super T-10 Plus (Richmond Gear)

== Applications ==
- 1957–62; 1975-88 Chevrolet Corvette
