= Bill Thomas Cheetah =

American sports car (built 1963–1966)

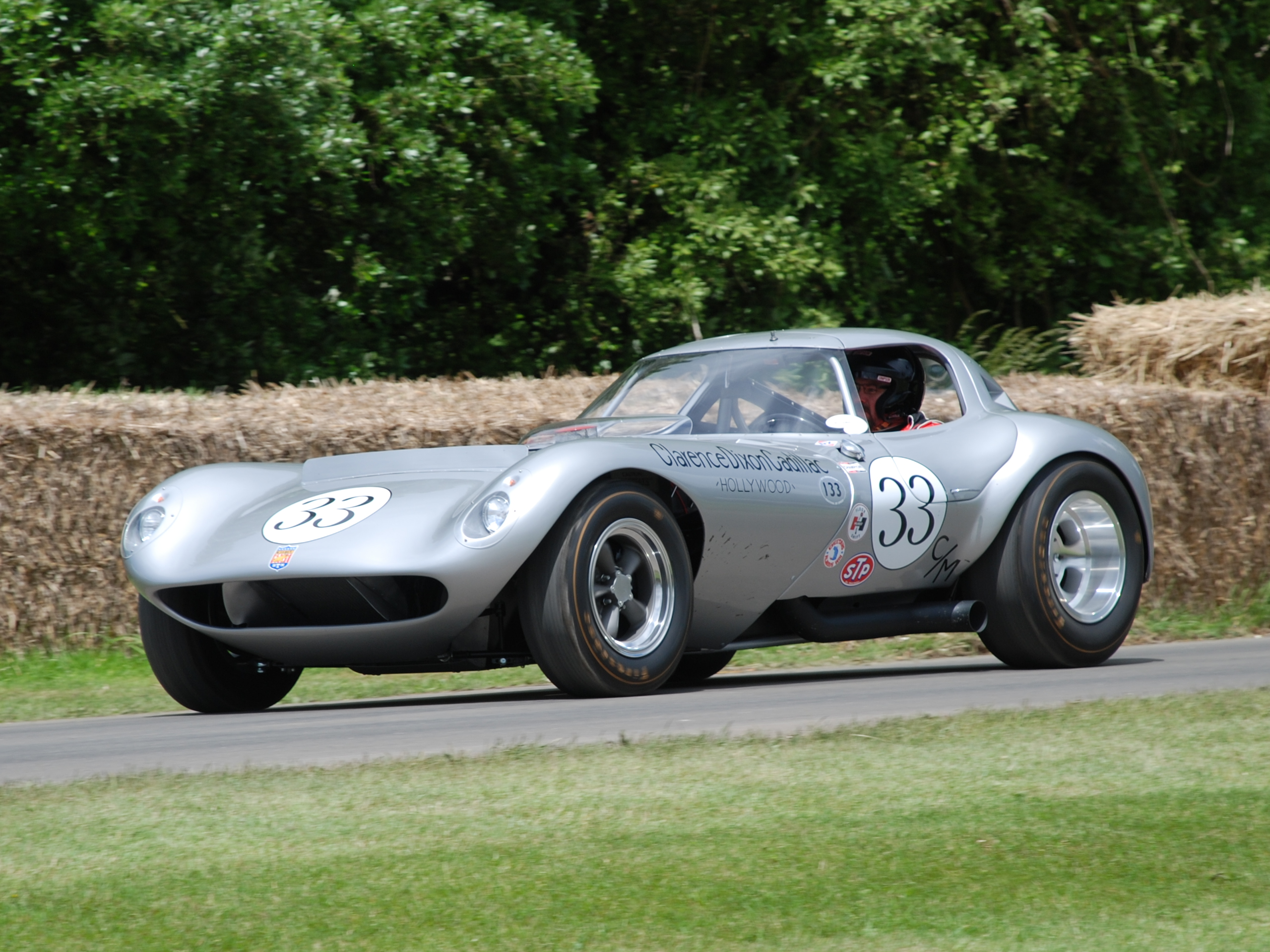

Overview
- Manufacturer: Bill Thomas
- Production: 1963–1966

Body and chassis
- Class: Sports car
- Body style: 2-door coupe
- Layout: Front mid-engine, rear-wheel-drive

Powertrain
- Engine: 327 cu in (5.4 L) Small-Block V8
- Transmission: 4-speed manual

Dimensions
- Wheelbase: 2,286 mm (90.0 in)
- Length: 3,556 mm (140.0 in)
- Width: 1,727 mm (68.0 in)
- Height: 1,067 mm (42.0 in)
- Curb weight: 748 kg (1,649 lb)

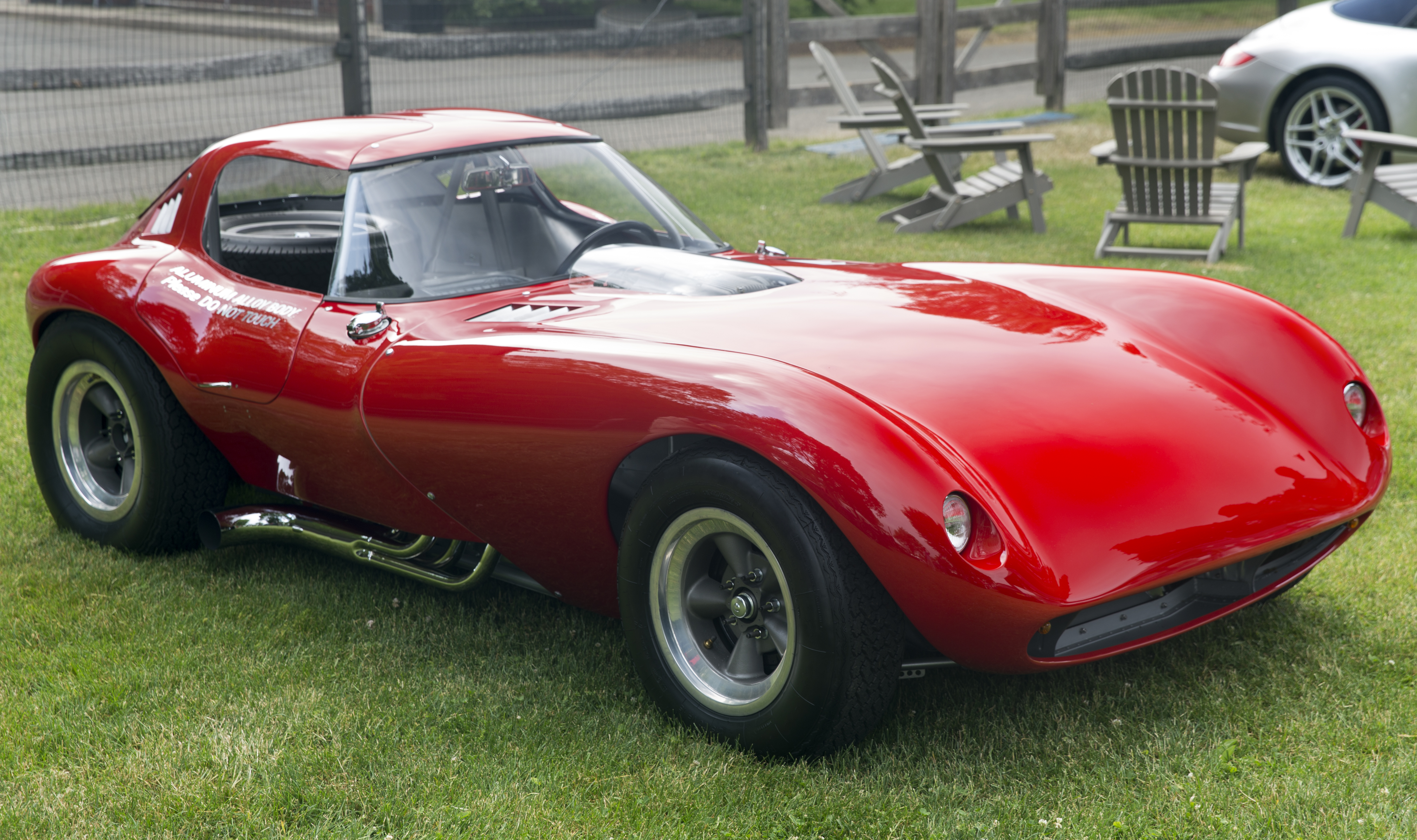
Cheetah number 002, aluminum-bodied

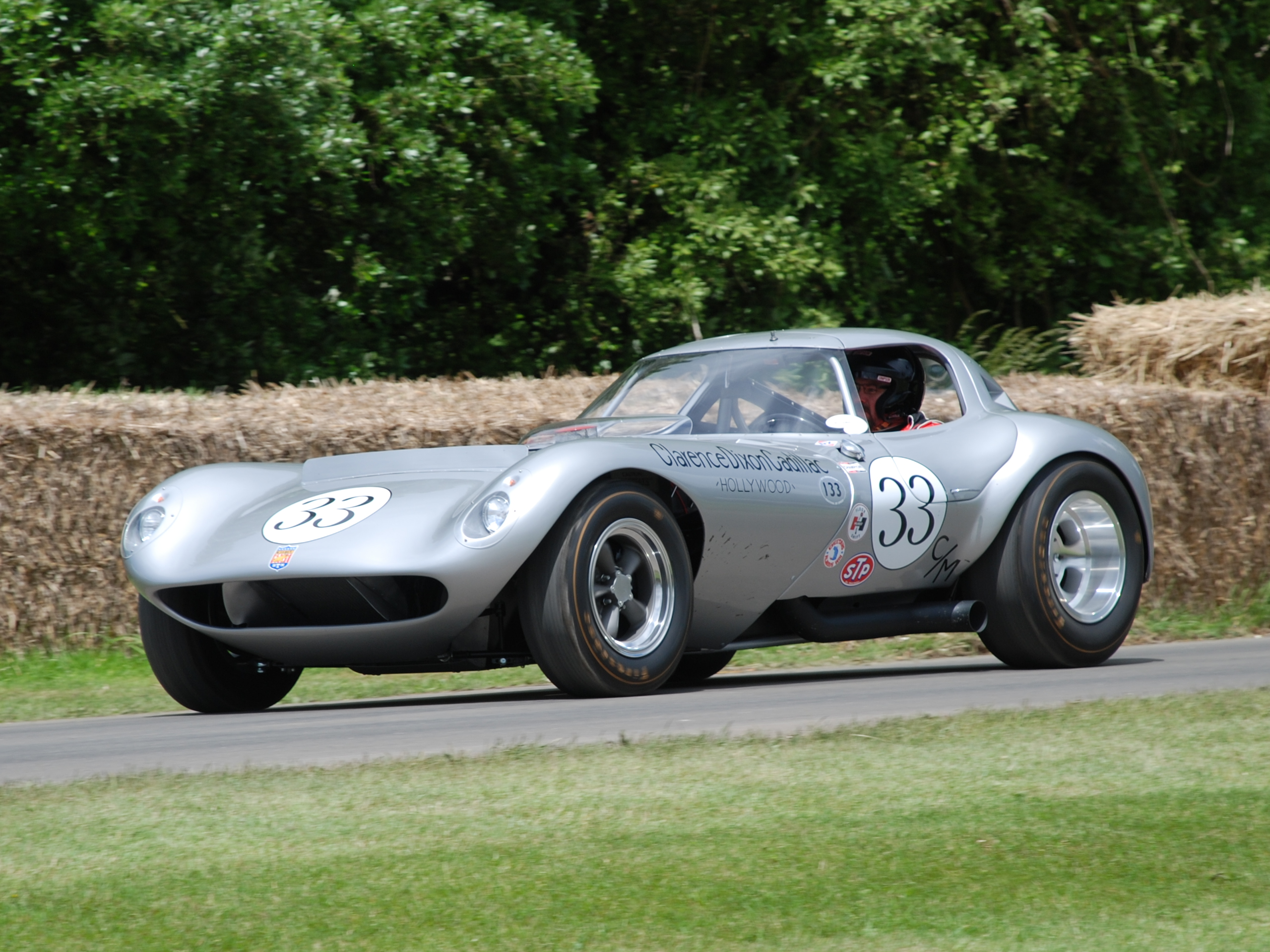
An original 1964 Cheetah on track at the 2016 Goodwood Festival of Speed

The Bill Thomas Cheetah was an American sports car designed and engineered entirely with American components, and built from 1963 to 1966 by Chevrolet performance tuner Bill Thomas. It was developed as a competitor to Carroll Shelby's Cobra.

== Bill Thomas ==
William P. "Bill" Thomas was born on May 28, 1921, and lived in Anaheim, California. In 1956 Thomas commenced work tuning and modifying Chevrolet Corvettes for racing for C S Mead Motors Co. By 1960, Thomas had started his own company, Bill Thomas Race Cars. At that time General Motors approached him to undertake performance work on the new Chevrolet Corvair. He also prepared the 1962 409 Bel Airs and Biscaynes for drag racing and another Chevrolet stock car for Louis Unser who won its division of the Pikes Peak International Hill Climb. He was also contracted by GM to develop the Chevy II.

Bill Thomas died October 10, 2009.

== Design and development ==
=== Prototype ===
In 1963 Thomas gained covert support from General Motors Performance Product Group head Vince Piggins to develop the Cheetah as a concept vehicle. It was designed by Thomas and Don Edmunds, his lead fabricator. Edmunds is credited with the bulk of the construction of the car. Financing for the project came from private investors, Thomas, and John Grow, a Rialto California Chevrolet dealer. Grow owned the prototype car. Using his racing connections, Thomas arranged for material assistance from Chevrolet for the major components - the Corvette 327 engine, Muncie transmission, and independent rear-end assemblies. Other components were stocked from the larger GM parts bin, such as Chevrolet passenger car spindles, and NASCAR spec Chevrolet drum brakes.

=== Design and build ===
Following delivery of the drivetrain components, Edmunds laid them out on the shop floor and began taking measurements. Using chalk, Edmunds sketched the basic outline of the chassis. The original blueprints of the Cheetah by Edmunds consisted of a few simple drawings showing the major components in block form, with major dimensions marked. Edmunds' design methodology for the majority of cars he built during his career was to sketch what he thought a car ought to look like, then build it. Only his last few Indy cars involved professional designers.

Once the chassis shape was determined, Edmunds sketched the body. He showed his drawings to Thomas and after a few minor changes, began construction. The Cheetah was designed to be a cruising machine or styling exercise, not a racing car. Thomas wanted a prototype to show General Motors the level of work his company could do with the intent to obtain additional contract work. After construction began Thomas decided the car would also compete on the racetrack to further promote the concept. The chassis had not been designed for this and therefore was not rigid enough for racing. This problem emerged once the car began to compete.

Once Edmunds had the lower half of a rolling chassis built, he constructed a plywood body form or "buck" on which fit on top of the chassis. The buck included removable metal frames which showed the outline of the windows. Once completed, the body buck and forms were sent to California Metal Shaping for an aluminium body and Aircraft Windshield Co for the windows. Once returned to Thomas', it was finished by Don Borth and Edmunds. A second car was also constructed with an aluminum body in December 1963, for testing by the Chevrolet Engineering Center. The remainder of the cars were bodied in fiberglass.

=== Production models ===
The production models used fiberglass bodies. The first were produced by two different companies - Contemporary Fiberglass and Fiberglass Trends. Contemporary Fiberglass was selected to produce the bodies following some problems with the Fiberglass Trends molds. Fiberglass Trends went on to produce their own version of the Cheetah under the name GTR, which was used for drag racing.

The Cheetah's chassis was constructed of Drawn Over Mandrel (DOM) cro-moly tubing that was heliarc welded (more commonly referred to as TIG or tungsten inert gas welding) using a P&H Mining DAR-200 welder. The design of the car was unusual in that it was front engined, but with the engine sitting so far back in the chassis that the output yoke of the transmission connected directly to the input yoke on the independent rear suspension's central differential "pumpkin" housing, basically making the driveshaft only a universal joint linking the transmission with the differential. With the engine positioned in this manner, the driver's legs were beside the engine. The exhaust system headers passed over the top of the driver's and passenger's legs. The tops of the footboxes were curved to make room for Edmunds' handmade headers. This design takes the attributes of what is known as an FRM layout to an extreme. Consequently, this design gave a front/rear weight distribution roughly approximating a mid-engined vehicle without the cost of an expensive transaxle arrangement. This design style resulted in a hot driver's compartment - an issue that would impact the Cheetah's performance on the track.

=== Super-Cheetah project ===
Former employees believe that the No. 001 aluminum car sold to Chevrolet for evaluation and later repurchased by Thomas formed the base model for the "Super Cheetah" project. This prototype Super Cheetah was intended to become the new 1965 improved street Cheetah, which was also rumored that it was going to be raced at Le Mans. Work started on the Super Cheetah early in 1964, roughly within the same timeframe as Carroll Shelby's "Ferrari-focused" Shelby Daytona racing coupe. A 4130 chrome moly steel space frame was produced for the Super Cheetah, incorporating changes suggested by Chevrolet during its evaluations at Riverside with input from Bob Bondurant, Jerry Titus, and others from June 1963 to 1964. The redesign also incorporated changes learned from experience with racing the original Cheetahs.

The interior was widened for driver comfort with two more inches on either side of the foot pedal, the steering rack-and-pinion moved to rear steer position of the front spindles (unlike Bill's first design front steer position on the 1964 model), the front frame section had 7° caster built into it, the front shock tower area had new diagonal tubing installed to limit chassis flex, the front upper and lower a-arms had ball joints and the rear chassis area was enlarged to allow for more fuel capacity. The project was never finished by Thomas because of Chevrolet's decision to withdraw its support.

== Racing history ==
=== Races, drivers, and owners ===
Originally, the car was designed with Dave MacDonald in mind as the driver; Thomas and MacDonald had established a long-standing racing relationship in Corvettes. Carroll Shelby offered MacDonald the opportunity to drive the Cobra, which MacDonald accepted. However, MacDonald died on May 30, 1964, driving at Indianapolis.

The Cheetah was to debut at the 1963 Los Angeles Times Grand Prix but crashed in practice two days before with Don Horvath at the wheel. Its aluminium body was replaced by a fibreglass one. Its first event was at the Cal-Club, Riverside International Raceway event on February 1, 1964. It crashed at the end of the first lap with Jerry Titus at the wheel. A water hose had come off, spraying water under the rear wheels causing the car to skid off the track at the turn. Titus raced the car throughout the 1964 season. He was a vocal advocate of the Cheetah as a contributing journalist for Sports Car Graphic magazine. In 1965, Jerry Entin became the car's owner (race car number 58) and he raced it with some success. This car was used in the Elvis Presley movie Spinout.

The third car, the first fibreglass bodied, was sold to Ralph Salyer in 1964 and converted to a roadster. He raced it in 1964 Challenge Cup at Daytona. It was the most successful racing Cheetah, winning 11 minor events between 1964 and 1965. Salyer's car (race car number 25) was known as the Cro-Sal Cheetah, named after its mechanic Gene Crowe as well as Salyer. Crowe converted it to a roadster to keep Salyer from suffering heat exhaustion due to the problem of heat buildup in the driver's compartment from the exhaust pipes.

Bud Clusserath purchased the fourth car (race car number 46) for the same race. Allan Green brought the fifth car (race car number 17) for Jerry Grant to race in the Challenge Cup, but he crashed in practice.

The sixth car was also ordered by Alan Green Chevrolet of Burien/Seattle, Washington, and was built to racing specifications. It raced in the USRRC race series (race car number 15). Its outstanding documented racing record includes 10 Federation Internationale de L’Automobile (FIA) events in 1964-65. In 2009, this Cheetah received a FIA-issued Historic Technical Passport (HTP). The HTP makes this Cheetah eligible for any FIA-sanctioned vintage event in the world. This is the only Bill Thomas Cheetah to have a HTP. Alan Green Chevrolet took delivery of this Cheetah in March, 1964. It was raced extensively during the 1964 and 1965 seasons, usually under the Alan Green Chevrolet banner. Its maiden race, a California Sports Car Club event, took place at Pomona, California, on March 22, 1964. Although, it was delivered in red, it was repainted "Alan Green green", in approximately June, 1964.

The seventh car was also acquired by Allan Green, for his wife for normal road use.

The eighth car was not raced until more recently at vintage events by Skip Gunnell. Jack Goodman purchased ninth car the Dixon Cadillac (race car number 33) and after it was sold to James Phillips it was modified, winning the 1968 A/SR championship for the Southern Pacific Region of the SCCA in 1968. Don Grieb drag raced the tenth car.

=== Performance issues ===
Besides heat impact on the driver, the engine was also prone to overheating, due in no small part to the failure to account for vents to draw hot air out of the engine compartment. Eventually, the overheating problems were solved by using a larger Pontiac NASCAR radiator, by cutting various configurations of holes in the hood and full-length belly pan and lastly by adding spoilers to draw the hot air out from underneath the hood (the first hood spoiler was actually a rope that ran across the hood from fender to fender.) Another major problem was due to the aforementioned mid-stream change in purpose for the vehicle; because the car was originally designed as a proof-of-concept, the chassis lacked the rigidity necessary for road racing (little triangulation was incorporated into the original design). Under changing loads such as those experienced on a twisting road course, the vehicle's suspension geometry continually changed and proved difficult to handle, even for experienced drivers such as Jerry Titus. Adding power only aggravated the problem; under hard acceleration, the trailing arms could bow outwards, allowing the rear wheels to toe in. Owners of the car were able to improve handling by adding gussets and triangulation to the chassis, modified (or completely re-engineered) trailing arms and disc brakes.

Despite some adverse handling tendencies on road courses, few cars could catch it in a straight line due to its Thomas-built 377 cu in (6.2 L) displacement, dual air-meter, fuel-injected Chevy small-block V8 based engine.

== Demise ==
In 1964, race car rules changed from 100 cars needed for homologation to 1000 cars. This prompted Chevrolet to advise Thomas that they would no longer support the Cheetah project. Another major factor ending the project was the rapidly evolving race car design and true mid-engined configurations represented the wave of the future. For instance Shelby Daytona coupes were rendered obsolete by the Ford GT40.

Thomas, faced with these negative factors as well as a fire that destroyed his factory on 9 September 1965, made the business decision to end production of the Cheetah and move on to other projects, including collaboration with Nickey Chevrolet on custom Camaros. The last documented Bill Thomas produced Cheetah was ordered in the fall of 1965 and delivered in April 1966.

== Collectables and anniversary ==
Given their provenance, high performance potential coupled with some race successes, and popularity with slot car fans for their unique shape, the remaining original cars have appreciated in value and are largely considered collector items.

A gathering of Cheetahs was held at Road America in 2014 to celebrate the cars 50th anniversary. Members of Bill Thomas' family attended.

== Cars ==
No official records are known to exist documenting the exact number of cars produced, but best estimates indicate as many as 23 cars were built to varying degrees of completion and configuration. This estimate is based on the number of fiberglass bodies produced by the chosen manufacturer selected by Thomas and by the documented production number of the last known original Cheetah. Bob Auxier of BTM Race Cars places the number at 19 chassis and 33 bodies.

The following based on the list of frames from Bob Ryan's journal.

Frame No.	Body	Material	Owner	Comments
1	California Metal Shaping	Aluminum	Chevrolet	Used as base for incomplete Super Cheetah, although Frame No. 11 cited for this purpose Owned now and raced at historic events by Duncan Pittaway
2	California Metal Shaping	Aluminum - rebodied in fibreglass, since restored	Chevrolet Engineering Center	First one raced and when owned by Jerry Entin appeared in the movie Spinout
3	Contemporary Fiberglass	Fibreglass	Ralph Salyer	Converted to a roadster and raced as the Cro-Sal Special
4	Contemporary Fiberglass	Fibreglass	Bud Clusserath	
5	Contemporary Fiberglass	Fibreglass	Allan Green	
6	Contemporary Fiberglass	Fibreglass	Allan Green	
7	Contemporary Fiberglass	Fibreglass	Allan Green	
8	Contemporary Fiberglass	Fibreglass	Thomas Friedkin	Raced by Skip Gunnell in vintage events
9	Contemporary Fiberglass	Fibreglass	Jack Goodman	Called the Dixon Cadillac and successfully raced in the 1968 A/SR championship by James Phillips
10	Contemporary Fibreglass	Fibreglass	Don Greib	Drag racer
11				Super Cheetah - never completed
12				Bare frame never completed
13				Bare frame never completed
14				Bare frame never completed
15				Used on rebodied No. 1 car after car wrecked at Riverside in 1964
16				Used on rebodied No. 2 car of Jerry Entin
	Fibreglass Trends	Fibreglass		Only one built for Bill Thomas - later models were the Fibreglass Trends GTR

== Replicas and reproductions ==
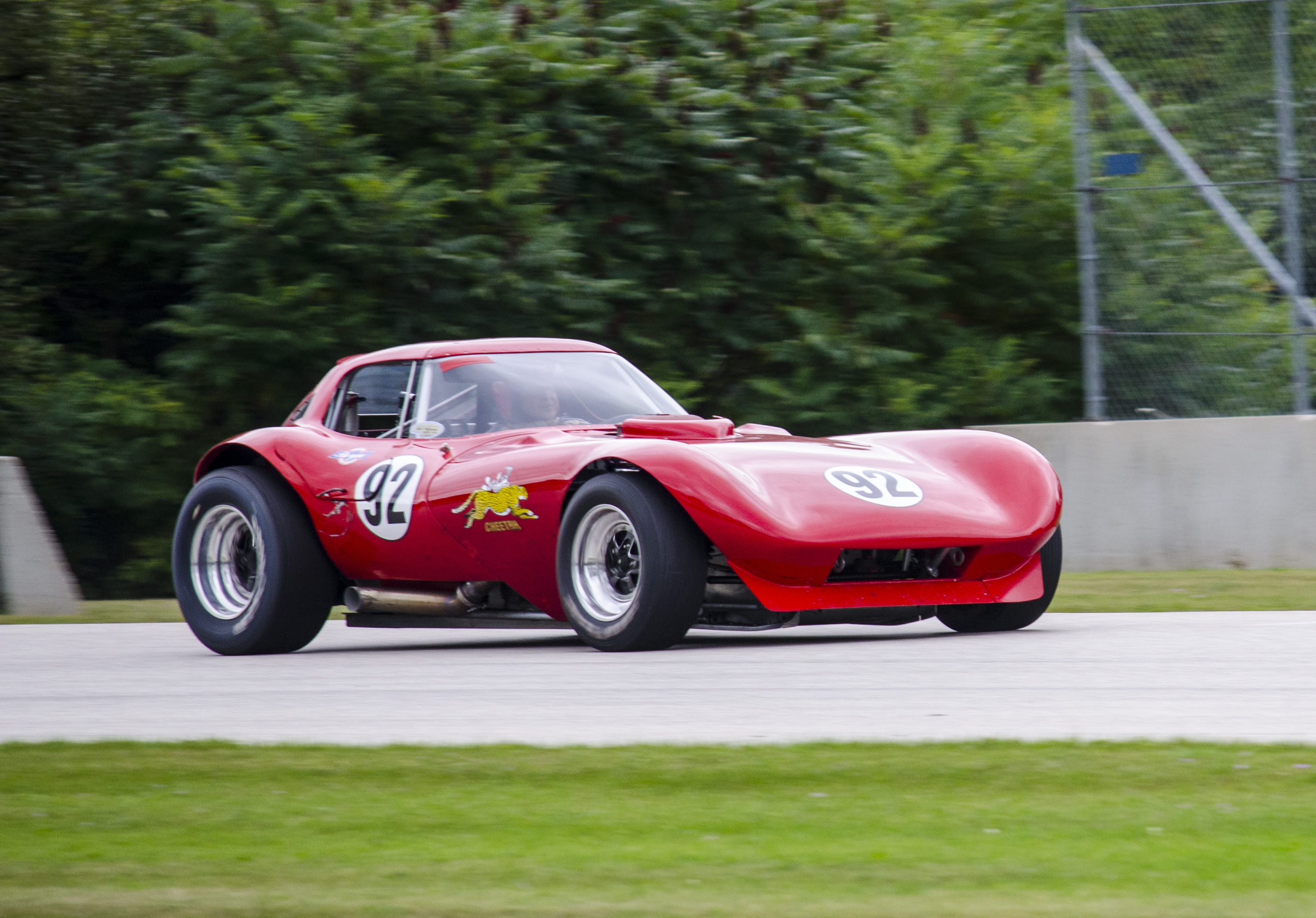
Racing Cheetah

After Bill Thomas stopped making the Cheetah, Fibreglass Trends made a replica of the Cheetah called the GTR from 1965 till at least 1989. Their version was primarily aimed at drag racers. It had an A pillar from the roof to the base of the windshield, something Bill Thomas' original Cheetah race car design did not have. According to some sources Dean Morrison bought the rights to make replica Cheetahs. He sold these in 1983 to Buford Everett.

In 1996 Bob Auxier built his first Cheetah and through of BTM Race Cars built continuation Cheetahs with Thomas' agreement from 2001 until at least 2013. About 46 cars were built by BTM. Sometime in the 2000s, there appears to have been a possible dispute or disagreement between Auxier and the Thomas family. Legal action filed by BTM against the Thomas family on March 18, 2014, in the California Central District Court resulted in judgement against BTM on September 1, 2015, holding that the authorisation by William Thomas II for BTM to make continuation Cheetahs had ceased on his death on October 10, 2009. BTM ceased making continuation Cheetahs on August 20, 2015, according to their website. However, more recent updates to the website indicate an ongoing dispute over the trademarks.

Allied Fiberglass also offered replica bodies for sale for a time. Since about 2010 Ruth Engineering and Racing Inc of Grafton Ohio have made an updated version called the RER Cheetah Evolution which uses contemporary running gear. Shell Valley Classic Wheels of Nebraska also currently make a kitcar version.

== Trade mark ==
On September 12, 2013, William P Thomas III applied for and was granted the USPTO Bill Thomas Cheetah trademark SN 86063410. The federal status of the trademark filing as at April 28, 2015, was Notice of Allowance issued. The trademark categories covered are vehicles and products for locomotion by land, air, or water; clothing products; construction and repair services. The description provided to the USPTO for Bill Thomas Cheetah is race cars, and parts for race cars - namely, structural parts, trims, and badges. C Justin O'Rourke had applied for the trademark on March 10, 2011, but did not proceed with it.

According to BTM's website in 2016 BTM and some of the Thomas family were involved in a dispute before the Trademark Appeals Board over the ownership of Cheetah trademarks. BTM asserts that Bill Thomas transferred trademarks to BTM in 2006 under an agreement between Thomas and Robert Auxier.
