= Sainte-Monique, Quebec =

Sainte-Monique, Quebec may refer to:

- Sainte-Monique, Centre-du-Québec, Quebec, in Nicolet-Yamaska Regional County Municipality
- Sainte-Monique, Saguenay–Lac-Saint-Jean, in Lac-Saint-Jean-Est Regional County Municipality, Quebec
- Sainte-Monique, Mirabel, Quebec, Mirabel, Quebec (1872-1971), now in Ville de Mirabel
- Sainte-Monique, Quebec (designated place), a community in Sainte-Monique, Centre-du-Québec, Quebec

== See also ==
- Santa Monica (disambiguation)
- Monique (disambiguation)
