= Nikki (given name) =

Nikki is a given name. It is commonly a nickname for Nicholas and its variants Nikolina, Nicole, Nicola; and Nikita, and Veronica. It is also a Punjabi name (Gurmukhi: ਨਿੱਕੀ; Shahmukhi: نکی) meaning “little one”, with its male counterpart being Nikku (Gurmukhi: ਨਿੱਕੂ; Shahmukhi: نکو).

== Arts and entertainment ==
=== Music ===
- Nikki Hornsby, American singer-songwriter
- Nikki Kerkhof (born 1983), Dutch singer, and winner of Idols 4
- Nikki Lee, Japanese-American singer known as Nikki (singer)
- Nikki McKibbin (1978–2020), American singer in the 2002 debut season of American Idol
- Nikki Sixx (born 1958), Mötley Crüe bassist
- Nikki Stringfield, guitarist for The Iron Maidens and Before The Mourning
- Nikki Sudden (1956–2006), English singer-songwriter and guitarist
- Nikki Webster (born 1987), Australian pop star and model
- Nikki Yanofsky (born 1994), Canadian jazz-pop singer

=== Television, film, and stage ===
- Nikki Bacolod (born 1989), Filipina actress and musician
- Nikki Bedi (born 1966), television and radio presenter
- Nikki Blonsky (born 1988), American actress known as Tracy Turnblad in the remake of Hairspray
- Nikki Cox (born 1978), American actress known for roles in Unhappily Ever After and Las Vegas
- Nikki Crawford, American stage actress
- Nikii Daas (born 1988), Indian model, actress and beauty queen
- Nikki DeLoach (born 1979), American actress
- Nikki Gil (born 1987), Filipina singer, actress, host, model and VJ
- Nikki Glaser (born 1984), comedian
- Nikki Grahame (1982–2021), contestant on Big Brother 7 in the UK
- Nikki Patel (born 1990), British actress from Coronation Street
- Nikki Reed (born 1988), American actress known as Rosalie Hale in The Twilight Saga
- Nikki Sanderson (born 1984), British actress known as Candice Stowe in Coronation Street
- Nikki Tamboli (born 1996), Indian film actress
- Nikki Tilroe (1941–2005), Canadian puppeteer known as the Mime Lady on Today's Special
- Nikki Valdez (born 1981), Filipino actress and singer
- Nikki Ziering (born 1971), American model and actress

=== Professional wrestling ===
- Nikki Bella (born 1983), ring name of American professional wrestler Stephanie Nicole Garcia-Colace
- Nikki Roxx, a ring name of American professional wrestler Nicole Raczynski
- Nikki Cross (born 1989), a ring name of Scottish professional wrestler Nicola Glencross

=== Adult entertainment ===
- Nikki Benz, Canadian pornographic actress and film director
- Nikki Tyler (born 1972), American former pornographic actress

== Sports ==
- Nikki Bishop (born 1973), Australian equestrian
- Nikki Boon (born 2001), Dutch heptathlete
- Nikki Franke (born 1951), American fencer and fencing coach
- Nikki Garrett (born 1984), Australian professional golfer
- Nikki Kidd (born 1987), Scottish field hockey forward
- Nikki Teasley (born 1979), basketball player for the Washington Mystics in the Women's National Basketball Association

== Other fields ==
- Nikki Allan (died 1992), English murder victim
- Nikki Craft (born 1949), American political activist, feminist, artist and writer
- Nikki Denholm, New Zealand photographer and humanitarian
- Nikki Giovanni (born 1943), American poet and author
- Nikki Haley (born 1972), governor of South Carolina
- Nikki Hemming (born 1967), CEO of Sharman Networks and President of LEF Interactive
- Nikki Kaye (1980–2024), New Zealand politician
- Nikki Porcher, American politician
- Nikki Thomas, Canadian women's rights activist and former prostitute
- Nikki Whitehead, American victim of matricide

== Fictional characters ==
- Nikki (comics), member of the Guardians of the Galaxy
- Nikki Darling, a character on the 1980s animated television series Beverly Hills Teens
- Nikki Fernandez, on the ABC television drama Lost
- Nikki Maxwell, main character in the Dork Diaries book series
- Nikki Morris, a character in the 2004 video game Need for Speed: Underground 2, voiced by Kelly Brook
- Nikki Newman, in the CBS soap opera The Young and The Restless
- Nikki Velasco, a character in That 90's Show
- Nikki Wong, on the Canadian animated television series 6teen
- Nikki, a.k.a. Naoko Yanagisawa, from the Japanese anime series Cardcaptor Sakura/ Cardcaptors, voiced by Kelly Sheridan in the English dub
- Nikki (Dead or Alive character), from the Dead or Alive video game series
- Nikki Nicholson, a character from the 1951 film, The Thing from Another World
- Nikki Freeman, a character from the 2025 film, Obsession
- Nikki Finn, a character from the 1987 film, Who's That Girl?
- Nikki, on the webseries The Strangerhood
- Nikki, subject of the song "Darling Nikki" by R&B musician Prince
- Nikki, from the Diva Starz toy line
- Nikki, in the 2009 sex comedy film Spread, portrayed by Ashton Kutcher
- Nikki, protagonist of Queensryche's album Operation: Mindcrime
- Nikki, one of two protagonists in the video game Pandemonium!
- Nikki Ann-Marie, a dateable character in the dating simulation videogame Huniepop
- Nikki, a character in the 2006 video game Need for Speed: Carbon, voiced by Emmanuelle Vaugier

== See also ==
- Nicci (disambiguation)
- Nicki (disambiguation)
- Nicole (disambiguation)
- Nicolette (disambiguation)
- Niki (given name)
- Nikki (disambiguation)
- Nikky
