= Monica =

Monica may refer to:

== People ==
- Monica (given name), including a list of people and fictional characters with the name
- Monica (actress) (born 1987), Indian film actress
- Mônica (footballer, born 1978) (Mônica Angélica de Paula)
- Mônica (footballer, born 1987) (Mônica Hickmann Alves)
- Monica (singer) (born 1980)
- Saint Monica, mother of Augustine

== Places ==
- Monica, Kentucky, U.S.
- 833 Monica, a minor planet

== Arts, entertainment and media ==
=== Film ===
- Monica (2011 film), an Indian film
- Monica (2022 film), an American-Italian film

=== Music ===
- Monica Yunus
- "Monica" (2025 song), by Sublahshini, Anirudh Ravichander and Asal Kolaar
- MONICA, a Scottish band with members of The Apples and others
- Monica (Kinks song), song by the Kinks, 1968
- "Monica", a song by Dan Bern from the 1998 album Fifty Eggs
- "Monica", a 1984 song by Kōji Kikkawa
  - covered by Leslie Cheung, 1984
  - covered by Leo Ku on the 2005 album Jade Solid Gold
- Monica, 2026 album by Jack Harlow

=== Other uses in arts and entertainment ===
- Monica, a fictional country in Æon Flux
- Monica, a fictional planet in David Weber's science fiction Honorverse
- Monica (graphic novel), by Daniel Clowes, 2023

== Transportation ==
- Monica (automobile), 1972–1974
- Monica (radar)
- Monica (rocket)
- MV Monica, a Finnish coaster ship in service 1955–57, known later as MV Scantic

== Other uses ==
- List of storms named Monica
- Monica (grape)

== See also ==
- Monika (disambiguation)
- Moniker, or nickname
- Monique (disambiguation)
- Mounica (fl. from 2005), Indian film and TV actress
- Mounika (fl. from 1985), Indian film actress
- Santa Monica (disambiguation)
- Santa Monica, California
- "Monica, O My Darling" (song), from the 1971 Indian film Caravan
  - Monica, O My Darling, a 2022 Indian film, named after the song
  - "Run Down The City (Monica)", a remake of the song for the 2025 Indian film Dhurandhar
- Monica and Friends, a Brazilian comic book series and media franchise
