= Monique (disambiguation) =

Monique is a female given name.

Monique may also refer to:

- Monique (film), 1970 UK film
- Monique (play), 1957 play
- Radio Monique, offshore radio station broadcasting to the Low Countries
- Mount Monique, Antarctica; a mountain
- Sainte-Monique, Quebec (disambiguation), several places in Canada
- San Monique, a fictional location from Live and Let Die James Bond film
- Monique of Cambodia (born 1936) Queen Mother of Cambodia
- Mo’Nique (Monique Hicks, born 1967), American actress and comedian
- Tiffany Monique (born 1977), American singer

== See also ==
- Saint Monica (Sainte Monique) 4th century Christian saintess
- Santa Monica (disambiguation)
- Monica (disambiguation)
- Monika (disambiguation)
- 'Nique (disambiguation)
