= Nichi =

Nichi is a given name and nickname, and may refer to:

- Nichi Farnham (born 1963), American politician
- Nichi Hodgson (born 1983), British journalist, broadcaster, and author
- Nichi Vendola (born 1958), Italian politician

== See also ==
- Nicci (disambiguation)
- Nicki, a given name
