= Monika =

Monika may refer to:

== People and fictional characters ==
- Monika (given name)
- Monika (Doki Doki Literature Club!), a video game character
- Mounika, an Indian film actress

== Films ==
- Monika (1938 film), a German drama
- Monika (1974 film), an Italian comedy

== Music ==
- Monika (opera), a 1937 operetta by Nico Dostal
- Monika Enterprise, a record label
- Monika Christodoulou, a Greek musician known mononymously as Monika
- "Monika" (song), by Island, Cyprus' entry for Cyprus in the Eurovision Song Contest 1981
- "Monika", a 1969 song by Peter Orloff

== See also ==
- "Hej Hej Monika", a song by Nic & the Family
- Monica (disambiguation)
- Monique (disambiguation)
