= Muncie 4-Speed Transmission =

Manual transmission

Designed and manufactured by General Motors (GM) from 1963 to 1975, the GM Muncie 4-speed transmission was a manual transmission for longitudinal engine GM automobiles particularly in models utilizing higher power engines.

== History and Design ==
In the mid 1950s, Chevrolet needed a 4-speed transmission for its then relatively new Corvette sports car and did not manufacture its own 4-speeds at the time. Since it was not initially cost-effective to manufacture a 4-speed transmission in-house for a low production vehicle such as the Corvette, starting in 1957, GM procured Borg-Warner T-10 4-speeds. Borg-Warner had an excellent reputation for manual transmissions. Borg-Warner's T10 itself was itself was actually based on design plans and U.S. Patent 3,088,336 held by GM engineer James Fodrea. By 1963, GM sought to bring 4-speed transmission production with the introduction of its own standard wide-ratio 4-speed transmission. This new GM produced 4-speed transmission was itself a further iteration based upon the highly similar T10 with further improvements. As it was produced at GM's Muncie, Indiana factory, it has since become known simply as the Muncie 4-speed. The Muncie transmission featured four synchronized forward gears in the main case with a reverse gear in the tail shaft that had a lockout feature on the selector. The main case was aluminum. It improved upon the T10 design iteration, making it heavier duty with smooth shifting properties. While known for its smooth shifting, the Muncie 4-speed was capable of handling higher powered engines with greater torque which were becoming increasingly common to the era. Beyond the Corvette, the transmission was ultimately used in a wide variety of GM vehicles particularly those with special higher power output V8 engines.

During the mid to late 1970s, with a greater need for fuel efficiency mileage and resultant reductions in engine power levels, transmission requirements were evolving. 5-speeds were increasingly popular in manual transmission applications. And automatic 3-speed and (later) 4-speed (with overdrive) transmissions were likewise increasingly popular in automobiles.

By 1975, Muncie 4-speed production ended. GM began to utilize other transmissions including 5-speeds, newer automatics and, in some cases, reverted to Borg-Warner 4-speeds for a time.

=== Changes ===
Over the production years, a number of configuration changes occurred. The countershaft changed from 7/8 inch to 1 inch in 1966. The original 10-spline input shaft was changed to 26 spline in 1971 or 1971 depending on model. Finally, the 27-spline output shaft was changed to 32 spline in 1970 or 1971 again depending on model. Generally, later years are considered to have been improved.

== Models ==
- M20 — Standard wide ratio (2.56:1 1st gear or 2.52:1 1st gear) transmission 1963-74
- M21 — Optional close ratio (2.20:1 1st gear) transmission 1966-74
- M22 — Optional heavy duty close ratio (2.20:1 1st gear) transmission 1966-71. Used predominantly in racing and very high performance applications, M22 gears had a somewhat straighter profile for added strength to handle high torque applications. But this also made it noisier to operate with notable gear whine. The gear noise earned it's nickname of 'Rock Crusher'. Produced in very low numbers, known original M22s are particularly valuable today.

== Ratios ==
RPO	First	Second	Third	Fourth
1963-1965 M20	2.56:1	1.91:1	1.48:1	1.00:1
1966-1974 M20	2.52:1	1.88:1	1.46:1	1.00:1
M21	2.20:1	1.64:1	1.28:1	1.00:1
M22	2.20:1	1.64:1	1.28:1	1.00:1

== Applications ==
- 1963–74 Chevrolet Corvette
- 1967–73 Chevrolet Camaro
- 1967-73 Pontiac Firebird
- 1971-74 Holden HQ Monaro GTS (Australia)
