= Santa Monica Parish Church =

Santa Monica Parish Church may refer to any of the following churches:

- Santa Monica Parish Church (Angat), Bulacan, Philippines
- Santa Monica Parish Church (Minalin), Pampanga, Philippines
- Santa Monica Parish Church (Sarrat), Ilocos Norte, Philippines
- Santa Monica Parish Church, also known as Panay Church, Capiz, Philippines
- Santa Monica Parish Church in Rivas-Vaciamadrid, Spain, designed by es:Ignacio Vicens.
