= Nickey (name) =

Nickey is a given name, surname and a nickname, and may refer to:

== Given name ==
- Nickey Alexander, American drummer
- Nickey Browning (born 1951), American politician
- Nickey Iyambo (1936–2019), Namibian politician and physician

== Nickname ==
- Nickey Barclay (born 1951), American singer, songwriter and musician
- Nickey Brennan (born 1953), Irish former hurler
- Nickey Carroll (born 1972), Australian long-distance runner

== Surname ==
- Donnie Nickey (born 1980), American gridiron football player

== See also ==
- Nickey (disambiguation)
