= Nickey Chevrolet =

- Industry: Automotive sales
- Founded: 1925
- Founders: E.J. and Jack Stephani
- Defunct: 1973
- Headquarters: Chicago, USA

Nickey Chevrolet (also called Nickey Chicago) was a Chevrolet automobile dealership located in Chicago, Illinois, USA. Founded in 1925 by brothers E.J. and Jack Stephani, Nickey Chevrolet became one of the largest factory dealerships, specializing in high performance muscle car sales and services.

Nickey Chevrolet was originally established at 4120 Irving Park Road. When the Northwest Expressway (completed on 5 November 1960, and later renamed the Kennedy Expressway) was constructed, Nickey Chevrolet moved to 4501 W. Irving Park Road in Chicago. Nickey Chevrolet eventually grew to a 200,000-square-foot (19,000 m^{2}) facility.

The service department specialized in engine swaps, transplanting 427 cubic inch displacement (CID) "Big Block" Chevy engines into the very first 1967 Camaros, and soon after into Novas, Chevelles, Impalas, and Corvettes.

Nickey Chevrolet modified cars to their customers’ specifications. Because of their rarity, many of these dealer-modified cars are maintained in museums or private collections and are rarely seen in public.

The dealership was sold in 1973 and became Keystone Chevrolet. The new speed shop and automobile conversion centre was named "Nickey Chicago", and closed in 1977.

In 2002, a muscle car collector and enthusiast, Stefano Bimbi, purchased the legal rights and trademarks for the Nickey brand. The new company, Nickey Performance, now located at 6927 N Alpine Road in Loves Park, Illinois, builds, sells, and services vehicles branded as Nickey Super Cars, and has also taken steps to establish a registry for Nickey-modified cars.
