= Nicci =

Nicci may refer to:

- Nicci French, pseudonym of London journalists Nicci Gerrard (born 1958) and Sean French (born 1959)
- Nicci Gerrard (born 1958), London journalist
- Nicci Gilbert (born 1970), member of the American band Brownstone
- Nicci Jolly (born 1981), Scottish television presenter and Miss Scotland, 2003
- Nicci Juice (born 1975), one-time stage name of Nicole Saft, better known as Rollergirl
- Nicci Wright (born 1972), Canadian soccer player
- Nicci, a character in The Sword of Truth series by Terry Goodkind

== See also ==
- Nichi, a given name
- Nicki (disambiguation)
- Nikki (disambiguation)
