= Nicki =

Nicki is a given name, and may refer to:

== Film and television ==
- Nicki Aycox (1975–2022), American actress best known for her roles as Syl on the series Dark Angel and Stella Vessey on the dramedy Ed
- Nicki Chapman (born 1967), English television presenter who also works in the British pop music industry
- Nicki Clyne (born 1983), Canadian actress
- Nicki Hunter, American pornographic actress and director
- Nicki Paull, Australian actress
- Nicki Rapp, (born 1972) American voice actress
- Nicki Shields, English television presenter who also works as the Formula E pit lane reporter

== Other ==
- Nicki (singer), stage name of German pop singer Doris Andrea Hrda (born 1966)
- Nicki French (born 1964), English singer and dancer
- Nicki McNelly (born 1962), British Anglican priest
- Nicki Minaj (born 1982), Trinidadian rapper and singer
- Nicki Sørensen (born 1975), Danish male professional road bicycle racer

== See also ==
- Nichi
- Nicky
- Nickie
- Nicci (disambiguation)
- Nikki (disambiguation)
