= Niky =

Niky is a nickname and given name. Notable people with the name include:

- Niky Kamran (born 1959), Belgian mathematician
- Niky Wardley (born 1973), English actress actually named Nichola Petra Wardley
- Warinrat Yolprasong (born 2005), a member of the Thai girl group BNK48, whose nickname is Niky

== See also ==
- Niki (given name)
- Nicky
- Nikky
