= Nique =

Nique or 'Nique or variation, may refer to:

- Nique Clifford, American basketball player
- Nique Needles, Australian musician
- Rimi Nique, Thai singer-songwriter
- Alto de Nique, a mountain on the border of Panama and Colombia
- The Technique, the Georgia Institute of Technology student newspaper

== See also ==
- Niq, Azerbaijan, Iran
- Mo'Nique (born 1967), American comedian and actress
- Dominique (disambiguation)
- Monique (disambiguation)
