= Nikky =

Nikky is a nickname. Notable subjects known by this nickname include the following:

== Nickname ==
- Nikky Finney (born Lynn Carol Finney, 1957), American poet

== Fictional character ==
- Nikky Ferris, lead character played by Hayley Mills in the 1964 Walt Disney Productions film The Moon-Spinners

== See also ==
- Nicky
- Nikki (given name)
- Nikko (name)
- Niky
