= Nikolaus (given name) =

Nikolaus is a given name. Notable people with this name include the following:

== Given name ==
=== Art ===
- Nikolaus Geiger (1849–1897), German sculptor and painter.
- Nikolaus Gerhaert (c.1420 – 1473), Dutch sculptor
- Nikolaus Glockendon (fl. 1515 – 1534), German illustrator
- Nikolaus Hagenauer (c. 1445/1460 — 1538), German sculptor
- Nikolaus Knüpfer (1609–1655), Dutch painter
- Nikolaus van Hoy (b. Antwerp, 1631 – d. Vienna, 25 June 1679), Flemish painter

=== Military ===
- Nikolaus Andreas von Katzler (1696–1760), Prussian lieutenant general
- Nikolaus Barbie (1913–1991), German SS and Gestapo functionary known as Klaus Barbie
- Nikolaus Heilmann (1903–1945), German Nazi
- Nikolaus Heinrich von Schönfeld (1733–1795), Prussian general
- Nikolaus Herbet (1889 – unknown), German SS officer
- Nikolaus Ritter (1899–1974), German military officer
- Nikolaus von Falkenhorst (1885–1968), German general
- Nikolaus zu Dohna-Schlodien (1879–1956), German naval officer
- Nikolaus von Maillot de la Treille (1774–1834), Bavarian lieutenant general and War Minister
- Nikolaus von Rauch (1851–1904), Prussian cavalry officer
- Nikolaus von Vormann (1895–1959) German general

=== Music ===
- Nikolaus Harnoncourt (1929–2016), Austrian conductor
- Nikolaus Hillebrand (born 1948), German operatic bass-baritone
- Nikolaus Selnecker (1530–1592), German musician
- Nikolaus Simrock (1751–1832), German musician
- Nikolaus Kittel (1805/6 – 1868), Russian violin and bow make
- Nikolaus Kraft (1778–1853), Austrian cellist and composer
- Nikolaus Lehnhoff (1939–2015), German opera director
- Nikolaus Newerkla (born 1974), Austrian harpsichordist, arranger and conductor
- Nikolaus von Krufft (1779–1818), Austrian composer

=== Politician ===
- Nikolaus Berlakovich (born 1961), Austrian politician
- Nikolaus Dumba (1830–1900), Austrian politician
- Nikolaus Georg von Reigersberg (1598–1651), German politician
- Nikolaus Krell (c. 1551 – 1601), German politician
- Nikolaus Meyer zum Pfeil (1451–1500), Swiss renaissance humanist and politician
- Nikolaus Müller (1892–1980), German politician
- Nikolaus Welter (1871–1951), Luxembourgish writer and politician known as Nik Welter

=== Religion ===
- Nikolaus Creutzer (died 1525), Roman Catholic prelate
- Nikolaus Decius (c. 1485 – 1541), German monk
- Nikolaus von Laun, German Bohemian Augustinian friar
- Nikolaus Gross (1898–1945), German Roman Catholic
- Nikolaus Herman (c. 1500 – 1561), German Lutheran cantor
- Nikolaus Messmer (1954–2016), Kyrgyzstani Roman Catholic prelate
- Nikolaus Nilles (1828–31 – 1907), Luxembourgian Roman Catholic writer and teacher
- Nikolaus of Banz, Polish Roman Catholic canon
- Nikolaus Schienen (1491–1556), German Roman Catholic prelate
- Nikolaus Schneider (born 1947), German evangelical
- Nikolaus Storch (pre-1500 – after 1536), German radical lay-preacher
- Nikolaus von Dinkelsbühl, Austrian Roman Catholic clergyman, pulpit orator and theologian
- Nikolaus von Schönberg (1472–1537), German Cardinal

=== Royalty & nobility ===
- Jobst Nikolaus I, Count of Hohenzollern (1433–1488), German nobleman
- Nikolaus I, Prince Esterházy (1714–1790), Hungarian prince
- Nikolaus II, Prince Esterházy (1765–1833), Hungarian prince
- Nikolaus III, Prince Esterházy (1817–1894), Hungarian prince
- Nikolaus VI Graf Pálffy von Erdőd (1657–1732), Hungarian nobleman known as Miklós Pálffy
- Nikolaus Bodman (1903–1988), German nobleman, ornithologist and bird conservationist
- Nikolaus, Count Esterházy (1583–1645), Hungarian royal
- Nikolaus, Hereditary Grand Duke of Oldenburg (1897–1970), German royal
- Prince Nikolaus of Liechtenstein (born 1947), Liechtensteinian Ambassador
- Prince Nikolaus of Thurn and Taxis (1885–1919) (1885–1919), German royal
- Prince Nikolaus Wilhelm of Nassau (1832–1905), Prussian royal

=== Science ===
- Nikolaus Ager (1568–1634), French physician and botanist
- Nikolaus Correll (born 1977), German roboticist
- Nikolaus Eglinger (1645–1711), Swiss physician
- Nikolaus Friedreich (1825–1882), German scientist
- Nikolaus Joseph Brahm (1754–1821), German zoologist
- Nikolaus Joseph von Jacquin (1727–1817), Austrian scientist
- Nikolaus Hofreiter (1904–1990), Austrian mathematician
- Nikolaus Poda von Neuhaus (1723–1798), Austrian entomologist
- Nikolaus Riehl (1901–1990), German physicist
- Nikolaus Rüdinger (1832–1896), German anatomist
- Nikolaus Wolfgang Fischer (1782–1850), German chemist.

=== Sports ===
- Nikolaus Biewer (1922–1980), German footballer
- Nikolaus Jedlicka (born 1987), Austrian poker player known as Niki Jedlicka
- Nikolaus Mayr-Melnhof (born 1978), Austrian racing driver
- Nikolaus Mondt (born 1978), German ice hockey player
- Nikolaus Moser (born 1990), Austrian tennis player
- Nikolaus Ott (born 1945), West German rower known as Niko Ott
- Nikolaus Resch, Austrian sailor

=== Other fields ===
- Count Nikolaus Szécsen von Temerin (1857–1926), Austro-Hungarian diplomat
- Nikolaus Bachler (born 1951), Austrian theater and opera director and actor
- Nikolaus Becker (1809–1845), German writer
- Nikolaus Blome (born 1963), German journalist
- Nikolaus Brender (born 1949), German journalist
- Nikolaus Ehlen (1886–1965), German pacifist teacher
- Nikolaus Federmann (c. 1505 – 1542), German adventurer and conquistador
- Nikolaus Frank (born 1964), Swedish industrial designer
- Nikolaus Friedrich von Thouret (1767–1845), German architect
- Nikolaus Gerbel (c. 1485 – 1560), German humanist, jurist and doctor of both laws
- Nikolaus Geyrhalter (born 1972), Austrian filmmaker
- Nikolaus Gjelsvik (1866–1938), Norwegian jurist
- Nikolaus Gromann (c. 1500 – 1566), German architect
- Nikolaus Katzer (born 1952), German historian
- Nikolaus Knoepffler (born 1962), German philosopher
- Nikolaus Lenau nom de plume of Nikolaus Franz Niembsch Edler von Strehlenau (1802–1850), Austrian poet
- Nikolaus Meyer-Landrut (born 1960), German diplomat
- Nikolaus Paryla (born 1939), Austrian actor and stage director
- Nikolaus Pevsner (1902–1983), British historian
- Nikolaus Senn (1926–2014), Swiss jurist, economist and banker
- Nikolaus Stanec (born 1968), Austrian chess master
- Nikolaus von Halem (1905–1944), German resistance fighter
- Nikolaus von Jeroschin (ca.1290 – 1341), German historian
- Nikolaus von Üxküll-Gyllenband (1877–1944), German businessman
- Nikolaus Wachsmann (born 1971), German historian
- Nikolaus Zmeskall (1759–1833), Hungarian official

== Middle name ==
- Andreas Nikolaus Lauda (1949–2019), Austrian Formula One driver known as Niki Lauda
- Christian Nikolaus Eberlein (1720–1788), German historical painter
- Dietrich Nikolaus Winkel (1777–1826), German inventor
- Franz Nikolaus Finck (1867–1910), German philologist
- Franz Nikolaus Novotny (1743–1773), Austrian organist and composer
- Friedrich Wilhelm Nikolaus Karl (1831–1888), German Emperor
- Georg Nikolaus von Nissen (1761–1826), Danish diplomat and historian
- Gustav Nikolaus Tiedemann (1808–1849), German revolutionary
- Joseph Nikolaus de Vins (1732–1798), Austrian general
- Johann Nikolaus Forkel (1749–1818), German musician, musicologist and music theorist
- Johann Nikolaus Götz (1721–1781), German poet
- Johann Nikolaus Hanff (1663–1711), German organist and composer
- Johann Nikolaus von Hontheim (1701–1790), German historian and theologian
- Johann Nikolaus Weislinger (1691 – 29 August 1755), German polemical writer
- Johannes Nikolaus Tetens (1736–1807), German-Danish philosopher
- Johann Nikolaus Stupanus (1542–1621), Swiss physician
- Niels Nikolaus Falck (1784–1850), Danish jurist and historian
- Paul Nikolaus Cossmann (1869–1942), German journalist
- Simon Nikolaus Euseb von Montjoye-Hirsingen (1693–1775), German Prince-Bishop of Basel
- Wilhelm Nikolaus Suksdorf (1850–1932), German botanist

== See also ==
- Nikolaus (disambiguation)
- Nickolaus
- Nicolaus
- Niklaus (name)
