= Nicklas =

Nicklas is a given name and surname. Notable people with the name include the following:

== Given name ==
=== Sports ===
==== Football ====
- Nicklas Bärkroth (born 1992), Swedish footballer
- Nicklas Bergh (born 1982), Swedish footballer
- Nicklas Carlsson (born 1979), Swedish footballer
- Nicklas Dannevang (born 1990), Danish footballer
- Nicklas Bendtner (born 1988), Danish footballer
- Nicklas Halse (born 1997), Danish footballer
- Nicklas Helenius (born 1991), Danish footballer
- Nicklas Højlund (born 1990), Danish footballer
- Nicklas Strunck (born 1999), Danish footballer
- Nicklas Maripuu (born 1992), Swedish footballer
- Nicklas Mouritsen (born 1995), Danish footballer
- Nicklas Pedersen (born 1987), Danish footballer
- Nicklas Shipnoski (born 1998), German footballer
- Nicklas Svendsen (born 1986), Danish footballer

==== Hockey ====
- Nicklas Bäckström (born 1987) Swedish ice hockey player
- Nicklas Dahlberg (born 1985), Swedish ice hockey
- Nicklas Danielsson (born 1984), Swedish ice hockey player
- Nicklas Grossmann (born 1985), Swedish ice hockey player
- Nicklas Heinerö (born 1991), Swedish ice hockey player
- Nicklas Jadeland (born 1986), Swedish ice hockey player
- Nicklas Jensen (born 1993), Danish ice hockey player
- Nicklas Johansson (born 1984), Swedish ice hockey player
- Nicklas Lasu (born 1989), Swedish ice hockey player
- Nicklas Lidström (born 1970), Swedish ice hockey player
- Nicklas Strid (born 1994), Swedish ice hockey player

==== Racing ====
- Nicklas Nielsen (born 1997), Danish racing driver
- Nicklas Porsing (born 1993), Danish speedway rider

==== Tennis ====
- Nicklas Kulti (born 1971), Swedish tennis player
- Nicklas Utgren (born 1969), Swedish tennis player

==== Other sports ====
- Nicklas Holm (born 1981), Danish sailor
- Nicklas Mathiasen (born 1991), Danish badminton player
- Nicklas Wiberg (born 1985), Swedish decathlete

=== Other fields ===
- Nicklas Barker (born 1969), Swedish musician
- Nicklas Nygren (born 1983), Swedish video game developer
- Nicklas Pedersen (Mister World) (born 1990), Danish carpenter, model and male pageant winner
- Nicklas Söderblom (born 1968), Swedish personal trainer, actor, and author

== Middle name ==
- Karl Nicklas Gustavsson (1972), Swedish composer

== Surname ==
- Charlie Nicklas (born 1930), English footballer
- Danny Nicklas (born 1991), English rugby league footballer
- Tobias Nicklas (born 1967), German scholar of religion
- William H. Nicklas (1866–1960), American architect

== See also ==
- Nickolas
- Niclas
- Niklas (name)
- Nicklaus (surname)
