= Nichlas =

Nichlas is a masculine given name. Notable people with this name include the following:

- Nichlas Falk (born 1971), Swedish ice hockey player
- Nichlas Hardt (born 1988), Danish ice hockey player
- Nichlas Rohde (born 1992), Danish footballer.
- Nichlas Torp (born 1989), Swedish ice hockey player
- Nichlas Vilsmark (born 1973), Danish florist

== See also ==
- Niclas
- Nicholas
- Nicklas (name)
