= Strid =

Strid may refer to one of several things:

- The Strid, a stretch of the River Wharfe, Yorkshire, England
- Strid (band), a black metal band from Norway
- Strid (comic strip), a comic series by Danish cartoonist Jakob Martin Strid
- Little Strid, a character in children's television series Roger and the Rottentrolls

== People ==
- Arne Strid (born 1943), botanist
- Björn Strid (born 1978), rock vocalist
- Elisabet Strid (born 1976), Swedish opera singer
- Jakob Martin Strid, Danish cartoonist
- Jan Paul Strid (1947–2018), Swedish toponymist
- Justus Strid (born 1987), Danish figure skater
- Nicklas Strid (born 1994), Swedish ice hockey player
- Raymond Strid (born 1956), Swedish jazz drummer
