= Les Robson =

English footballer (born 1931)

Personal information
- Full name: Charles Leslie Robson
- Date of birth: 1 November 1931
- Place of birth: South Shields, England
- Date of death: April 1988 (aged 56)
- Place of death: Beverley, England
- Height: 5 ft 9 in (1.75 m)
- Position: Left winger

Youth career
- –: North Hull Juniors
- 1948–1950: Hull City

Senior career*
Years	Team	Apps	(Gls)
1950–1953	Hull City	3	(1)
1953–1955	Darlington	66	(19)
1955–1956	Liverpool	0	(0)
1956	Crewe Alexandra	14	(2)
1956–19??	Goole Town		
- * Club domestic league appearances and goals

Charles Leslie Robson (1 November 1931 – April 1988) was an English footballer who scored 22 goals from 83 appearances in the Football League playing on the left wing for Hull City, Darlington and Crewe Alexandra. He was on the books of Liverpool, but never played for the first team, and also played non-league football for clubs including Goole Town.

== Life and career ==
Robson was born in South Shields, County Durham. He attended Hull Grammar School and played football for North Hull Juniors, from where he joined Hull City in 1948. In the 1949–50 season, Robson played for the East Riding of Yorkshire team in the county youth championships; the Hull Daily Mail remarked on his speed and clever ball-play. The "wiry and shrewd" Robson also appeared in the Northern Intermediate League's first representative match, against the Lancashire League. In March 1950, he was rewarded with a "well-earned promotion" from Hull City Juniors to the "A" team, playing in the Yorkshire League, and the following season made his first appearance for the reserves.

He scored freely in the Midland League, and the Yorkshire Evening Post predicted his inclusion in the first team for the November 1951 Second Division match against Birmingham City in place of Charlie Nicklas, who had himself only recently made his senior debut. He was not selected for that match, but after Hull's attempt to sign former Scotland international winger Jimmy Delaney fell through, Robson came into the team to face Nottingham Forest a fortnight later. Hull lost 4–1, but Robson kept his place for the next game, a 2–1 defeat at Brentford. He scored his side's goal, Hull's first from open play in five games, despite intending his left-wing cross as a centre for Nicklas. Neither youngster was retained for the next match. Robson stood in for the ageing Raich Carter for the Christmas Day visit to Blackburn Rovers, another defeat, but that was his last appearance for Hull.

Both Robson and Nicklas signed for Third Division North club Darlington in the summer of 1953. Robson spent two seasons with the club, and scored 19 league goals. He began his Darlington career brightly, with the opening goal in an eventful 2–2 draw away to Bradford in September 1953, a shot via the foot of the post to secure a 3–3 draw at York City two weeks later, a goal in a 1–1 draw at Carlisle United in October and another the following Saturday to help Darlington beat Accrington Stanley 4–1. He spent two seasons with the club, scoring 19 league goals from 66 matches, and his performances attracted the attention of Second Division club Liverpool. He signed in the summer of 1955, and scored on his debut for their reserve team in the Central League, but never made a first-team appearance. In January 1956, he moved back to the Third Division with Crewe Alexandra, with whom he finished the season, scoring twice in 14 league games, and then dropped into non-league football with Goole Town.

Robson died in April 1988 in Beverley, which was then in Humberside.
