= Niklaus =

Niklaus may refer to:

- Niklaus (name)
- Feldbrunnen-St. Niklaus
- St. Niklaus

== See also ==
- Nicklaus (name)
- Nicholas (name)
- Nikolaus (disambiguation)
