= Niklaus (name) =

Niklaus is a masculine given name and surname. Niklaus comes from the Greek word nikolaos (νικόλαος), meaning victory of the people. It’s a variant of the likewise Greek-origin given name Nicholas.

The traditional short forms of this name are Nik and Klaus, being primarily used in Switzerland and Germany.

Notable people with the name include the following:

== Given name ==
- Niklaus Aeschbacher (1917–1995), Swiss composer and conductor
- Niklaus Bütler (1786–1854), Swiss painter
- Niklaus Dachselhofer (1595–1670), Swiss politician
- Niklaus Franz von Bachmann (1740–1831), Swiss general
- Niklaus Friedrich von Steiger (1729–1799), Swiss politician
- Niklaus Gerber (1850–1914), Swiss dairy chemist
- Niklaus Grunwald, American biologist and plant pathologist
- Niklaus Brantschen (born 1937), Swiss Jesuit, Zen master
- Niklaus Leuenberger (1615–1653), Swiss peasant
- Niklaus Manuel Deutsch (c. 1484–1530), Swiss artist
- Niklaus Meienberg (1940–1993), Swiss writer and investigative journalist
- Niklaus Niggeler (1817–1872), Swiss politician
- Niklaus Pfluger (born 1958), Swiss Catholic priest
- Niklaus Riggenbach (1817–1899), Swiss inventor, engineer and locomotive builder
- Niklaus Schilling (1944–2016), Swiss film director, cinematographer, and screenwriter
- Niklaus Schurtenberger (born 1968), Swiss equestrian
- Niklaus Stump (1920–2005), Swiss cross-country and Nordic combined skier
- Niklaus Troxler (born 1947), Swiss graphic designer
- Niklaus Weckmann (c. 1481–1526), German sculptor
- Niklaus Wirth (1934–2024), Swiss computer scientist

== Middle name ==
- Franz Niklaus König (1765–1832), Swiss painter

== Surname ==
- André Niklaus (born 1981), German decathlete
- Stephan Niklaus (born 1958), Swiss decathlete
- Mandy Niklaus (born 1956), East German fencer

== Fictional characters ==
- Brad Niklaus from Sunset Beach
- Niklaus “Klaus” Mikaelson from The Vampire Diaries and The Originals

== See also ==
- Niklaus (disambiguation)
- Niclaus
- Nicklaus (name)
- Nikolaus (given name)
