= Nikolaus (disambiguation) =

Nicholas is a male given name.

Nikolaus may also refer to:

== Places ==
- Church of St. Nikolaus, Lockenhaus, Austrian church
- St. Nikolaus parish church (Pfronten), German church
- Nikolaus Lenau High School, German high school

== People ==
- Nikolaus (given name)

== See also ==
- Niklaus (disambiguation)
- Nicolaus, a given name
- Nikolaos, a given name
