= Katzer =

Katzer is a surname. Notable people with the surname include:

- Frederick Katzer (1844–1903), American Roman Catholic archbishop
- Friedrich Katzer (1861–1925), Austrian geologist and mineralogist
- Hans Katzer (1919–1996), German politician, minister for labour and social affaires
- Markus Katzer (born 1979), Austrian footballer
- Karl August Katzer( 1822–1904), Sorbian composer and conductor
- Nikolaus Katzer (born 1952), German historian
- Georg Katzer (1935–2019), German composer

== See also ==
- Jacobsen v. Katzer
