= Mondt =

Mondt is a surname. Notable people with the surname include:

- Bill Mondt (1934–2023), American football player and coach
- Erv Mondt (born 1938), American football coach
- Nikolaus Mondt (born 1978), German ice hockey player
- Toots Mondt (1894–1976), American professional wrestler and promoter
