= Joseph Niklaus Bütler =

Swiss painter

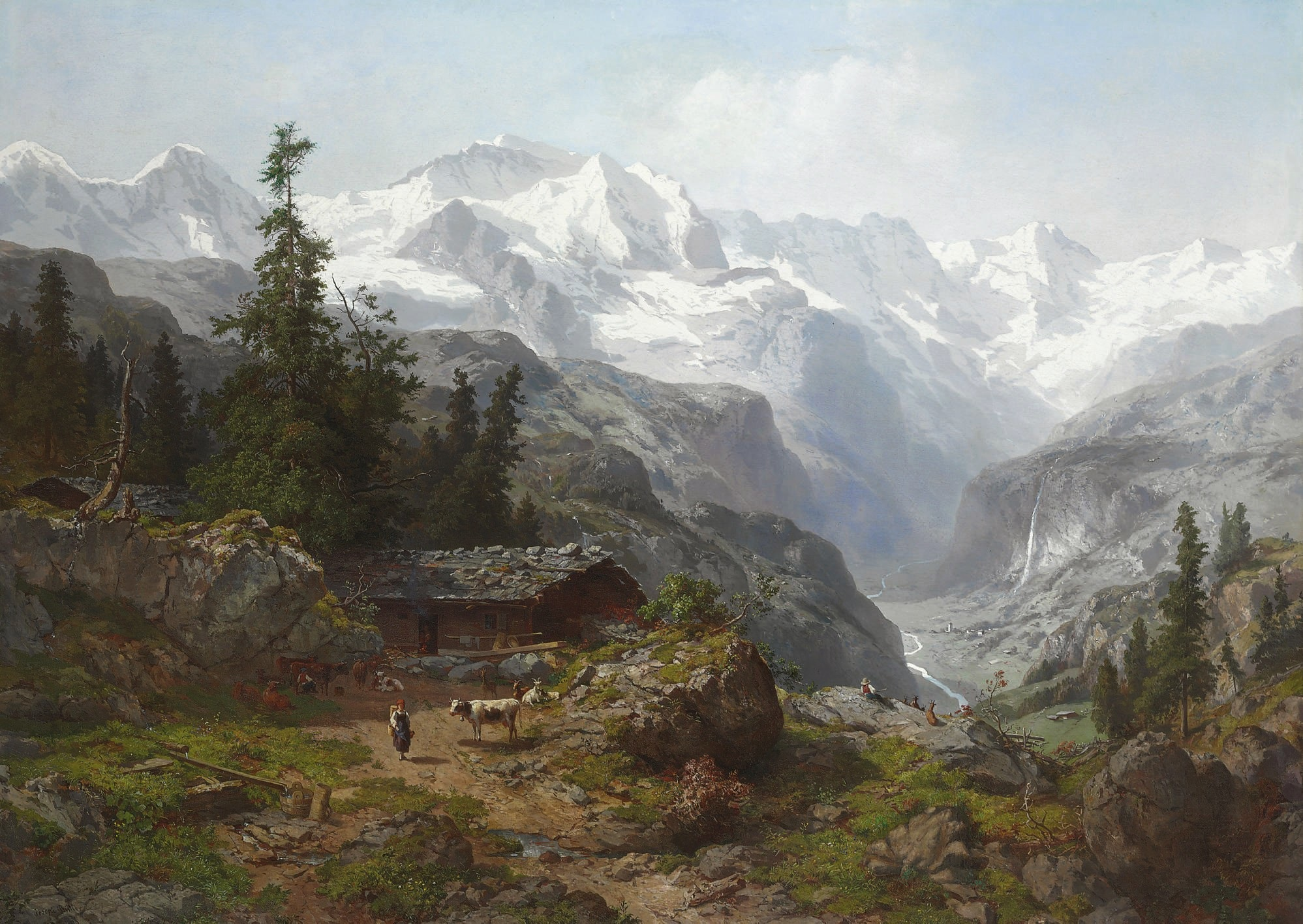
View of the Lauterbrunnen Valley with Eiger, Mönch and Jungfrau

Joseph Niklaus Bütler, born Josephus Nicolaus Gallus Bütler (16 October 1822, Küssnacht – 20 January 1885, Düsseldorf) was a Swiss landscape painter; associated with the Düsseldorfer Malerschule.

== Life and work ==
He was the son of Niklaus Bütler, an artist, and his wife Anna Maria née Trutmann. He received his first art lessons from his father. He began painting around 1840, after his family had taken up residence in Lucerne.

From 1852 to 1853, he attended classes taught by the landscape painter, Johann Wilhelm Schirmer, at the Kunstakademie Düsseldorf. In 1858, following a brief return to Lucerne, to resolve some financial issues, he settled in Düsseldorf. For a short time, he shared his home with his brother Anton, who was also an artist.

He devoted himself exclusively to landscape painting; presenting scenes from the Swiss Alps, rendered in the popular Heroic style. He was also influenced by the writings of Jean-Jacques Rousseau, who spoke of unadulterated nature as a refuge of freedom. Later, he came under the influence of the simpler style employed by the Barbizon school.

In 1868, he married Sophie Antonia Jungheim, a sister of his friend, the painter Carl Jungheim. From 1859 to 1884, he was a member of the progressive artists' association "Malkasten" (Paintbox). He also took part in exhibitions presented by the Kunstverein für die Rheinlande und Westfalen, and continued to have showings in Switzerland.

== Sources ==
- "Bütler, Josephus Nicolaus Gallus". SIKART Lexicon on art in Switzerland.
- "Bütler, Joseph Nicolaus". In: Friedrich von Boetticher. Malerwerke des neunzehnten Jahrhunderts. Beitrag zur Kunstgeschichte. Vol.I, Dresden 1895, pg.151.
- "Bütler, Joseph Nikolaus", In: Allgemeines Lexikon der Bildenden Künstler von der Antike bis zur Gegenwart, Vol. 5: Brewer–Carlingen, E. A. Seemann, Leipzig, 1911 (Online)
