= Buxtehude =

Hanseatic City of Buxtehude Hansestadt Buxtehude Hansestadt Buxthu
- Town
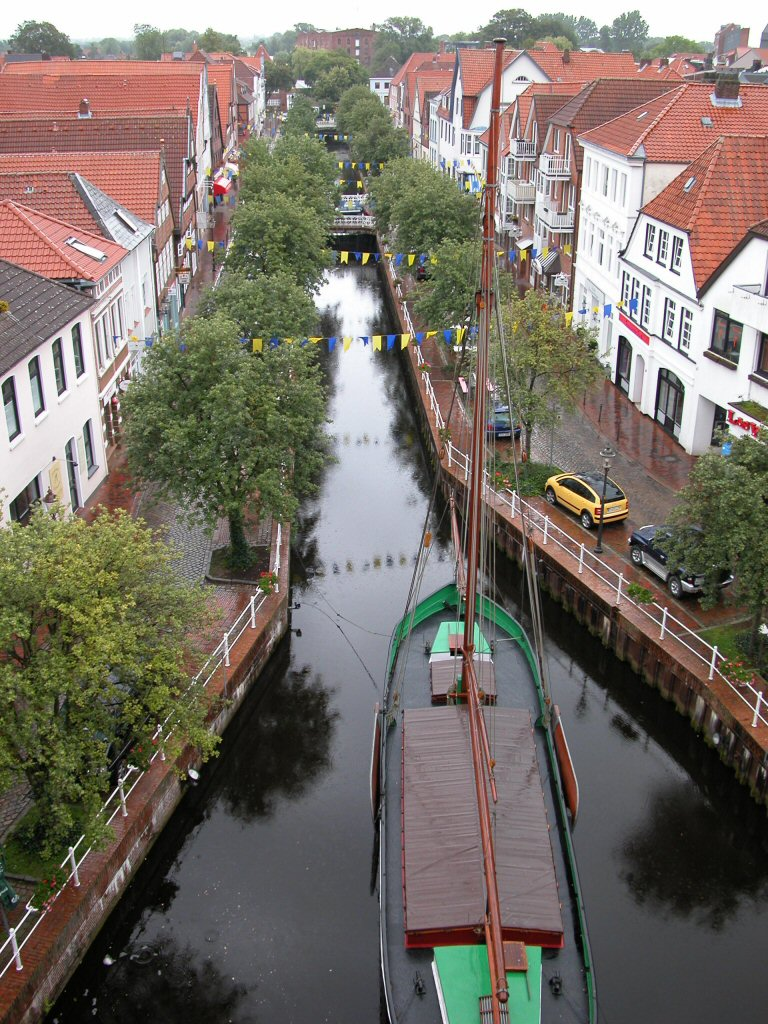

- Coat of arms

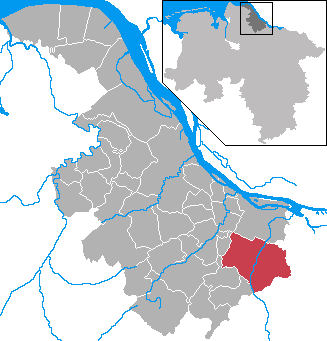
- Location of Hanseatic City of Buxtehude within Stade district
- Interactive map of Hanseatic City of Buxtehude
- Location within Germany Location within Lower Saxony
- Coordinates: 53°28′37″N 9°42′4″E
- Country: Germany
- State: Lower Saxony
- District: Stade
- Subdivisions: 15 districts

Government
  - Mayor (2021–26): Katja Oldenburg-Schmidt (Ind.)

Area
  - Total: 76.69 km^{2} (29.61 sq mi)
- Elevation: 5 m (16 ft)

Population (2025-12-31)
  - Total: 41,103
  - Density: 536.0/km^{2} (1,388/sq mi)
- Time zone: UTC+01:00 (CET)
  - Summer (DST): UTC+02:00 (CEST)
- Postal codes: 21614
- Dialling codes: 04161, 04163, 04168
- Vehicle registration: STD
- Website: www.buxtehude.de

Buxtehude (German pronunciation: [bʊkstəˈhuːdə]; Low German: Buxthu, pronounced [bʊkstˈhu]), officially the Hanseatic City of Buxtehude (German: Hansestadt Buxtehude), is a town on the Este River in Northern Germany, belonging to the district of Stade in Lower Saxony. It is part of the Hamburg Metropolitan Region and attached to the city's S-Bahn rapid transit network. Buxtehude is a medium-sized town and the second largest municipality in the Stade district (Landkreis). It lies on the southern border of the Altes Land in close proximity to the city-state of Hamburg. To the west lie the towns of Horneburg and Stade and to the south there are a number of incorporated villages featuring mostly upscale housing; e.g., Ottensen and Apensen.

== History ==
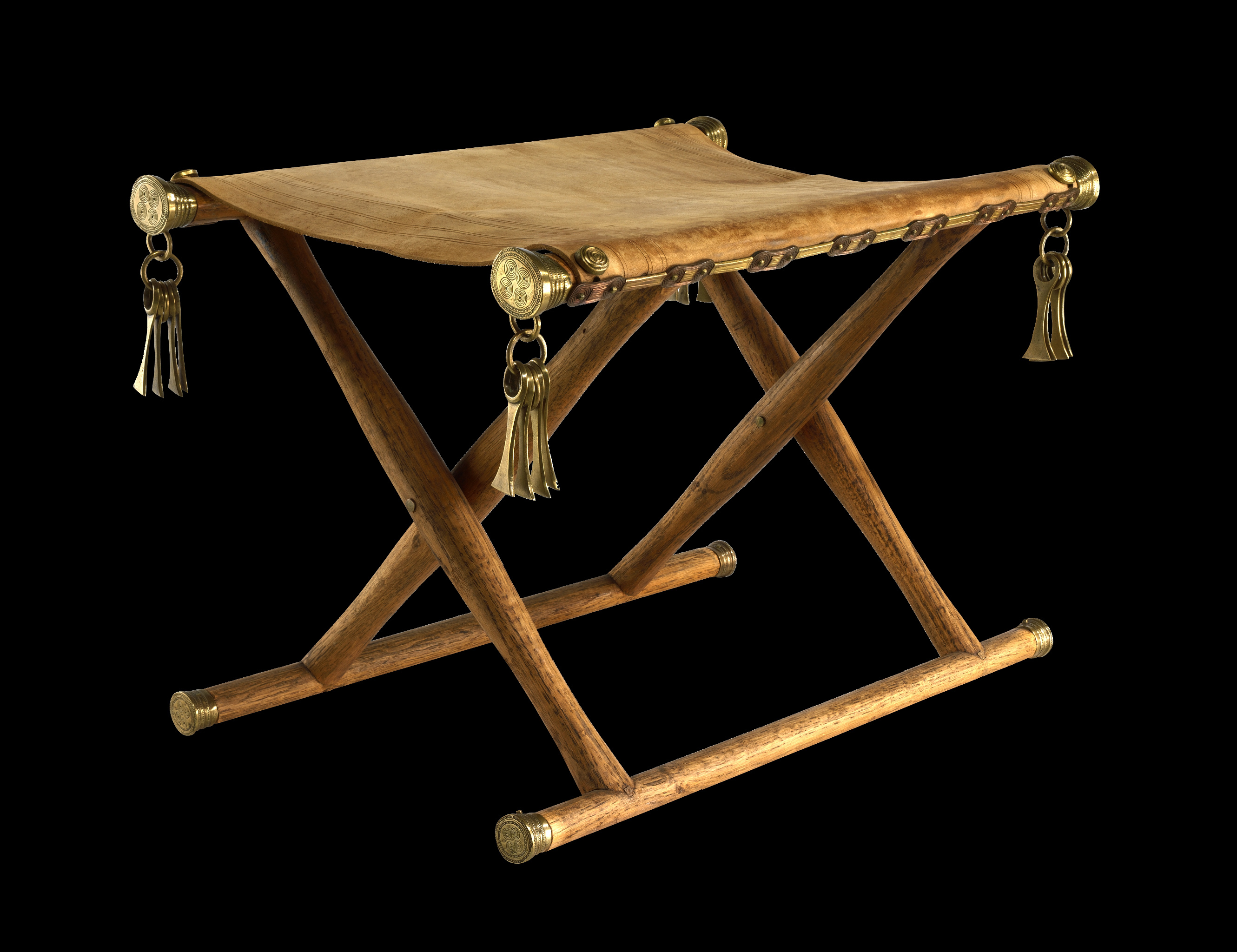
Reconstruction of the Daensen folding chair

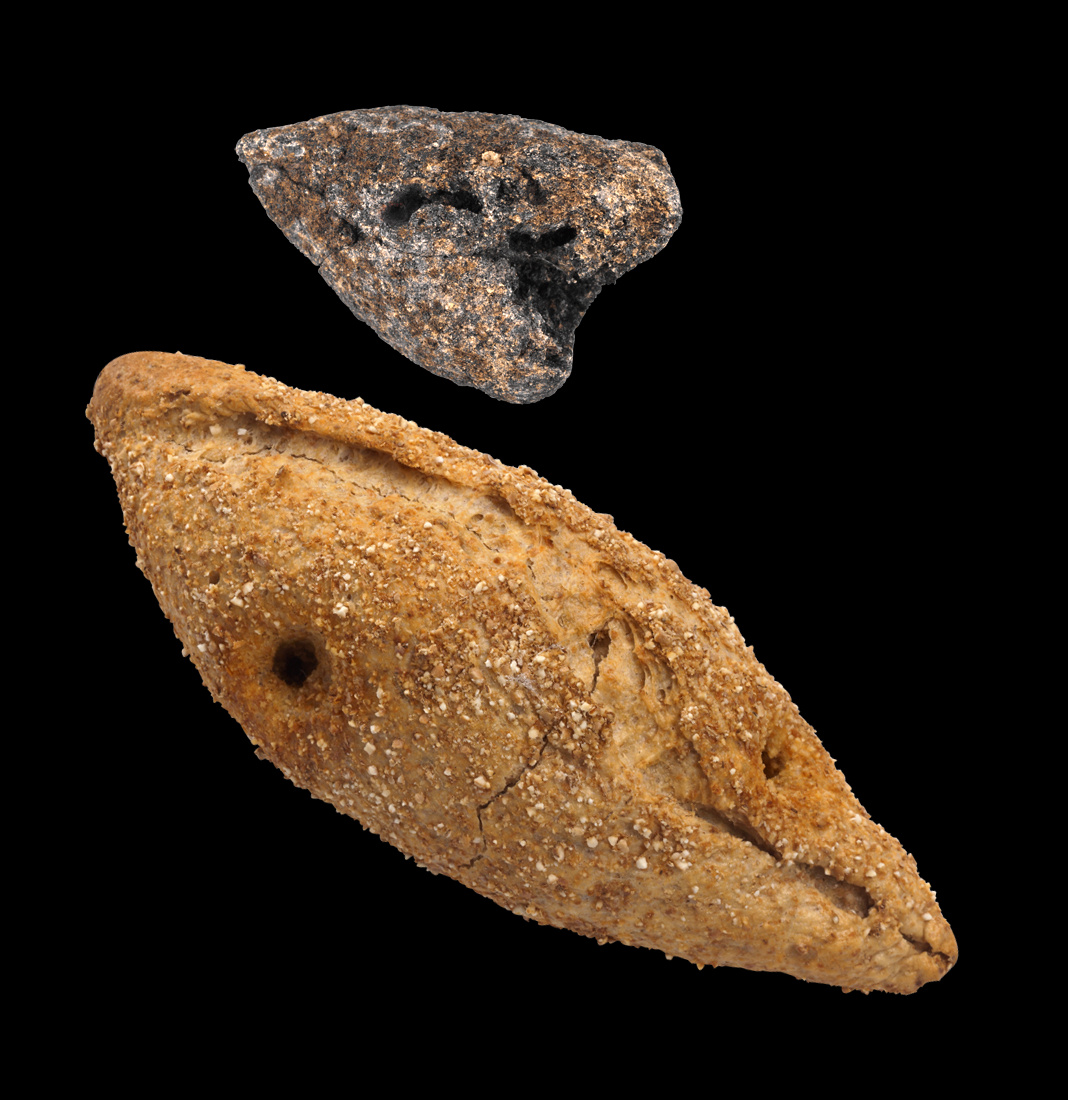
The Ovelgönne bread roll (top) with reconstruction (below)

Early signs of settlements are the Daensen folding chair from a Bronze Age tumulus near Daensen and the Ovelgönne bread roll from the Pre-Roman Iron Age of Northern Europe, which was found in a loam mine in Ovelgönne.

A settlement by the Este river is first recorded in 959. The manor of "Buochstadon" was given to the Abbey of Magdeburg. Soon a wharf, "Hude", is established. In 1135 the settlement is mentioned as "Buchstadihude" in a reference to the success of trade from the quay. In 1180 the Duchy of Saxony, to which "Buchstadihude" belonged, was conquered and dissolved. Buxtehude became part of the Prince-Archbishopric of Bremen, newly upgraded to imperial immediacy it became one of the many successor states of the Duchy of Saxony. Nevertheless, ecclesiastically Buxtehude remained part of the Diocese of Verden until Catholicism was overthrown in the Reformation with that diocese remaining vacant since 1644. In 1197 two royal settlers founded a Benedictine monastery near the village. Owing to the fertile soil and a partial participation in the saline of Lüneburg wealth and population increased. In 1280 the prince-archbishop Giselbert of Bremen ordered the settlement to be protected by defensive walls and fortifications including 5 zwingers, 7 peels and 3 town gates. In 1328 the town hall is mentioned for the first time and the settlement is granted full town privileges, based on the law of Hamburg. By now "Buxtehude" was self-governing and rapidly growing into a centre of trade. In 1485 the immensely wealthy "Master Halepaghen", cousin and tutor of the burgomaster of Hamburg, died and donated his assets to the town for scholarships and charitable purposes. In 1542 the town council of Buxtehude adopted Lutheranism within its domain.

In the 1600s Hanseatic trade declined with the most important area of trade being in cattle. Apart from Stade, Buxtehude was the only crossing point on the Elbe river. In 1645 Buxtehude surrendered to the Swedish army and lost its independence. Trade and population decrease dramatically. In 1648 the Prince-Archbishopric of Bremen was converted to the Duchy of Bremen, which was first ruled in personal union by the Swedes and from 1715 on by the Hanoverian Crown. In 1769 the monastery was demolished due to secularization.

In 1823 the Duchy was abolished and its territory became part of the Stade Region. In 1837 the link road through the town reanimates business and trade. 1845 is dominated by industrial boom with a paper factory being installed on the former cloister ground.

In 1945 the population grew to 14,000. Much living space in Hamburg was in ruins and people fled to the suburbs and surrounding towns and villages such as Buxtehude. In 1958 Buxtehude became part of the plan for the reconstruction of Hamburg after the war and thus was heavily funded by the government. Lower Saxony incorporates 9 neighbouring villages into the town in 1972 changing the structure of Buxtehude and creating a cluster of more than 30,000 inhabitants. In 1983 the old part of town was pedestrianized. In 1985 town twinning with Blagnac (France) is undertaken. In 1990 Ribnitz-Damgarten in the former German Democratic Republic became the second twin town.

== Economy ==
Since 1881 Buxtehude has had its own railroad station on the R50 line between Hamburg and Cuxhaven. In late 2007 this line was added to the rapid transit system of the Hamburg S-Bahn by the HVV.

Since 1928 there has also been a second railroad line crossing Buxtehude, the EVB (Eisenbahn- und Verkehrsbetriebe Elbe-Weser, Zeven) between Hamburg's outermost district and Bremerhaven on the coast of the North Sea. The Este river connects the town to the important Elbe river 9.7 kilometres (6 mi) north. Earlier in history this connection was used to ship goods into the small harbour, which still exists but has become less accessible due to town developments and aggradation.

A major highway, scheduled for completion in 2012, is to connect the town to Hamburg.

In April 2019 the unemployment rate in Buxtehude was 3.8%.

=== Companies ===
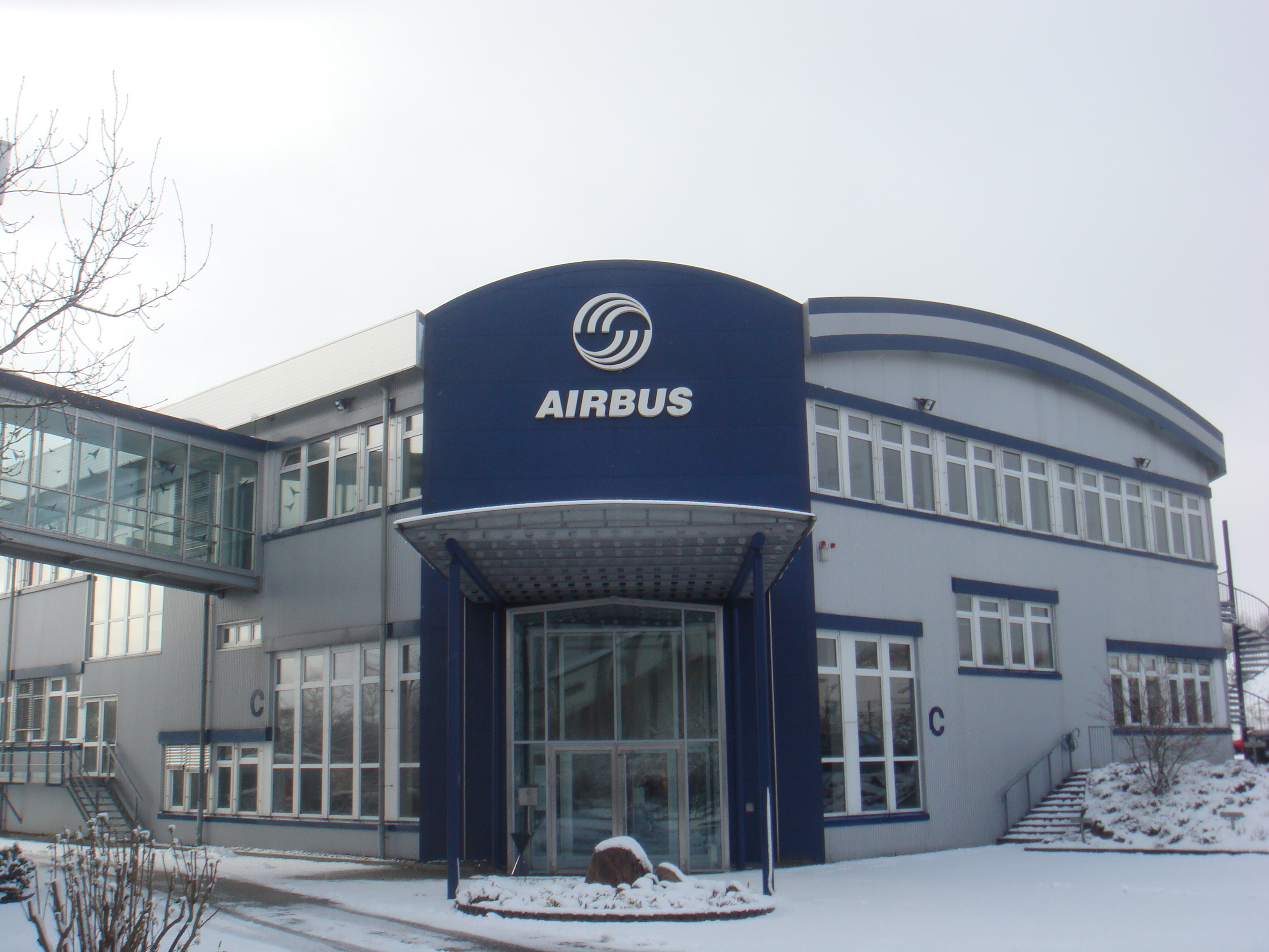
Airbus site at Buxtehude

Several major companies have production sites or headquarters in Buxtehude:

- Airbus Operations GmbH - Cabin Electronics, the commercial aircraft manufacturer
- Unilever, an Anglo-Dutch company in the personal care and food sector.
- KID-Systeme GmbH, a Buxtehude-based supplier for aeroplane cabin electronics
- INTERPANE, a German manufacturer of insulation glass
- Harros Krämerladen, a large German supermarket corporation
- Pioneer Hi-Bred, a subdivision of the US-based chemical producer DuPont, developer and exporter of seeds
- Nord Kalksandsteinwerke, a German producer of lime sand bricks and other building material
- Niederelbe Schifffahrtsgesselleschaft (NSB), German container shipping companies
- implantcast GmbH, German manufacturer of orthopaedic implants, such as artificial hips and knees

== Culture ==
Buxtehude is sometimes called the "Fairytale Capital of the World," an epithet that it shares with Kassel. The tale of "The Hare and the Hedgehog" by the Brothers Grimm is set in this town. Furthermore, the name is used in numerous German tales. And thus some people claim that the town of Buxtehude does not actually exist. The German saying "nach Buxtehude jagen" (literally, "to chase somebody off to Buxtehude") means to exile someone to a far-away place.

=== Museums ===
The Museum of Regional History and Art is located here.

=== Local dialects ===
German and Low Saxon, which is rarely spoken now but can be still heard spoken by older people. Also one of the local high schools Halepaghen-Schule holds a Low German reading contest each school year.

=== Tourism ===
Besides the old part of town, the main church of Sankt Petri (St. Peter) and the Zwinger are also places to visit. The Altes Land adjacent to Buxtehude and the close Elbe river serve as locations for a bicycle tour or a long hike. Buxtehude can also be used as a hub for tours to the nearby cities of Hamburg and Bremen.

Buxtehuder Pistennacht

The Pistennacht is an event where bars, restaurants and clubs in the old part of town are open all night long. A stage downtown and some individual places offer live music.

Pfingstmarkt Neukloster

The Pfingstmarkt is a fair in northern Germany along the national highway B73. It is always held on the Christian holiday of Pentecost (Pfingsten) exactly 50 days after Easter close to Buxtehude. It features 135 exhibitors with many rides including a Ferris wheel and bumper cars as well as lottery booths, snack booths and sit-down food locations. In 2004 140,000 visitors flocked to the fair compared to 10,000 in 1904 and 100,000 in the 1970s.

Altstadtfest

Like the Pistennacht, the Altstadtfest (literally, 'old town festival') is held downtown. Every year on the first weekend of June the whole old part of town turns into a party with several stages with live music. Sunday morning the town's biggest flea market is held around the Fleth. For the occasion of Altstadtfest the town is decorated in its municipal colours of blue and yellow.

Weinfest

Vinum is the motto for the annual celebration of wine in old town Buxtehude. For one weekend the town dedicates itself to culture of wine and many booths for wine testing and entertainment open.

Christmas market

Christmas market is held in the month of December in the Altstadt area with the highlight being mulled wine and bratwurst stalls. Various music concerts are also held at the St. Peter's square on the weekend before Christmas.

=== Sport ===
The handball club Buxtehuder SV plays in the women's Bundesliga and have won the DHB-Pokal on two occasions.

== Education ==
- Hochschule 21, a private college with a renowned architecture program.
- Halepaghen Grammar School, local highschool. Holder of the title "School without racism, School with courage", former member in the "Quality Network for Schools" in Lower Saxony, Humanitarian School and rating highest in the county.
- Gymnasium Süd local highschool
- Volkshochschule Buxtehude, community college.
- Malerschule, private art school.
- Berufsbildende Schulen Buxtehude, public secondary schools for the sectors of economics, informatics and electrotechnics.

== Transport ==
Buxtehude is served by the Hamburg S-Bahn with the stations Buxtehude and Neukloster; and by the Bundesstraße 3 and Bundesstraße 73, two federal highways. It is planned to connect Buxtehude to the Autobahn 26 once construction continues.

== Twin towns – sister cities ==
Buxtehude is twinned with:

- Blagnac, France (1985)
- Ribnitz-Damgarten, Germany (1990)

== Notable people ==
- Helga Wex (1924–1986), German politician (CDU)
- Hermann Blumenthal, (DE Wiki) (1903–1941), Germanist and librarian

=== Sport ===
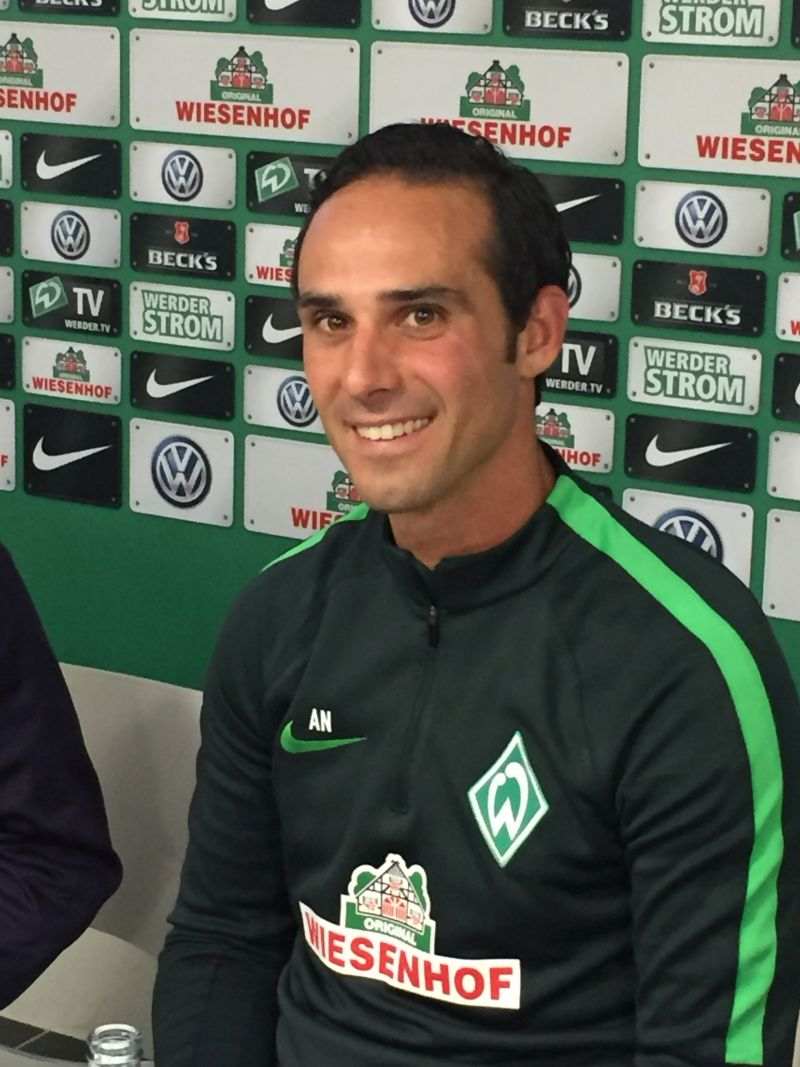
Alexander Nouri, 2016

- Ralf Drecoll (1944–2012). Olympic high jumper
- Stefan Studer (born 1964), footballer and functionary, played about 280 games
- Michael Stolle (born 1974), athlete and Olympic pole vaulter
- Nils Winter (born 1977), long jumper
- Alexander Nouri (born 1979), footballer and coach, played 326 games
- Nico Matern (born 1992), footballer, played over 230 games

=== Associated with Buxtehude ===
- Nicolaus Rohlfs (1695–1750), mathematician and astronomer, from 1731 writing and teaching arithmetic at the public Latin school in Buxtehude
- Heinrich Brüning, (DE Wiki) (1836–1920), 1864–1871 mayor of Buxtehude
- Arnold Lyongrün (1871–1935), academic painter, teacher at the Staatliche Kunstgewerbeschule Hamburg, lived in Buxtehude
- Wilhelm Beiglböck (1905–1963), physician convicted in the Doctors' trial, from 1952 chief physician of the Buxtehude hospital, died here
- Jürgen Kurbjuhn (1940–2014), footballer, played 318 games; died here
- Stefanie Melbeck (born 1977), handball player
