= Junker =

German noble honorific

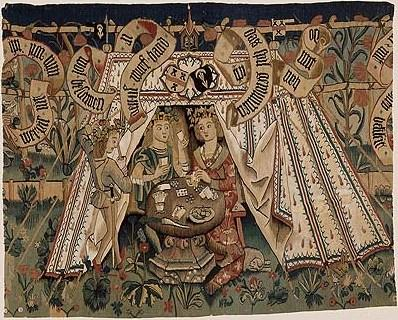
The renaissance humanist Nikolaus Meyer zum Pfeil, of the Swiss Meyer zum Pfeil family, held the honorific Junker

Junker (Danish: Junker, German: Junker, Dutch: Jonkheer, Norwegian: Junker, Swedish: Junker, Georgian: იუნკერი, Iunkeri) is a noble honorific, derived from Middle High German Juncherre, meaning 'young nobleman' or otherwise 'young lord' (derivation of jung and Herr). The term is traditionally used throughout the German-speaking and Scandinavian parts of Europe. It was also used in the Russian Empire due to Baltic German influence, up until the Russian Revolution. The term is currently still in use by the Georgian Defense Forces for student officers of the National Defence Academy.

== Honorific title ==
In Brandenburg, the Junker was originally one of the members of the higher Edelfrei (immediate) nobility without or before the accolade of knighthood. But the word evolved into a general denotation of a young or lesser nobleman, sometimes politically insignificant, understood as what in England is called a "country squire".

Martin Luther disguised himself as "Junker Jörg" at the Wartburg; he would later mock Henry VIII of England as "Juncker Heintz".

As part of the nobility, many Junker families only had prepositions such as von or zu before their family names, without formal titles, while some had no such prepositions.The abbreviation of the title was Jkr., most often placed before the given name and titles, for example: Jkr. Heinrich von Hohenberg. The female equivalent Junkfrau (Jkfr.) was used only sporadically. In some cases, the honorific Jkr. was also used for Freiherren (barons) and Grafen (counts).

Junker (and its cognates) was traditionally used in the above sense of an honorific of nobility mostly in Prussia and eastern Germany; in other German-speaking lands, it was not used or else had different meanings; in Swiss German dialects, for instance, it meant a farm worker.

The title today survives in its honorific meaning in the Netherlands and Belgium, in the Dutch form Jonkheer. The Hoge Raad van Adel (High Council of Nobility) in the Netherlands defines it as an honorific predicate, and not a title.

== Germany ==
In modern Prussian history, the term became popularly used as a loosely defined synecdoche for the landed nobility (particularly of so-called East Elbia) who controlled almost all of the land and government, or by extension, the Prussian estate owners regardless of noble status. With the formation of the German Empire in 1871, the Junkers dominated the central German government and the Prussian military. A leading representative was Prince Otto von Bismarck. "The Junkers" of Prussia were often contrasted with the elites of the western and southern states in Germany, such as the city-republic of Hamburg (which had no nobility) or Catholic states like Bavaria, in which the "Junker class" of Prussia was often viewed with contempt. After World War I, the junker class, which had formed much of the officer corps of the Wehrmacht and whose prominent member President and former General Paul von Hindenburg had appointed Hitler chancellor in 1933, was often blamed for Prussian militarism, the rise of the Nazis and World War II. As a consequence, a land reform in the Soviet Occupation Zone which had the goal of collectivization along Soviet lines was justified in propaganda as a strike against the Junker class with the slogan "Junkerland in Bauernhand" ("Junker lands in peasant hands").

Junker has also been used in a military context in the German armed forces, such as in the rank of Fahnenjunker.

== Scandinavia ==
In Denmark, the term Junker connotes a young lord, originally the son of a medieval duke or count, but is also a term for a member of the privileged landowner class, and can be considered the equivalent of the gentry. Before 1375 the honorific was also suitable for Danish royal sons. It was also used in the title Kammerjunker within the royal household, the equivalent of the French valet de chambre, a position usually given to young noble men in the service of a princely rank person at the court. A Kammerjunker was ranked below a chamberlain, but above a chamber page.

The title of junker is also used within military roles, most notably in the Swedish military, with the rank of fanjunkare and its derivates (the equivalent of a colour sergeant).

== See also ==
- Danish nobility
- Dutch nobility
- Gentry
- German nobility
- Jonkheer
- Yonkers
