= Alexander Nouri =

German footballer and manager

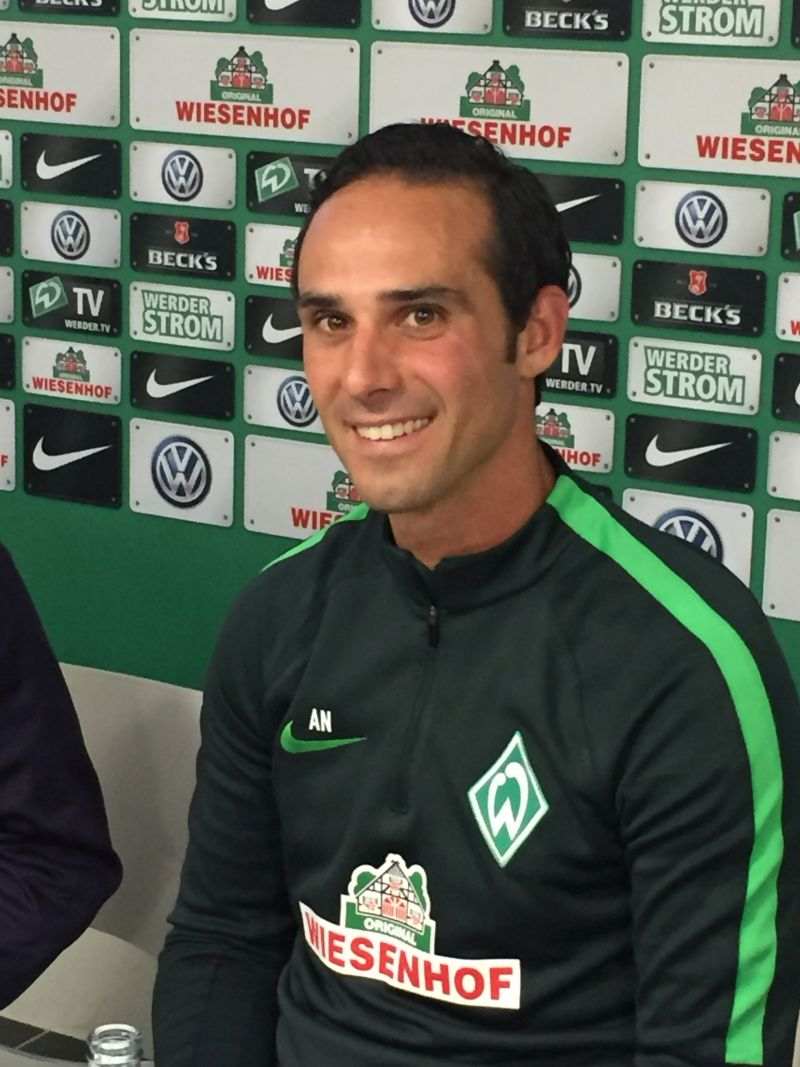
- Nouri in 2016

Personal information
- Date of birth: 20 August 1979 (age 47)
- Place of birth: Buxtehude, West Germany
- Height: 1.78 m (5 ft 10 in)
- Position: Attacking midfielder

Youth career
- TSV Altkloster
- Buxtehuder SV
- –1994: Vorwärts/Wacker 04 Billstedt
- 1994–1998: Werder Bremen

Senior career*
Years	Team	Apps	(Gls)
1998–2001	Werder Bremen II	70	(8)
1999–2001	Werder Bremen	0	(0)
1999	→ Seattle Sounders (loan)	8	(0)
2001–2004	KFC Uerdingen	89	(8)
2004–2008	VfL Osnabrück	85	(8)
2007	→ VfL Osnabrück II	3	(1)
2008–2010	Holstein Kiel	41	(5)
2009–2010	Holstein Kiel II	4	(1)
2010–2011	VfB Oldenburg	26	(5)
Total		326	(36)

Managerial career
- 2013–2014: VfB Oldenburg
- 2014–2016: Werder Bremen II
- 2016–2017: Werder Bremen
- 2018: FC Ingolstadt
- 2019–2020: Hertha BSC (assistant)
- 2020: Hertha BSC (interim)
- 2021: United States (assistant)
- 2021–2022: Kavala
- * Club domestic league appearances and goals

Alexander Nouri (Persian: آلکساندر نوری, Persian pronunciation: [nuːriː]; born 20 August 1979) is a German former footballer and manager. He played professionally for 14 years with Werder Bremen, Seattle Sounders, KFC Uerdingen, VfL Osnabrück, Holstein Kiel and VfB Oldenburg.

== Managerial career ==
In November 2011, Nouri became part of the coaching staff of VfB Oldenburg. He then became manager of the club between 22 April 2013 and 30 June 2014. He managed the last seven matches of the 2012–13 season and finished with a record of three wins, two draws, and two losses. After the following season, Oldenburg finished in third place with a record of 17 wins, nine draws, and eight losses. In July 2014, Nouri became part of the coaching staff at Werder Bremen serving as an intermediary between first team coach Robin Dutt and reserve team coach Viktor Skrypnyk.

On 25 October 2014, Nouri succeeded Skrypnyk as manager of the reserve team while Skrypnyk became manager of the first team after the dismissal of Dutt.

He was appointed as the head coach of the first team of Bundesliga side Werder Bremen on 18 September 2016. After first serving on an interim basis, Nouri was handed the job permanently on 2 October 2016, with his contract running through to the end of the 2016–17 campaign. Under the helm of Nouri, Bremen escaped the relegation battle and went in contention for European football. In May 2017, his contract with the club was extended. On 30 October 2017, Nouri was dismissed by the club.

He was hired by FC Ingolstadt on 24 September 2018. Two months later, he was sacked.

On 11 February 2020, he took over Hertha BSC on an interim basis after his stint as assistant manager under Jürgen Klinsmann. He was replaced by Bruno Labbadia on 9 April 2020.

== Personal life ==
Nouri's father is an Iranian native who was born in the city of Rasht. His mother is German. He is married and has two children, a daughter, Minoo and a son, Ariyan. He is a dual citizen of Germany and Iran.

Since January 2026, he has managed three McDonald's restaurants in Herzogenrath.

== Managerial record ==
As of 26 March 2022

Team		From	To	Record					
Team		From	To	M	W	D	L	Win %	Ref.
VfB Oldenburg	(Germany)	22 April 2013	30 June 2014	45	23	11	11	51.11	
Werder Bremen II	(Germany)	26 October 2014	18 September 2016	68	26	18	24	38.24	
Werder Bremen	(Germany)	19 September 2016	30 October 2017	43	15	11	17	34.88	
FC Ingolstadt	(Germany)	24 September 2018	26 November 2018	8	0	3	5	0.00	
Hertha BSC	(Germany)	11 February 2020	9 April 2020	4	1	2	1	25.00	
Kavala	(Greece)	10 December 2021	26 March 2022	15	3	7	5	20.00	
Total				183	68	52	63	37.16	
