= Frank Etc. =

Swedish design company

Frank Etc. AB is a Swedish design company specialized in industrial design and graphic design. It was founded in Stockholm in 1994 by the industrial designer Nikolaus Frank and the graphic designer Cecilia Frank.

Products designed by Frank Etc. often have a high technological content and a clear design. The company has been active both in Sweden and internationally, for instance in cooperation with the design company IDEO and with companies in Asia, especially Hong Kong.

Over the years, Frank Etc. has received a number of awards and recognitions, such as several Good Design Awards, several Excellent Swedish Design-awards, the international design prices Industrial Design Excellence Award IDEA and the iF Award for Good Industrial Design. Awards and recognitions have also been received in a number of international design competitions, such as the LG Electronics, the Design The Future International Competition and the Yamaha Audio System International Design Competition (Yamaha Pro Audio).

Frank Etc. is represented in the permanent collection of the Swedish National Art Museum (Nationalmuseum), represented with several products in the exhibition Design: Stockholm at the Stockholms Stadsmuseum has also had a separate exhibition at the National Museum of Science and Technology (Swedish National Museum of Science and Technology) in Stockholm.

== See also ==
- Industrial design
