= Anton Bütler =

Swiss painter

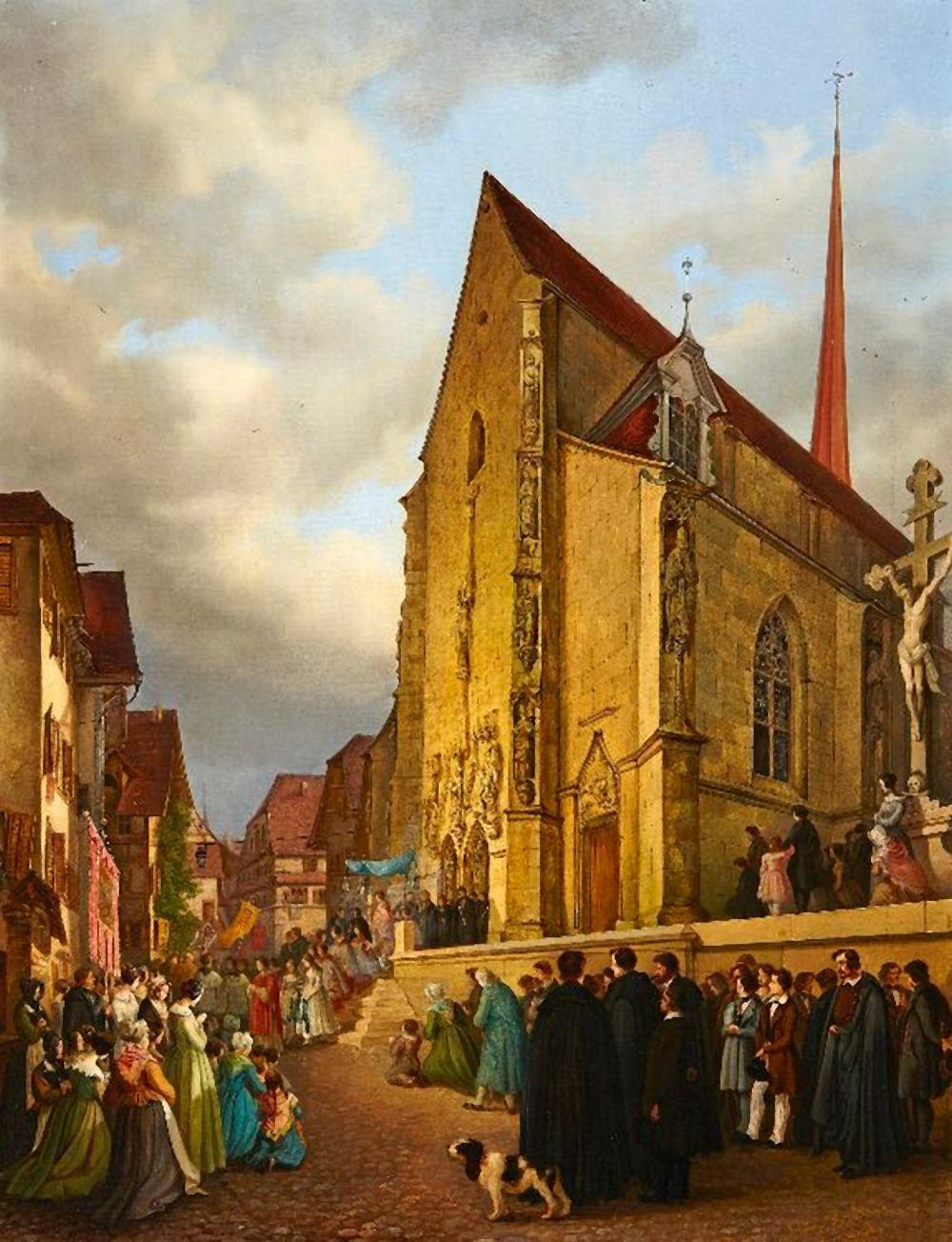
Procession in Zug, at Saint Oswald's Church

Anton Bütler, born Joseph Antonius Laurentius Bütler (12 August 1819, Auw – 18 November 1874, Lucerne) was a Swiss landscape, history and church painter.

== Life and work ==
He was the son of Niklaus Bütler, an artist, and his wife Anna Maria née Trutmann. He spent most of his childhood and youth in Küssnacht, where his family moved in 1820. His first lessons in art came from his father.

When he was sixteen, he went to the Academy of Fine Arts Munich; copying the Dutch Masters and working as an assistant to Peter von Cornelius. In 1840, he settled in Lucerne, where his family had moved the year before, and set up a studio. In 1844, he was commissioned to decorate the Grand Council Chamber. He also painted some altarpieces. In 1848, he left Lucerne for further studies. Some sources say he returned to Munich, others that he went to the Kunstakademie Düsseldorf and worked under the direction of Friedrich Wilhelm von Schadow.

From 1855 to 1857, he was in Rome. From 1865 to 1868, seeking to promote his career, he lived in Düsseldorf, with his brother Joseph, who was also a painter. He went back to Lucerne, however, and remained there for the rest of his life. His later works included historical and religious scenes, as well as landscapes. He also promoted the establishment of a drawing school for craftsmen, and worked on preservation projects at several churches, as well as at a chapel dedicated to William Tell, in Küssnacht, which his father had helped decorate in 1834.

== Sources ==
- "Bütler, Anton", In: Allgemeines Lexikon der Bildenden Künstler von der Antike bis zur Gegenwart, Vol. 5: Brewer–Carlingen, E. A. Seemann, Leipzig, 1911 (Online)
- Bernhard von Fellenberg (1957). "Bütler, Anton". Neue Deutsche Biographie (in German). Vol. 3. Berlin: Duncker & Humblot. p. 5. (full text online).
- "Bütler, Anton" in German, French and Italian in the online Historical Dictionary of Switzerland.
- "Bütler, Joseph Antonius Laurentius". SIKART Lexicon on art in Switzerland.
