= Meyer zum Pfeil =

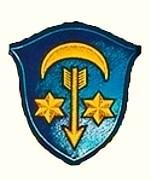
Coat of arms of the Meyer zum Pfeil family

The Meyer zum Pfeil was a prosperous Swiss noble and patrician family from Basel.

== History ==
It appears in Basel in the 15th century and is one of Basel's oldest patrician families, and dominated the city for several centuries together with a handful of other patrician families. The family were prominent merchants, especially cloth merchants, and many family members have served as council members and Mayors of Basel. The family name is derived from the arrow in its coat of arms. Family members used the noble honorific Junker already at the time the family appeared in Basel.

Family members include the renaissance humanist Nikolaus Meyer zum Pfeil, the politician Adelberg Meyer zum Pfeil and the Basel mayor Bernhard Meyer zum Pfeil.

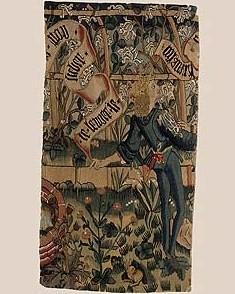

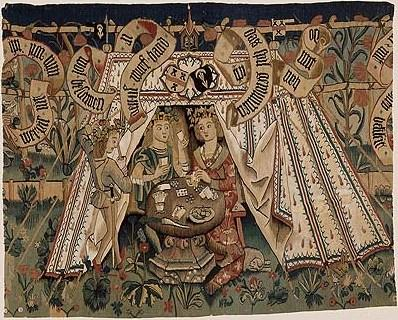
Memorial for Nikolaus Meyer zum Pfeil and Barbara zum Lufft, with their combined family arms

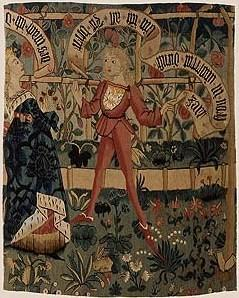
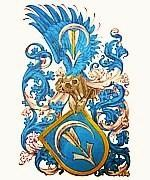
Meyer zum Pfeil coat of arms

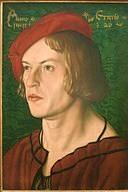
Jakob Meyer zum Pfeil son of Nikolaus Meyer zum Pfeil

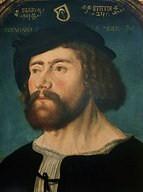
Bernhard Meyer zum Pfeil, mayor of Basel
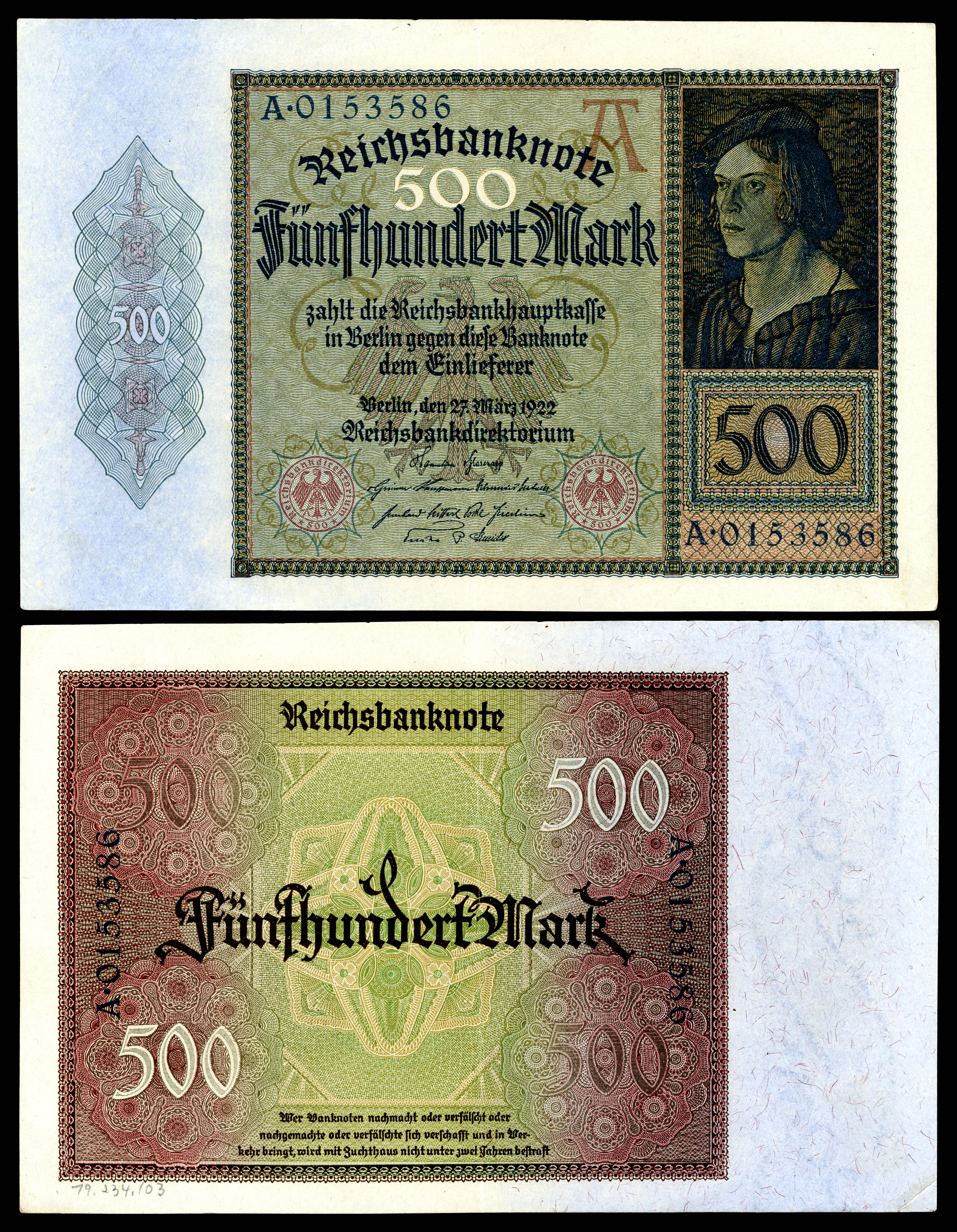
Jakob Meyer zum Pfeil depicted on a 1922 500 Mark Weimar Republic banknote
