= Nicholaus =

Nicholaus is a masculine given name. People with that name include the following:

- Nicholaus Arson the stage name of Niklas Almqvist (born 1977), Swedish musician
- Nicholaus Contreraz (1982 – 1998), American torture victim
- Nicholaus Goossen (born 1978), American director
- Nicholaus John Michael Gordon (born 1991), Canadian singer, rapper, and songwriter known by his stage name Lil Pappie
- Nicholaus R. Kipke (born 1979), American politician known as Nic Kipke
- Nicholaus Marx, American politician
- Nicholaus Szewczyk (born in RSA 1995), Polish businessman, lawyer.
- Nicholaus Cummins (born 1995), American physician

== See also ==
- Nicholas
- Nickolaus
- Nicolaus
- Church of Saint Nicholaus, Senec
