= Halepaghen Grammar School =

Coordinates: 53°28′35″N 9°41′35″E

- Buxtehude, Lower Saxony, Germany

Information
- School type: Gymnasium

The Halepaghen Grammar School (German: Gymnasium Halepaghen-Schule), or HPS, is a gymnasium ("grammar school") in Buxtehude (Lower Saxony, Germany).

The school was mentioned for the first time in 1390 as an (original) grammar school. The school was named after Gerhard Halepaghe (born about 1430 in Buxtehude; died April 1484 in Buxtehude), a famous graduate from Buxtehude.

The Halepaghen School was the first school in Germany to establish a new sixth form system. Instead of a class system (Obersekunda, Unterprima, Oberprima), the HPS established a course system.

== Notable alumni ==
- Elton, comedian
- Stefan Studer, former footballer
- Tiemo Wölken, German Member of the European Parliament (MEP, Social Democratic Party of Germany)

== See also ==
- List of the oldest schools in the world

== Pictures ==
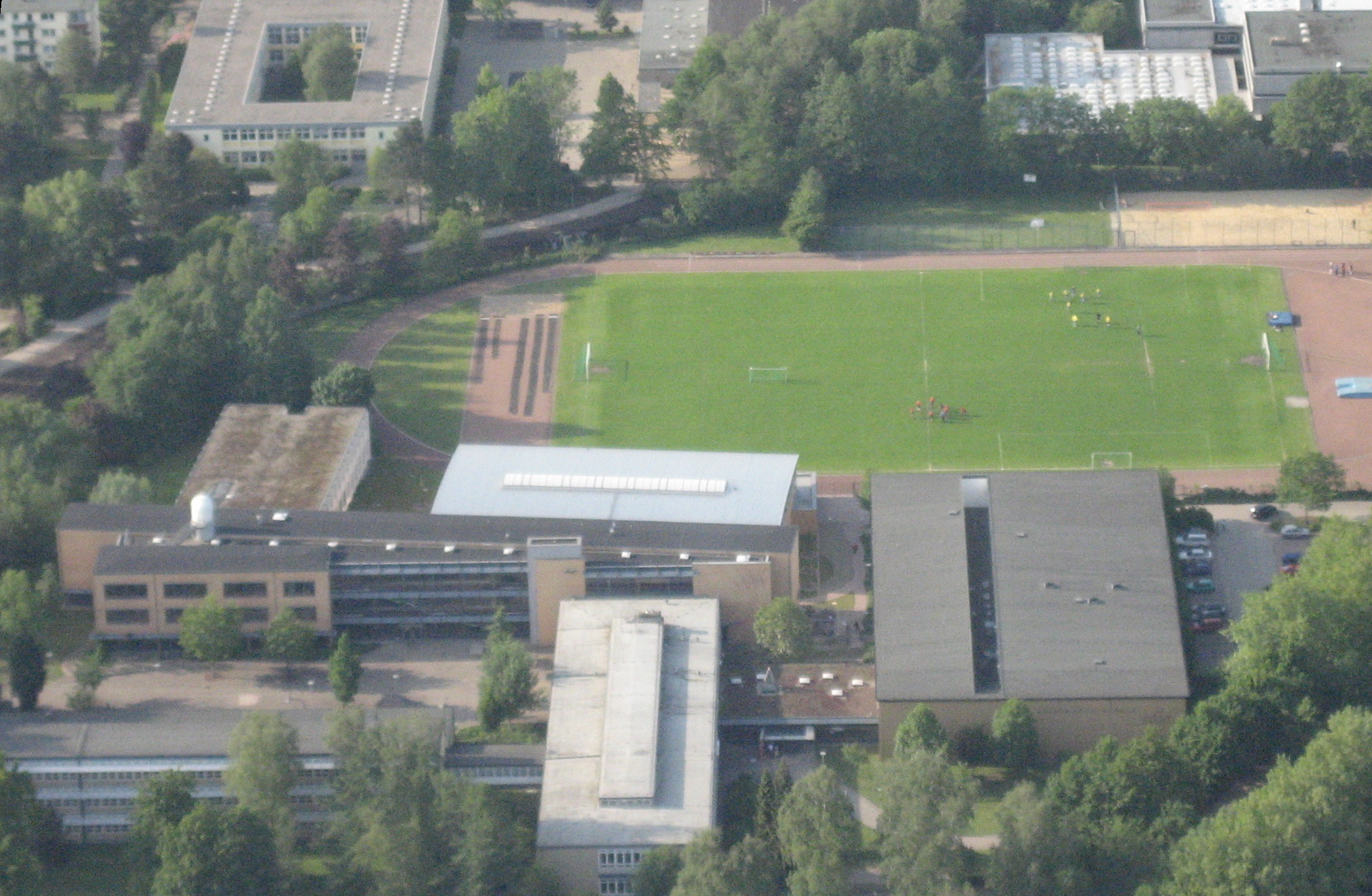

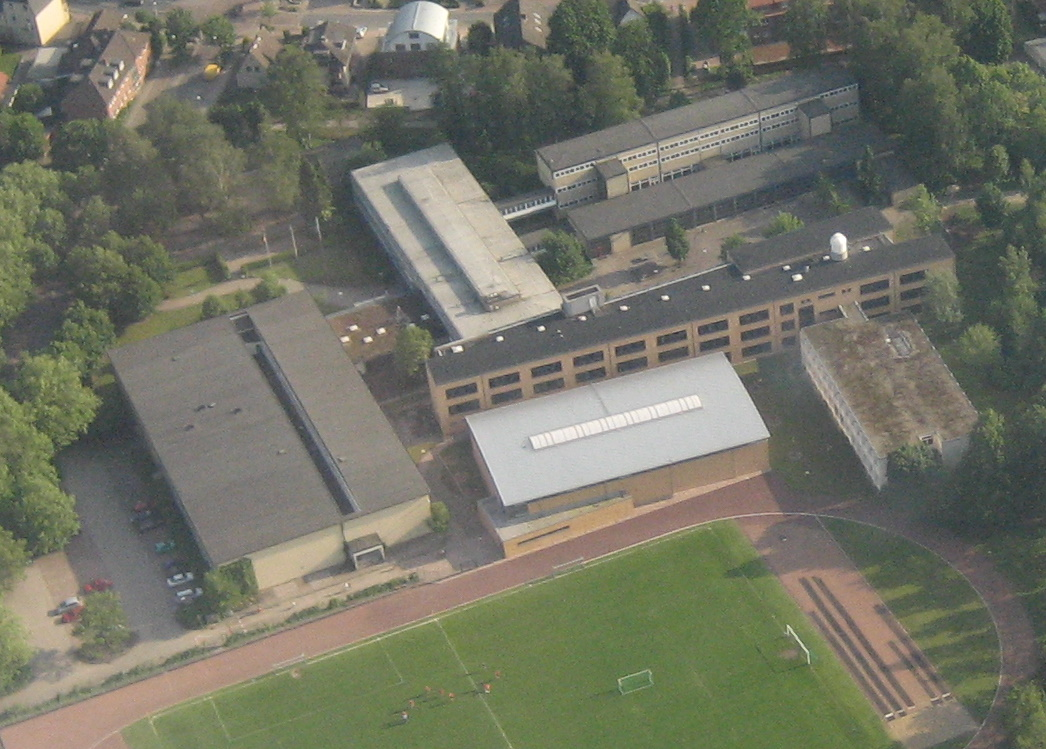

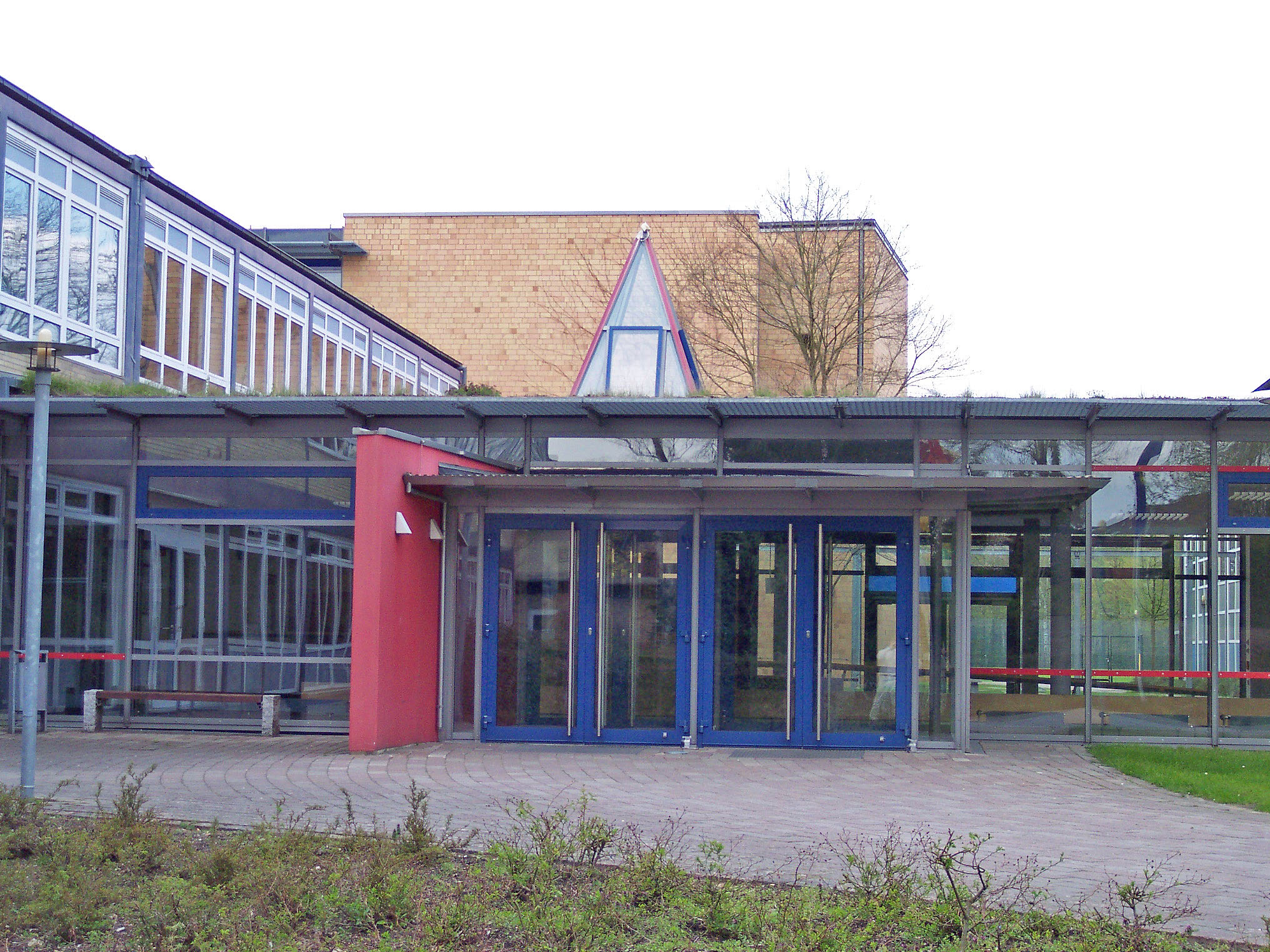

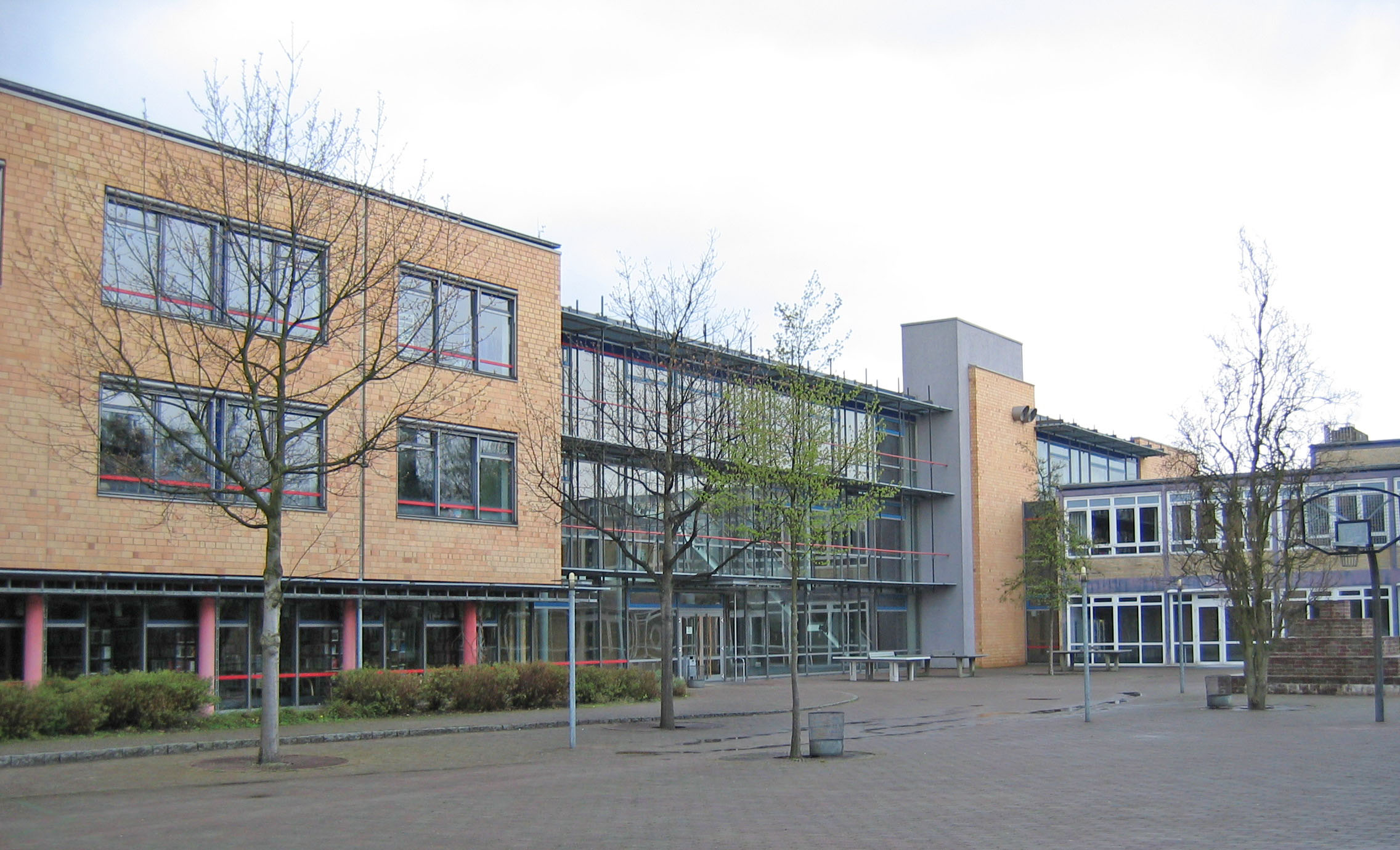

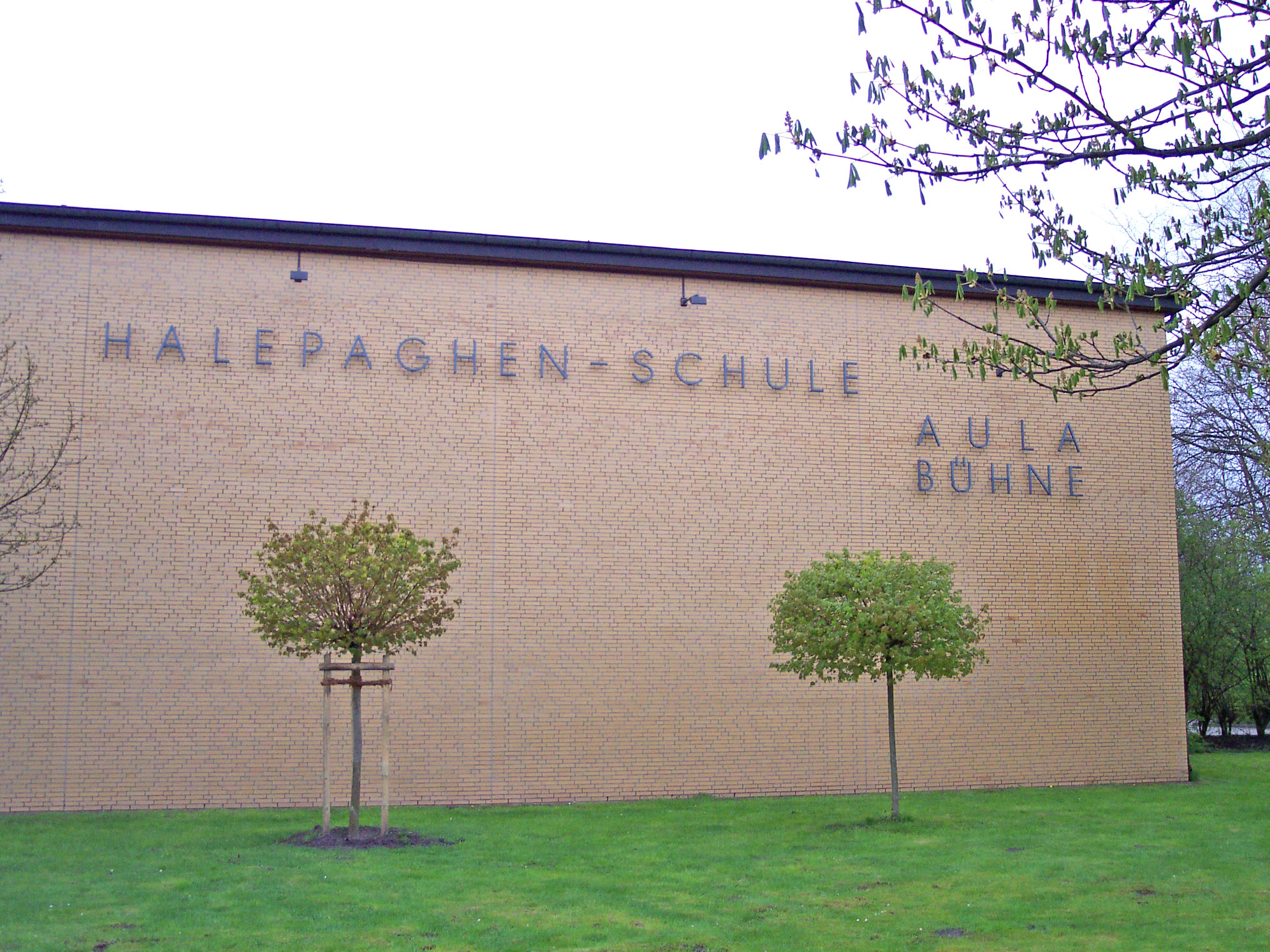

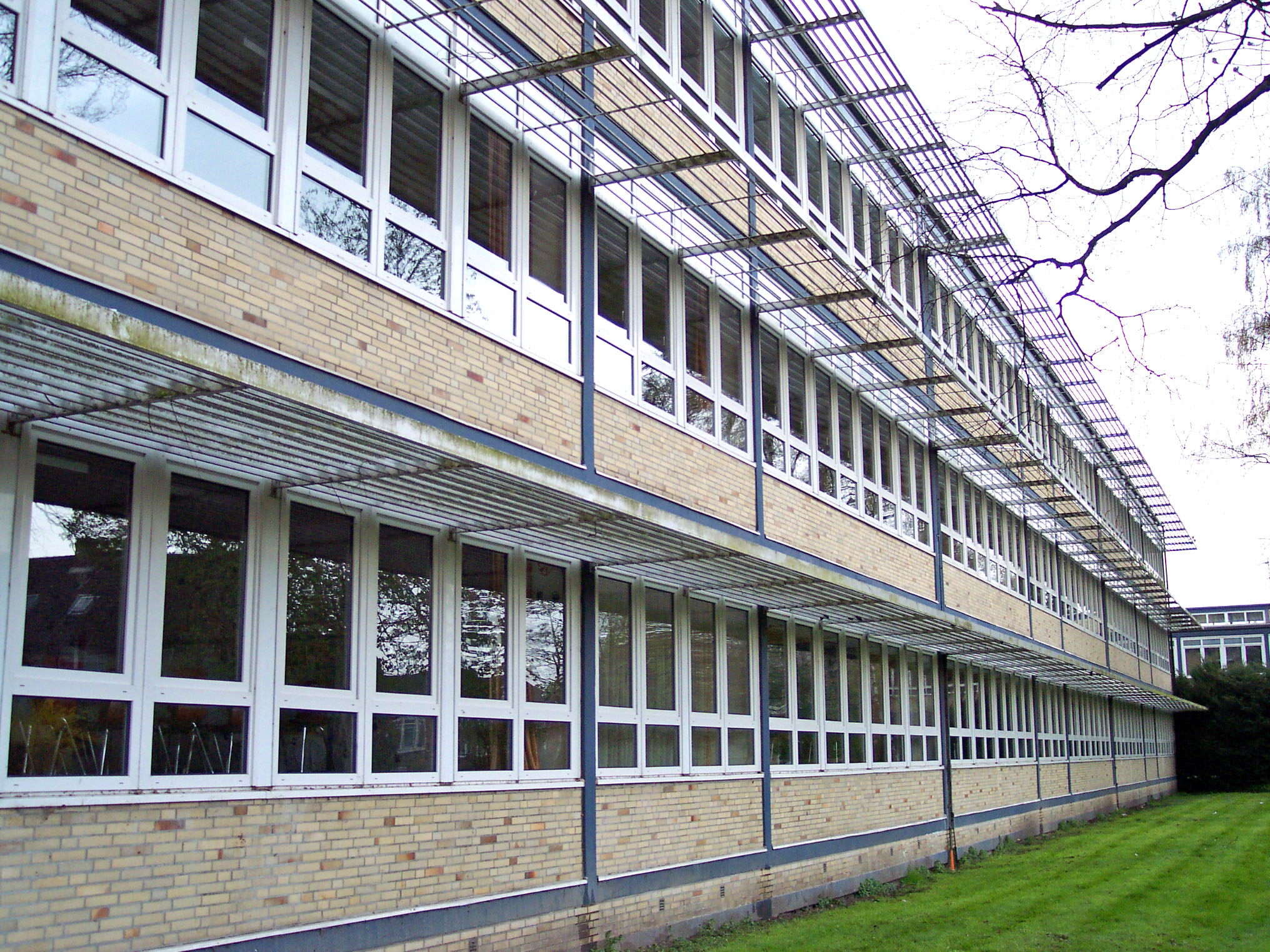

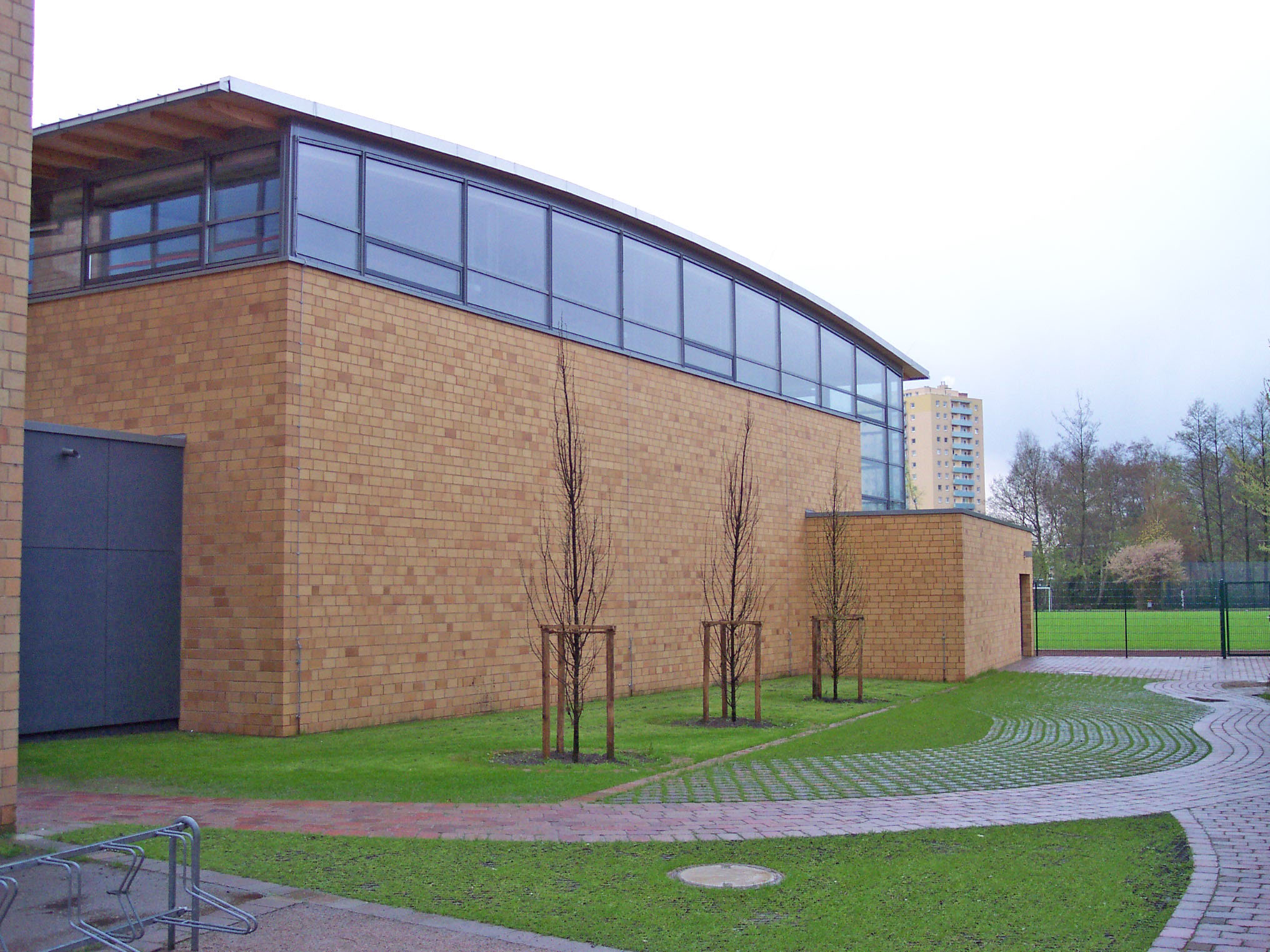

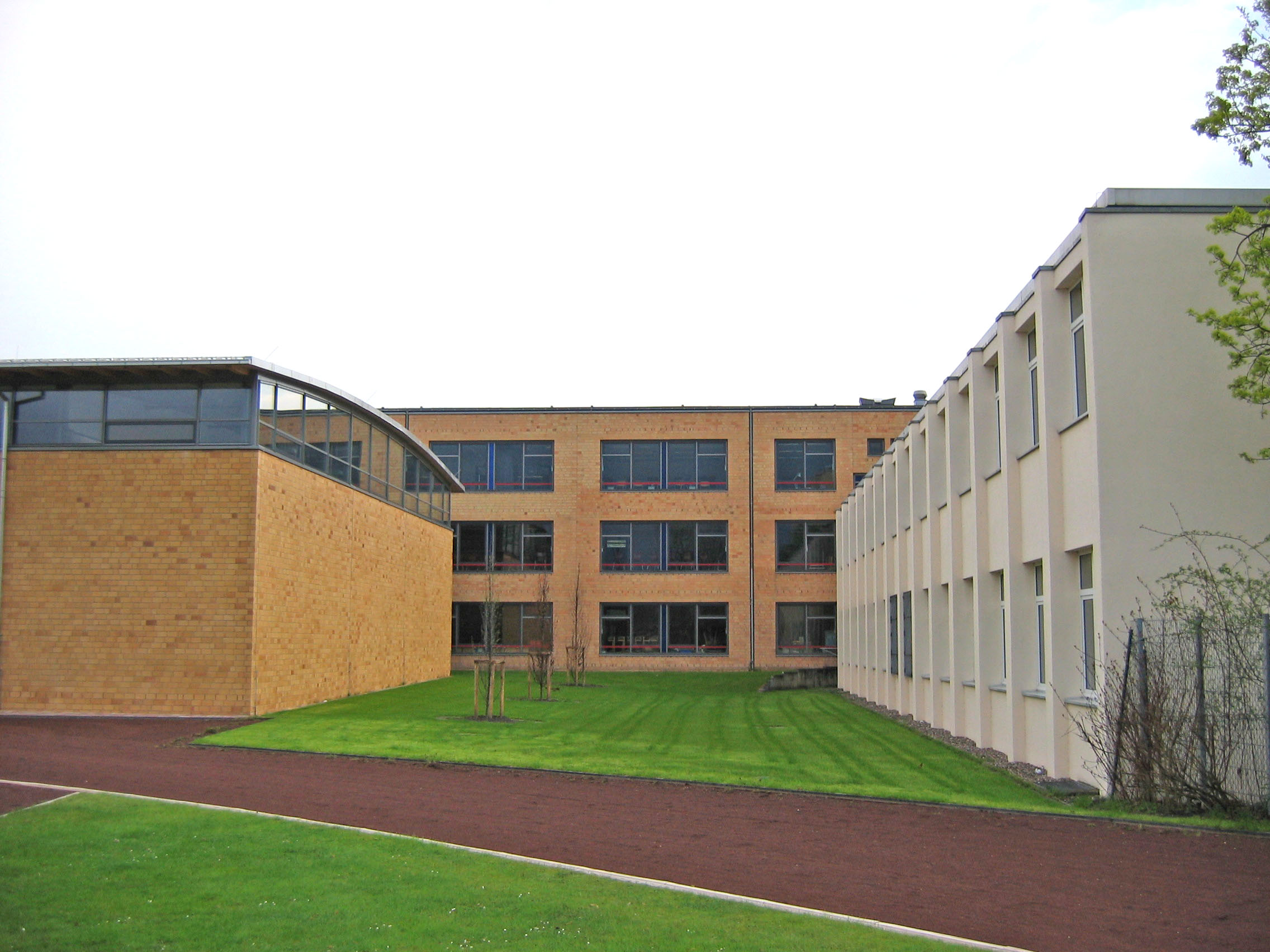

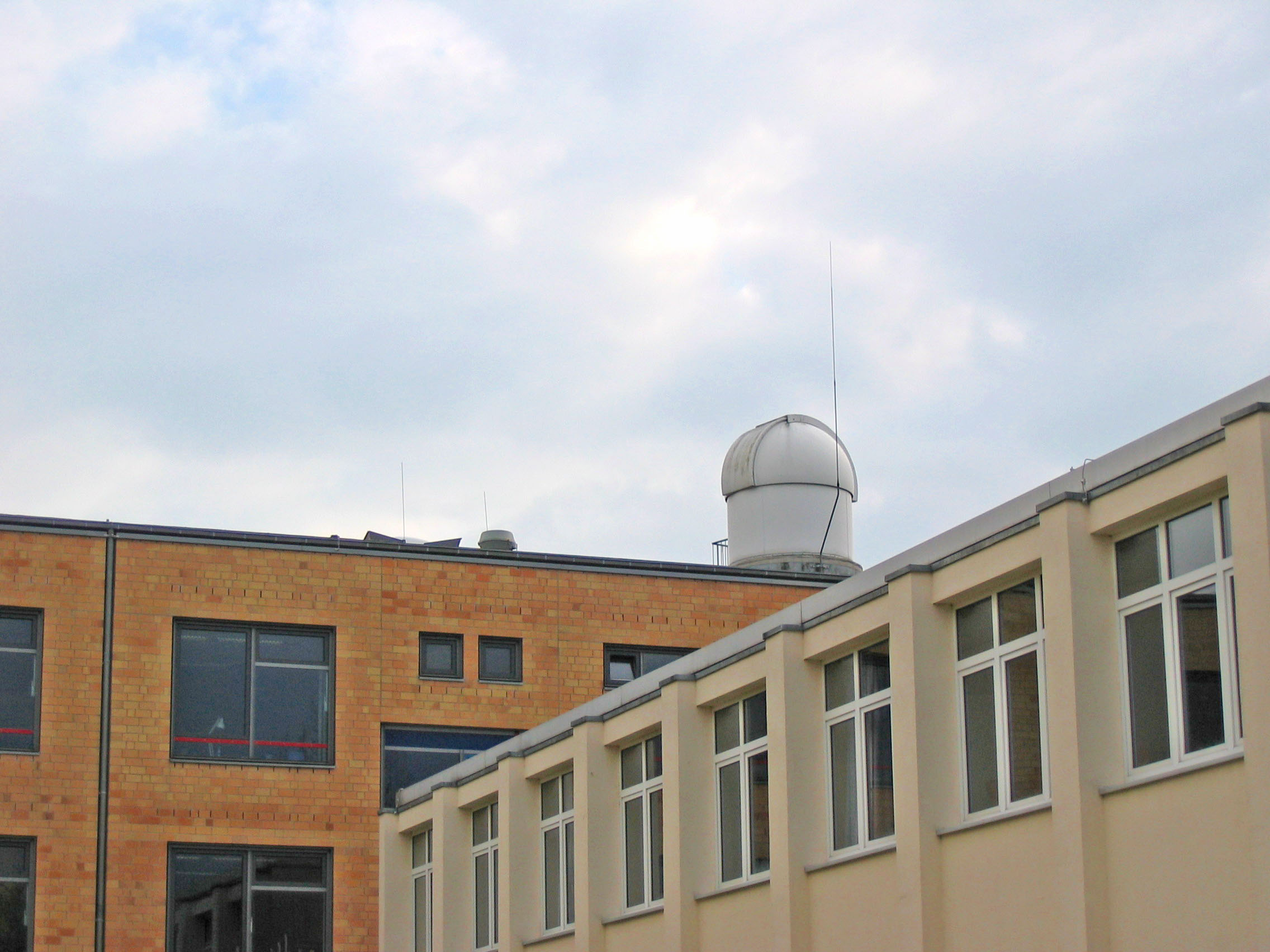

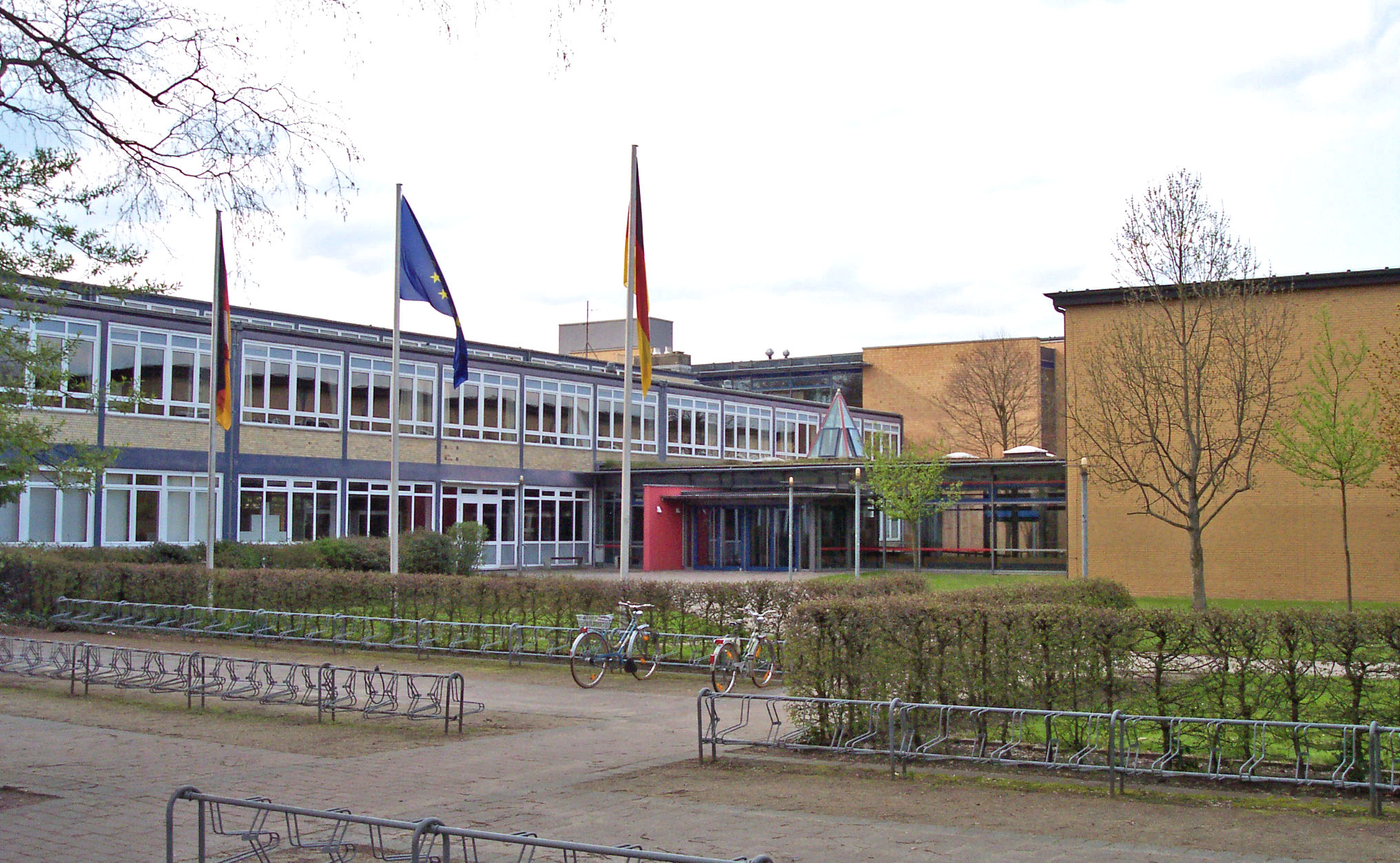
