= Niclas =

Niclas may refer to:

== Given name ==
- Niclas Alexandersson (born 1971), retired Swedish football midfielder
- Niclas Andersén (born 1988), Swedish ice hockey player
- Niclas Bendixen, Danish actor, dancer and choreographer
- Niclas Dürbrook (born 1990), German politician
- Niclas Edman (born 1991), Swedish ice hockey player
- Niclas Fasth (born 1972), Swedish professional golfer
- Niclas Frisk (born 1969), Swedish musician
- Niclas Füllkrug (born 1993), German association footballer
- Niclas Hävelid (born 1973), professional ice hockey defenceman
- Niclas Huschenbeth (born 1992), chess grandmaster.
- Niclas Jensen (born 1974), Danish professional football player
- Niclas Jönsson (born 1967), former driver in the Indy Racing League
- Niclas Kentenich (born 1988), German businessman and racing driver
- Niclas Kindvall (born 1967), retired Swedish football player
- Niclas Levein (born 1988), retired Swedish ice hockey player
- Niclas Lucenius (born 1989), Finnish professional ice hockey center
- Niclas Lundgren (born 1989), Swedish ice hockey player
- Niclas Olofsson (born 1975), former floorball goalkeeper
- Niclas Rasck (born 1969), former Swedish football defender
- Niclas Sahlgren (1701–1776), Swedish merchant and philanthropist
- Niclas Wallin (born 1975), professional ice hockey player
- Niclas Weiland (born 1972), retired German football player
- Niclas, Graf von Abensberg (1441–1485), knight and nobleman under the reign of Louis IX, Duke of Bavaria-Landshut
- Niclas Jonasson (born 1976), Swedish orienteering competitor and world champion

== Middle name ==
- Abraham Niclas Edelcrantz (1754–1821), Finnish born Swedish poet and inventor
- Jacob Niclas Ahlström (1805–1857), Swedish Kapellmeister and composer
- Johan Niclas Byström (1783–1848), Swedish sculptor

== Nickname ==
- Thomas Evan Nicholas (Niclas y Glais) (1879–1971), Welsh language poet, preacher, radical and champion of the disadvantaged of society
