= Nicolaus =

Nicolaus is a masculine given name. It is a Latin, Greek and German form of Nicholas. Nicolaus may refer to:

In science:

- Nicolaus Copernicus, a Polish astronomer who provided the first modern formulation of a heliocentric theory of the Solar System
- Nicolaus Otto (1832–1891), a German engineer

In mathematics:

- Nicolaus I Bernoulli, a Swiss mathematician
- Nicolaus II Bernoulli, a Swiss mathematician
- Nicolaus Rohlfs, an 18th-century German mathematics teacher who wrote astronomical calendars

In literature:

- Nicolaus Becker, a German lawyer and writer, the author of the Rheinlied
- Nicolaus of Damascus, a Greek historical and philosophical writer who lived in the Augustan age

In music:

- Nicolaus Bruhns, a German composer
- Nicolaus Zacharie, an Italian composer of the early Renaissance

In Christianity:

- Nicolaus Christian Friis (1714–1777), Norwegian priest and theologian
- Nicolaus Ludwig Zinzendorf, a German religious and social reformer and bishop of the Moravian Church
- Nicolaus Taurellus, a German philosopher and theologian
- Nicolaus of Antioch, one of the seven deacons listed in The Acts of the Apostles, Chapter 6, Verse 5

In other fields:

- Nicolaus Delius, a German philologist

== Other uses ==
- Nicolaus, California, a small town in the United States
- Nicolaus (leafhopper), a genus of leafhoppers

== See also ==
- Nicholas
- Nicholaus
- Nikolaus (given name)
