= Nickolaus =

Nickolaus is a given name and a surname. Notable people with this name include the following:

== Given name ==
- Nickolaus Hirschl (1906–1991), Austrian wrestler
- Nickolaus Mowrer, known as Nick Mowrer (born 1988), American sport shooter.

== Surname ==
- John M. Nickolaus Jr. (1913–1985), American cinematographer

== See also ==
- Nicholaus
- Nicklaus (name)
- Nickolas
- Nikolaus (given name)
