= Nikolaus Frank =

Swedish industrial designer (born 1964)

Nikolaus Frank (born 1964) is a Swedish industrial designer MFA ID, graduated from University College of Arts, Crafts and Design (Konstfack), Department of Industrial design in 1987. Together with his wife Cecilia Frank he runs the design company Frank Etc. AB in Stockholm, with focus on consumer products and conceptual design based on future technology.

Nikolaus Frank has worked with design groups and clients in Europe, North America and Asia. He has lectured at Konstfack and had management assignments within the telecom sector. He has received a number of awards, such as several Good Design Awards, several Excellent Swedish Design-awards, the international design prizes IDEA Industrial Design Excellence Award and the iF Award for Good Industrial Design. He has also received prices in a number of international design competitions, such as the LG Electronics International Design Competition, the Design The Future International Competition and the Yamaha Audio System International Design Competition.

Nikolaus Frank was a member of the board of the Swedish Society of Crafts and Design (Svensk Form).

== Literature ==
Design:Stockholm, Stockholms Stadsmuseum, ISBN 91-85233-41-2

1900–2002, Svensk form, Internationell design, Hedvig Hedqvist, Bokförlaget DN, ISBN 91-7588-420-8

== Sources ==
- Föreningen Svensk Form
- Ny Teknik
- Scandinavian Design
- Acela High Speed Train
