= Niklaus Bütler =

Swiss painter

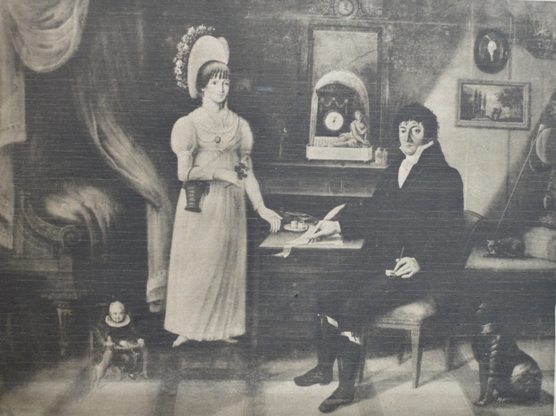
Dr.Josef Anton Sidler and His Wife

Niklaus Bütler (28 October 1786, Auw – 14 November 1864, Lucerne) was a Swiss painter; primarily of portraits.

== Life and work ==
He received his artistic training in Zürich, with Johann Heinrich Wüest and Johann Kaspar Huber (1752-1827). Upon returning to his hometown, he married Anna Maria Trutmann, from an impoverished family. They relocated to Küssnacht in 1820 and had several children, including Anton and Joseph, who also became artists.

In the hopes of procuring a better livelihood, they moved to Lucerne in 1839. Their situation improved, but they remained poor. He is mainly remembered for portraits, although he also produced church paintings, historical scenes, and theatrical sets. His best known work is a monumental canvas depicting the death of Albrecht Gessler, which was created in 1834 for a chapel in Küssnacht, where William Tell was said to have shot Gessler with a crossbow.

== Sources ==
- "Bütler (Büttler), Nikolaus", In: Allgemeines Lexikon der Bildenden Künstler von der Antike bis zur Gegenwart, Vol. 5: Brewer–Carlingen, E. A. Seemann, Leipzig, 1911 (Online)
- Otto Mittler and Georg Boner (Eds.), Biographisches Lexikon des Aargaus 1803–1957. Sauerländer, Aarau 1958
