= Nichlas Vilsmark =

Danish florist and teacher

Nichlas S O Vilsmark
- Born: July 24, 1973 (age 53); Fyn, Denmark
- Education: Jordbrugets UddannelsesCenter, Århuss
- Occupation: Floral Designer
- Parent(s): Viggo & Jonna Vilsmark

Nichlas Sorren Osman Vilsmark (born 24 July 1973) is a Danish florist and teacher, living and working in London, United Kingdom. He has worked on many major events, and was Head Florist for the wedding of the Danish Crown Prince in 2004.

== Life and work ==
Nichlas Vilsmark was born in Fyn, Denmark, a descendant of Viggo and Jonna Vilsmark. The Vilsmark family have a motorbike racing team called Team Vilsmark located in Fyn, Denmark.

He studied Floral Design 1990–1992 at Jordbrugets UddannelsesCenter Århus. 1992–1994, he was a lecturer and teacher of Floral Design at the Jordbrugets UddannelsesCenter, (Dansk Center for Jordbrugsuddannelse), Århus.

In 2004, he was the Head Florist for the Royal Wedding of the Danish Crown Prince in Copenhagen Cathedral. Illustrations in the book Royal Flower Glory, published for the Royal Wedding, show Vilsmark creating the floral decorations and installations.

In 2007, he founded Floral Symphonies to bring Scandinavian floral design to London. In 2009, he ran a Floristry Masterclass event at the Dulwich Picture Gallery, using Dutch Golden Age paintings in the Gallery as a point of inspiration, as part of the Gallery's Art for Adults Education programme. In 2010, Floral Symphonies provided the flower table centres for the King's Fund launch of No.11 Cavendish Square.

He has a strict environmental policy, seeing care for the environment as a key responsibility, and describing flowers as a "gift from mother nature". He creates both classical and contemporary Danish floristry.

Vilsmark is an approved supplier of floristry to the King’s Fund, the Dulwich Picture Gallery and the National Maritime Museum.
