= Barney Travers =

English footballer

Personal information
- Full name: Barney Travers
- Date of birth: 1894
- Place of birth: Sunderland, England
- Date of death: 16 February 1955 (age 60)
- Place of death: Sunderland, England
- Position: Forward

Senior career*
Years	Team	Apps	(Gls)
1911–1912	Sunderland Co-operative Wednesday		
1912–1913	Oak Villa		
1913–1914	New Lambton Star		
1914–1919	Sunderland West End		
1919–1921	Sunderland	58	(25)
1921–1922	Fulham	46	(28)
- * Club domestic league appearances and goals

Barney Travers (1894 – February 1955) was an English professional footballer who played as a forward for Sunderland. He received a life ban from football in 1922 after the Football Association found him guilty on a charge of offering a bribe of £20 to South Shields to throw the game against Fulham. He was pardoned in 1945.
