= Nicolaus Rohlfs =

German mathematics teacher

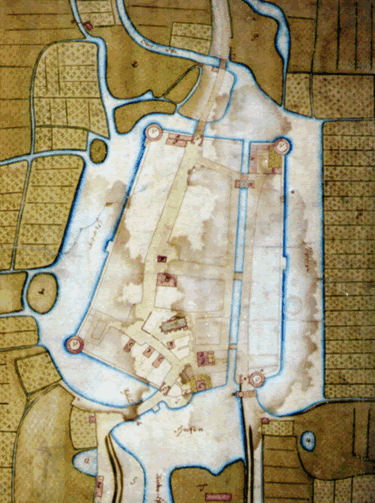
Grundriss der Stadt Buxtehude (Map of Buxtehude), 1747, by Nicolaus Rohlfs

Nicolaus Rohlfs (10 March 1695 – 29 September 1750) was a German mathematics teacher (arithmeticus) in Buxtehude and Hamburg who wrote astronomical calendars, a book about gardening, and other treatises that were continued by Matthias Rohlfs.

== Works ==
- Trigonometrische Calculation, der Anno Christi 1724. den 22 Maji ... vorfallenden grossen Sonnen-Finsterniss : wie dieselbe über den Hamburgischen Horizont sich praesentiren wird ... auffgesetzet von Nicolaus Rohlfs. Druck: Struckische Buchdruckerei, Lübeck, ca 1723
- Tabula horologica. Oder Curieuse Uhr-Tabellen, : durch deren Beyhuülfe man vermittelst eines kleinen Stöckleins, Spatzier-Stocks, Fuss-Masses oder andern Dinges, wenn es nur in 12 Theile getheilt ist, bey Sonnenschein, die Stunde des Tages finden, und andere Divertissements haben kan. Wobey (1) Ein Kupferblatt, welches laut der Anweisung zu einem Universal-Uhr zu recht gemacht und gebraucht wird; ingleichen ein Unterricht, wie mit dem Universal- und einem Horizontal-Uhr die Mittags Linie zu finden, auch wie man bey Mondenschein die Stunde der Nacht finden könne. (2) Ein Zusatz, darinn gewiesen wird, erstlich, wie man bey Sonnenschein mit einem Stoöcklein oder Strohhalm in der Hand die Uhr-Zeit finden kan; zweytens wie man die Schlag- und Taschen-Uhren richtig stellen und corrigiren soll. Gottfried Richter, Hamburg, 1733.
- Anweisung, wie die Sonnenfinsternißen über einen jeden Ort des Erd-Bodens zu berechnen. Hamburg, 1734.
- Siebenfacher königlich gross=britannisch- und chur=fürstlich Braunschweig-Lüneburgischer Staats=Calender über Dero Chru=Fürstenthum Braunschweig=Lüneburg, und desselben zugehörige Lande, Aufs Jahr 1737. Darinnen der Verbesserte, Gregorianische, Julianische, Jüdische, Römische und Türckische, nebst einem Schreib=Calender enthalten, auch andere zum Calender gehörige Sachen zu sehen sind. Welchem allen beygefüget Das Staats=Register von denen Königlichen Regierungen, und übrigen Hohen Civil- und Militair Bedienten in den teutschen Landen; Auch eine Genealogische Verzeichniß aller jetztlebenden Durchlauchtigsten Höchst= und Hohen Häuser in Europa, nach dem Alphabet. 84 Blätter, Druck: Johann Christoph Berenberg, Lauenburg. Note: In this form published for many years (since ca 1752 continued by Matthias Rohlfs)
- Betrachtung der beyden grossen Himmels-Lichter Sonn und Mond. Hamburg: Samuel Heyl, 1736
- Betrachtung der ... grossen Sonnen-Finsterniss am 25. Julii dieses Jahrs: als ein Supplement .. Betrachtung der grossen Himmels-Lichter Sonn und Mond, ... 1736
- Künstliches Zahlen Spiel, oder gründliche Anweisung wie die so genannten Magischen-Quadraten auf eine sehr leichte Art zu verfertigen sind, etc. 1742
- Königl. schleswig-holsteinischer Haus- und Garten-Allmanach: auf das ... Jahr Christi; ueber den schleswig-holsteinis. Horizont gestellet. Altona : Burmester, 1750–1784. In the beginning: Nicolavs Rohlfs, later Matthias Rohlfs
