= Nickolas =

Nickolas is a variation of the given name Nicholas.

Nickolas may refer to:

== People ==
- Nickolas Ashford (1941–2011), American singer with Ashford & Simpson
- Nickolas Butler (born 1979), American writer
- Nick Carter (musician) (born 1980), American entertainer
- Nickolas Davatzes (fl. 1983–2006), American television executive
- Nickolas Grace (born 1947), English actor
- Nickolas Levasseur (fl. 2006–2014), American politician, New Hampshire
- Nickolas Martin (born 2002), American football player
- Nickolas Morin-Soucy (born 1984), former professional Canadian football player
- Nickolas Muray (1892-1965), Hungarian-born American photographer and Olympic fencer
- Nickolas Perry (born 1967), American writer, film director, editor, and photographer
- Nickolas Ray Young, American actor and firefighter

== Characters ==
- Nick Sobotka, character on American drama The Wire

== See also ==
- Nicholas (disambiguation)
- Nickolaus
- Nikolaos (disambiguation)
- Nickolai Stoilov
