= Nikolaus Heinrich von Schönfeld =

Royal-Prussian Lieutenant General and Governor of Castle Schweidnitz

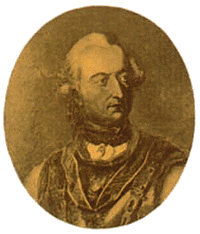
- Nikolaus Heinrich von Schönfeld
- Born: 1733
- Died: 1795 (aged 61–62)
- Allegiance: Kingdom of Prussia
- Branch: Cavalry
- Rank: General-Leutnant
- Conflicts: War of the First Coalition; Battle of Valmy; Battle of Kaiserslautern

Nikolaus Heinrich von Schönfeld (1733 – 1795) was a Prussian general who led troops in 1792–1793 during the War of the First Coalition. In 1777 he built the Schloss Schönfeld in Kassel, Germany which he used as a summer residence until 1790. At a later date the building was used by the Brothers Grimm.

== Military career ==
During the Battle of Valmy on 20 September 1792, Schönfeld led a division consisting of brigades under Friedrich Gisbert Wilhelm von Romberg and Otto Heinrich Friedrich von Borch. Romburg commanded Infantry Regiments Brunswick Nr. 21 and Woldeck Nr. 41 while Borch led Infantry Regiments Thadden Nr. 3 and Romberg Nr. 10. Each regiment had three battalions and each battalion had one attached cannon.

At the Battle of Kaiserslautern from 28 to 30 November 1793, Schönfeld led a division that counted three battalions of the Crousaz Infantry Regiment Nr. 39, Fusilier Battalion Legat Nr. 20, one company of Jägers, one company of Imperial Trier Jägers, five squadrons each of the Borstell Cuirassiers Nr. 7 and Lottum Dragoons Nr. 1, two squadrons of the Eben Hussars Nr. 2, and one foot and one horse artillery batteries of eight guns each. All but the Trier Jägers were Prussian units.

== Schloss ==
In 1777, Schönfeld built the Schloss Schönfeld in Kassel, Germany. He used the building as a summer residence until 1790. Afterward the schloss changed hands several times as other people fell in love with its charm. Among those who used the building in the early 1800s were the Brothers Grimm. The Schloss Schönfeld still exists as a museum.
