= Charlie Nicklas =

English footballer (1930–2018)

Personal information
- Full name: Charles Nicklas
- Date of birth: 26 April 1930
- Place of birth: Sunderland, England
- Date of death: 26 July 2018 (aged 88)
- Place of death: Sunderland, England
- Height: 5 ft 8 1/2 in (1.74 m)
- Position: Centre forward

Senior career*
Years	Team	Apps	(Gls)
1950	Silksworth Colliery Welfare		
1950–1953	Hull City	6	(1)
1953–1954	Darlington	17	(6)
1954–1955	Headington United	13	(4)
- * Club domestic league appearances and goals

Charles Nicklas (26 April 1930 – 26 July 2018) was an English footballer who played as a centre forward in the Football League for Hull City and Darlington. Before joining Hull, Nicklas played non-league football for Silksworth Colliery Welfare, and after leaving Darlington he played in the Southern League for Headington United.

== Life and career ==
Nicklas was born in 1930 in Sunderland, which was then in County Durham. He played as a wing half before what the Sunderland Echo described as a promising career was interrupted by National Service in the Royal Air Force. He began playing for Wearside League club Silksworth Colliery Welfare at the start of the 1950–51 season, but soon went on trial with Football League Second Division club Hull City, and turned professional with that club in December 1950.

He made his first-team debut a year later, on 27 October 1951, playing in the unaccustomed position of centre forward; although he had played a few reserve matches in that position, the Yorkshire Post doubted that "a home match against a team playing as strongly as Rotherham United are just now is the ideal occasion" for a youngster's debut. Rotherham took a three-goal lead, but Hull came back to draw, and Nicklas scored their opener: he "had his faults, but dash, speed and courage were not among them. He harassed [the goalkeeper] into a goal offering and accepted it with glee". He was known for his pace, having competed in professional sprint races. Nicklas played five more matches for Hull, the last of which was on 22 March 1952.

Nicklas stayed with the club until the end of the following season, when he moved on to Darlington of the Third Division North. He scored six goals from seventeen league matches for Darlington, and spent the 1954–55 season with Headington United in the Southern League, scoring four goals from fourteen matches in all competitions.

Nicklas, a nephew of Sunderland and Fulham player Barney Travers, died in his native Sunderland in 2018 at the age of 88.
