= Nikolaus Meyer zum Pfeil =

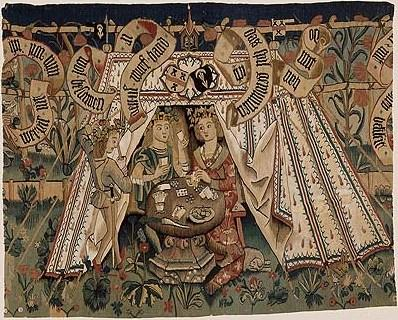
Memorial for Nikolaus Meyer zum Pfeil and Barbara zum Lufft, with their combined arms, Basel ca. 1471/1490

Junker Nikolaus Meyer zum Pfeil (1451 in Basel – 1500 in Basel) was a German renaissance humanist and author from Basel. He served as Mayor of Mulhouse and as a member of the Grand Council of Basel.

He was a member of the prominent Meyer zum Pfeil family.

== Literature ==
- M. Backes: Fremde Historien. Untersuchungen zur Überlieferungs- und Rezeptionsgeschichte französischer Erzählstoffe im deutschen Spätmittelalter (Hermaea NF 103), Tübingen 2004, S. 104.
- G. Binz: Basel, Universitätsbibliothek, O. I. 18. Archivbeschreibung 1938, p. 1f.
- J. Geiss: Bibliotheken zwischen zwei Einbanddeckeln? Überlegungen zum rezeptionsgeschichtlichen Wert von Inkunabel-Sammelbänden, in: Scrinium Berolinense. Tilo Brandis zum 65. Geburtstag, Volume II, Ed. by P. J. Becker, E. Bliembach u. a. Berlin 2000, p. 718-728, particularly p. 721f.
- P. Ochsenbein: "Gebetbuch des Niklaus Meyer zum Pfeil", in: 2VL 2 (1980), p. 1119f.
- U. Rautenberg: Die "Melusine" des Thüring von Ringoltingen und der Basler Erstdruck des Bernhard Richel, in: A. Schnyder/U. Rautenberg (eds.): Thüring von Ringoltingen: Melusine (1456). Nach dem Erstdruck Basel: Richel um 1473/74, Band II: Kommentar und Aufsätze, Wiesbaden 2006, p. 61-99, p. 75f.
