= Niclas Levein =

Swedish ice hockey player

- Born: March 3, 1988 (age 37); Linköping, Sweden
- Height: 6 ft 0 in (183 cm)
- Weight: 187 lb (85 kg; 13 st 5 lb)
- Position: Forward
- Shot: left
- Playing career: 2005–2007

Niclas Levein (born March 3, 1988, in Linköping, Sweden) is a former Swedish ice hockey player.

He made his debut with Färjestads BK in the Elitserien during the 2006/07 season, playing a total of 5 games. After the season, he left Färjestads and signed a try-out contract with Rögle BK. In December 2007 Levein decided to retire from professional hockey due to an injury. He also played with Enköpings SK.
