= Niclas Dürbrook =

German politician (born 1990)

Member of the Landtag of Schleswig-Holstein
- Incumbent
- Assumed office 7 June 2022

Personal details
- Born: 7 June 1990 (age 36)
- Party: Social Democratic Party (since 2008)

Niclas Dürbrook (born 7 June 1990) is a German politician serving as a member of the Landtag of Schleswig-Holstein since 2022. He has served as chairman of the Social Democratic Party in Ostholstein since 2017. From 2014 to 2017, he served as chairman of Jusos in Schleswig-Holstein.
