= Nicklas Strid =

Swedish ice hockey player

- Born: May 15, 1994 (age 31) Sweden
- Height: 6 ft 0 in (183 cm)
- Weight: 163 lb (74 kg; 11 st 9 lb)
- Position: Left wing
- Shoots: Right
- SHL team: Brynäs IF
- Playing career: 2013–present

Nicklas Strid (born May 15, 1994) is a Swedish ice hockey player. He is currently playing with Brynäs IF of the Swedish Hockey League (SHL).

Strid made his Swedish Hockey League debut playing with Brynäs IF during the 2013–14 SHL season.
