= Nicklaus (name) =

Nicklaus is a given name and surname. Notable people with the name include

== Given name ==
- Nicklaus Jordan Gardewine (born 1993), American baseball player known as Nick Gardewine
- Nicklaus O'Leary (born 1992), American gridiron football player known as Nick O'Leary
- Nicklaus Schandelmaier (born 1968), German musician known by his stage name En Esch
- Nicklaus Thomas-Symonds (born 1980), Welsh politician known as Nick Thomas-Symonds
- Nicklaus James Dellicastelli (born 1995), Australian filmmaker and actor

== Surname ==
- Gary Nicklaus (born 1969), American golfer
- Jack Nicklaus (born 1940), American golfer
- Windy Nicklaus (1904–1991), American football player and coach

== See also ==
- Nickolaus
- Niklaus (name)
- Hans Niclaus
