= Nikolaus Katzer =

German historian

Nikolaus Katzer (born 12 October 1952) is a German historian and was the director of the German Historical Institute Moscow until 2018.

== Early life and education ==
Nikolaus Katzer was born in Marburg on 12 October 1952. From 1974 to 1978 he studied history and Russian studies at the Johann Wolfgang Goethe-University Frankfurt am Main. In 1978 he completed the first state exams and in 1984 the second state exams for the Gymnasiallehramt. In 1983 his doctorate was awarded.

== Career ==
Katzer worked on a research project to the quadripartite meetings with the 1950s and was from 1987 to 1993 assistant professor at the Rheinische Friedrich-Wilhelms University of Bonn. In 1993 he was a fellow of the Deutsche Forschungsgemeinschaft. This was followed by research trips and archival research in London, Stanford, New York and Moscow. From 1994 to 1996 he worked as a teacher of history and Russian at Elizabeth High School in Frankfurt am Main. In 1996, he qualified as a professor. Since then, he has been professor of the history of the 19th and 20th centuries with special regard Central and Eastern Europe at the Helmut Schmidt University Hamburg. Since May 2010 he has been director of the German Historical Institute in Moscow. Since 2010 he has been a member of the joint commission for the exploration of the recent history of German-Russian relations.

His research interests include:

- War and Social Order, Civil War and Social Change (1812-1825, 1914-1921)
- Social and cultural history of the Brežnev era
- Science, technology and modernity in Russia
- Body culture and sport in Soviet civilization
- Literature and history

== Selected publications ==
- Die weisse Bewegung in Russland. Köln, Böhlau, 1999. ISBN 978-3-412-11698-9
