= Nikolaus Mondt =

German ice hockey player

Niki Mondt
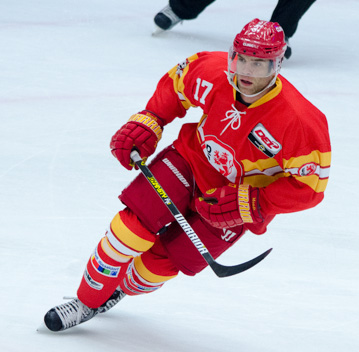
- Born: 9 August 1978 (age 47) Düsseldorf, West Germany
- Height: 6 ft 0 in (183 cm)
- Weight: 181 lb (82 kg; 12 st 13 lb)
- Position: Right Wing
- Shot: Left
- Played for: Düsseldorfer EG; Kassel Huskies; ERC Ingolstadt; Kölner Haie; Hannover Scorpions
- National team: Germany
- Playing career: 1996–2016

Nikolaus "Niki" Mondt (born 9 August 1978 in Düsseldorf) is a German former professional ice hockey player. He began and later returned to complete his playing hockey career with Düsseldorfer EG in the Deutsche Eishockey Liga (DEL).

== Playing career ==
Mondt began his pro career with Düsseldorfer EG during the 1995–96 season, playing 14 games and winning the DEL championship, though he did not dress for a playoff game. In the years following, Mondt was among the top performers on the team until the club was relegated to the 2nd Bundesliga in 1998. He then played two seasons for the Kassel Huskies until he rejoined Düsseldorfer EG when they were promoted back to the top level.

The Ingolstadt Panthers added Mondt during the 2002–03 season, where he would be named a DEL All-Star each of the following two seasons.

After a season with Kölner Haie, Mondt signed with the Hannover Scorpions in 2006. With the Scorpions he again won the DEL championship in 2010, appearing in (an injury-shortened) five post-season games. In 2012 Mondt came back to his hometown Düsseldorf where he plays for Düsseldorfer EG again.

== International play ==
Mondt appeared in the 1999 IIHF World Championship for the German national team, as well as in 1995, representing their junior team.

== Career statistics ==
			Regular season					Playoffs
Season	Team	League	GP	G	A	Pts	PIM	GP	G	A	Pts	PIM
1994–95	Düsseldorfer EG U20	Junioren-BL	26	23	12	35	46	—	—	—	—	—
1995–96	Düsseldorfer EG	DEL	21	1	1	2	0	—	—	—	—	—
1996–97	Düsseldorfer EG	DEL	41	1	5	6	10	3	0	1	1	0
1997–98	Düsseldorfer EG	DEL	42	2	15	17	18	2	0	0	0	0
1998–99	Kassel Huskies	DEL	52	6	16	22	24	—	—	—	—	—
1999–00	Kassel Huskies	DEL	56	0	10	10	22	8	1	3	4	4
2000–01	Düsseldorfer EG	DEL	42	2	7	9	92	—	—	—	—	—
2001–02	DEG Metro Stars	DEL	59	5	6	11	38	—	—	—	—	—
2002–03	DEG Metro Stars	DEL	18	1	1	2	6	—	—	—	—	—
2002–03	ERC Ingolstadt	DEL	32	3	5	8	10	—	—	—	—	—
2003–04	ERC Ingolstadt	DEL	52	8	10	18	20	9	1	1	2	4
2004–05	ERC Ingolstadt	DEL	46	8	16	24	30	11	0	2	2	2
2005–06	Kölner Haie	DEL	52	4	8	12	42	9	0	2	2	10
2006–07	Hannover Scorpions	DEL	52	6	15	21	22	6	1	0	1	6
2007–08	Hannover Scorpions	DEL	56	9	12	21	22	3	0	2	2	8
2008–09	Hannover Scorpions	DEL	50	4	12	16	48	11	1	0	1	6
2009–10	Hannover Scorpions	DEL	56	5	15	20	30	11	0	4	4	8
2010–11	Hannover Scorpions	DEL	42	8	5	13	26	5	0	2	2	2
2011–12	Hannover Scorpions	DEL	52	1	16	17	20	—	—	—	—	—
2012–13	Düsseldorfer EG	DEL	52	5	15	20	32	—	—	—	—	—
2013–14	Düsseldorfer EG	DEL	50	6	6	12	18	—	—	—	—	—
2014–15	Düsseldorfer EG	DEL	45	5	10	15	14	—	—	—	—	—
2015–16	Düsseldorfer EG	DEL	9	0	2	2	4	—	—	—	—	—
DEL totals			982	90	208	298	550	78	4	17	21	50

== Awards and achievements ==
- DEL Champion - 1996, 2010.
- Deutscher Eishockey-Pokal Champion - 2005
- DEL All-Star - 1999–00, 2003–04, 2004–05
