= Nick (given name) =

- Pronunciation: /nɪk/ NIK
- Gender: Male
- Language: English

Other gender
- Feminine: Nicki

Origin
- Languages: 1. Greek; 2. English
- Origin: Diminutive form of Nicholas
- Region of origin: English-speaking world

Other names
- Alternative spelling: Nic; Nik
- Related names: Nicholas, Nicola, Nicolas, Nicolai, Nikola, Nicky

Nick is a masculine given name. It is commonly used as a short form (diminutive, hypocorism) of the given names Nicholas and similar: Nicola, Nicolas, Nikola, Nicolai, etc.

== People with the given name ==
Notable people with the name include:

- Nick Abbot (born 1960), British broadcaster and radio talk show host
- Nick Abendanon (born 1986), Dutch rugby player
- Nick Abruzzese (born 1999), American ice hockey player
- Nick Acquaviva (1927–2003), American composer and band leader
- Nick Adams (disambiguation), multiple people
- Nick Adduci (1929–2005), American football player
- Nick Adenhart (1986–2009), American baseball player
- Nick Afoa (born 1986), New Zealand tenor and rugby union player
- Nick Ahmed (born 1990), American baseball player
- Nick Akins (born 1961), American CEO of American Electric Power
- Nick Aldis (born 1986), English wrestler
- Nick Allegretti (born 1996), American football player
- Nick Allen (1888–1939), American baseball player
- Nick Anderson (disambiguation), multiple people
- Nick Ansell (born 1994), Australian footballer
- Nick Awde (born 1961), British writer, artist, singer-songwriter, and critic
- Nick Ayers (born 1982), American political strategist
- Nick Bakay (born 1961), American actor and comedian
- Nick Baker (disambiguation), multiple people
- Nick Barnett (born 1981), American football player
- Nick Barrett (born 1988), New Zealand rugby union footballer
- Nick Barrett (American football) (born 2003), American football player
- Nick Bassett, American musician
- Nick Bateman (disambiguation), multiple people
- Nick Bawden (born 1996), American football player
- Nick Becker (born 1968), American former volleyball player
- Nick Becker (baseball) (born 2006), American baseball player
- Nick Beggs (born 1961), English musician
- Nick Bell (disambiguation), multiple people
- Nick Bellore (born 1989), American football player
- Nick Berg (1978–2004), American radio-tower repairman
- Nick Berry (born 1963), English television actor and musician
- Nick Best (born 1968), American strongman
- Nick Beverley (born 1947), Canadian hockey player and coach
- Nick Bitsko (born 2002), American baseball player
- Nick Bjugstad (born 1992), American ice hockey player
- Nick Blackburn (born 1982), American baseball player
- Nick Blackman (born 1989), British-Israeli footballer
- Nick Blackwell (born 1990), British boxer
- Nick Blinko (born 1961), British musician and artist
- Nick Blood (born 1982), English actor
- Nick Bobeck (born 1980), American football coach
- Nick Bockwinkel (1934–2015), American wrestler
- Nick Bollettieri (1939–2022), American tennis coach
- Nick Bolton (born 2000), American football player
- Nick Bonino (born 1988), American ice hockey player
- Nick Boraine (born 1971), South African actor
- Nick Bosa (born 1997), American football player
- Nick Bostrom (born 1973), Swedish philosopher
- Nick Bougas (born 1955), American film director and illustrator
- Nick Bourne (born 1952), British politician
- Nick Bowers (born 1996), American football player
- Nick Boyer (born 1993), American rugby union player
- Nick Boyle (born 1993), American football player
- Nick Boynton (born 1979), Canadian ice hockey player
- Nick Broeker (born 2000), American football player
- Nick Brossette (born 1996), American football player
- Nick Bravin (born 1971), American Olympic fencer
- Nick Brewer (born 1989), English rapper
- Nick Bright, British radio DJ
- Nick Brown (born 1950), British politician
- Nick Bruno (born 1951), president of the University of Louisiana at Monroe
- Nick Bruno, American film director and animator
- Nick Buoniconti (1940–2019), American football player
- Nick Burdi (born 1993), American baseball player
- Nick Caamano (born 1998), Canadian ice hockey player
- Nick Cafardo (1956–2019), American sportswriter
- Nick Caistor (born 1946), British journalist and translator
- Nick Calathes (born 1989), Greek-American basketball player
- Nick Cannon (born 1980), American comedian and rapper
- Nick Capra (born 1958), American baseball manager
- Nick Cardy (1920–2013), American comic book artist
- Nick Carle (born 1981), Australian football player
- Nick Carter (disambiguation), multiple people
- Nick Cassavetes (born 1959), American actor and director
- Nick Castle (born 1947), American screenwriter
- Nick Catanese (born 1971), American musician
- Nick Catone (born 1981), American mixed martial artist
- Nick Cavaday (born 1986), English tennis player and coach
- Nick Cave (born 1957), Australian musician, songwriter, author, screenwriter, composer, and actor
- Nick Cave (performance artist) (born 1959), American fabric sculptor, dancer, and performance artist
- Nick Ceroli (1939–1985), American jazz drummer
- Nick Chambers (born 1985), American stand-up comedian
- Nick Charles (disambiguation), multiple people
- Nick Chinlund (born 1961), American actor
- Nick Chubb (born 1995), American football player
- Nick Ciuffo (born 1995), American baseball player
- Nick Civetta (born 1989), American rugby union player
- Nick Clausen (1900–1989), Danish boxer
- Nick Clegg (born 1967), British politician
- Nick Clooney (born 1934), American journalist and television host
- Nick Coe (born 1998), American football player
- Nick Cohen (born 1961), English journalist, author, and political commentator
- Nick Cohen (filmmaker) (born1971), British film director, producer, actor and screenwriter
- Nick Coleman (disambiguation), multiple people
- Nick Collins (born 1983), American football player
- Nick Collison (born 1980), American basketball player
- Nick Cordero (1978–2020), Canadian actor
- Nick Cousins (born 1993), Canadian ice hockey player
- Nick Cravat (1912–1994), American actor and stunt performer
- Nick Cross (disambiguation), multiple people
- Nick Cummins (born 1987), Australian rugby union player
- Nick Cunningham (born 1985), American bobsledder
- Nick Curran (1977–2012), American singer and guitarist
- Nick Cvjetkovich (born 1973), Canadian wrestler
- Nick Daffy (born 1973), Australian footballer
- Nick Dal Santo (born 1984), Australian footballer
- Nick Damici (born 1959), American actor
- Nick Damore (1916–1969), Canadian ice hockey player
- Nick Dandolos (1883–1966), Greek professional gambler
- Nick Dasovic (born 1968), Canadian soccer player
- Nick Davies (born 1953), British investigative journalist, writer, and documentary maker
- Nick Davila (born 1985), American football player
- Nick Davis (disambiguation), multiple people
- Nick Dawkins (born 2002), American football player
- Nick Dear (born 1955), English writer for stage, screen, and radio
- Nick DeCarbo (1910–1991), American football player
- Nick DeFelice (born 1940), American football player
- Nick DeGennaro (born 2000), American football player
- Nick DeLeon (born 1990), American soccer player
- Nick DeLuca (born 1995), American football player
- Nick Dempsey (born 1980), British windsurfer
- Nick Dennis (1904–1980), American film actor
- Nick Denton (born 1966), British Internet entrepreneur
- Nick DePuy (born 1994), American soccer player
- Nick De Santis (born 1967), American soccer player
- Nick DeWolf (1928–2006), American entrepreneur
- Nick Diaz (born 1983), American mixed martial artist
- Nick DiCeglie (born 1973), American politician
- Nick DiDia (born 1962), American record producer, engineer, and mixer
- Nick Didkovsky (born 1958), American composer and guitarist
- Nick Digilio (born 1965), American movie critic and radio personality
- Nick Dimitri (born 1932), American stuntman
- Nick Dini (born 1993), American baseball player
- Nick Dinsmore (born 1975), American wrestler
- Nick Dioguardi (1932–2015), Italian racing driver
- Nick Di Paolo (born 1962), American comedian and radio personality
- Nick Dixon, Scottish journalist and television presenter
- Nick Dodge (born 1986), Canadian ice hockey player
- Nick Doodeman (born 1996), Dutch footballer
- Nick Dougherty (born 1982), English golfer
- Nick Douglas (born 1967), American musician
- Nick Downing (born 1980), American football player
- Nick Drake (1948–1974), English singer-songwriter and musician
- Nick Drnaso (born 1989), American author
- Nick Duigan (born 1984), Australian rules footballer
- Nick Dunning (born 1956/1957), English actor
- Nick Dupree (1982–2017), American disability rights activist and writer
- Nick D'Virgilio (born 1968), American musician
- Nick Dyer-Witheford (born 1951), Canadian author and professor
- Nick Dzubnar (born 1991), American football player
- Nick Earls (born 1963), Australian novelist
- Nick Easley (born 1997), American football player
- Nick Eason (born 1980), American football player
- Nick Easton (born 1992), American football player
- Nick Easter (born 1978), English rugby union player
- Nick Ebert (born 1994), American ice hockey player
- Nick Eddy (born 1944), American football player
- Nick Edwards (born 1984), Australian-American rugby union player
- Nick Eeles (born 1961), British army officer
- Nick Egan (born 1957), English visual designer
- Nick Ellis (born 1953), American professor of psychology and research scientist
- Nick Emmanwori (born 2004), American football player
- Nick Enright (1950–2003), Australian dramatist and playwright
- Nick Eppehimer (born 1979), American basketball player
- Nick Esasky (born 1960), American baseball player
- Nick Etten (1913–1990), American baseball player
- Nick Eubanks (born 1996), American football player
- Nick Evans (disambiguation), multiple people
- Nick Eversman (born 1986), American actor
- Nick Eyre (1959–2018), American football player
- Nick Fairley (born 1988), American football player
- Nick Falcon (born 1968), American musician
- Nick Faldo (born 1957), English golfer
- Nick Fazekas (born 1985), American basketball player
- Nick Fenton (born 1979), English footballer
- Nick Fenton-Wells (born 1986), South African rugby union footballer
- Nick Ferguson (born 1974), American football player
- Nick Ferrari (born 1959), British radio host
- Nick Fitzgerald (disambiguation), multiple people
- Nick Flynn (born 1960), American writer and poet
- Nick Foles (born 1989), American football player
- Nick Folk (born 1984), American football player
- Nick Ford (born 1999), American football player
- Nick Apollo Forte (1938–2020), American musician
- Nick Foster (disambiguation), multiple people
- Nick Fotiu (born 1952), American ice hockey player
- Nick Fowler (born 1967), American writer and musician
- Nick Freitas (born 1979), American politician and army veteran
- Nick Frost (born 1972), English actor, comedian, and screenwriter
- Nick Fry (born 1956), CEO of the Mercedes AMG Petronas Formula One team
- Nick Fuentes (born 1998), American far-right political commentator and podcaster
- Nick Fyffe (born 1972), English bassist
- Nick Gabaldon (1927–1951), American surfer
- Nick Gaetano, American cover artist
- Nick Gaffaney (born 1978), New Zealand drummer and singer
- Nick Gage (born 1980), wrestler
- Nick Galifianakis (disambiguation), multiple people
- Nick Gardewine (born 1993), American baseball player
- Nick Gargiulo (born 2000), American football player
- Nick Gates, American football player
- Nick Gates (cyclist)
- Nick Geber, English radio and television personality
- Nick Gehlfuss (born 1985), American actor
- Nick Gelavis (born 1929), Australian rules footballer
- Nick Gentry (born 1980), British artist
- Nick George (disambiguation), multiple people
- Nick Gevers (born 1965), South African editor and literary critic
- Nick Gibb (born 1960), British Conservative politician
- Nick Giles (born 1973), British businessman
- Nick Gill (born 1982), Australian football player
- Nick Gillard (born 1959), American stuntman
- Nick Gillespie (born 1963), American libertarian journalist
- Nick Glennie-Smith (born 1951), English film score composer
- Nick Goepper (born 1994), American freestyle skier
- Nick Goings (born 1978), American football player
- Nick Gomez (director) (born 1963), American film director and writer
- Nick Gonzales (born 1999), American baseball player
- Nick Goody (born 1991), American baseball player
- Nick Gordon (born 1995), American baseball player
- Nick Gore (born 1974), Finnish bass player
- Nick Gravenites (born 1938), American singer-songwriter
- Nick Green (disambiguation), multiple people
- Nick Greenwood (born 1987), American baseball player
- Nick Gregory (born 1960), American meteorologist
- Nick Greiner (born 1947), Australian businessman and politician
- Nick Greisen (born 1979), American football player
- Nick Griffin (born 1959), English politician
- Nick Griffin (comedian) (born 1966), American comedian
- Nick Grimshaw (born 1984), English television and radio presenter
- Nick Groff (born 1980), American paranormal investigator
- Nick Gross (born 1988), American entrepreneur
- Nick Gwiazdowski (born 1992), American wrestler
- Nick Haden (born 1962), American football player
- Nick Hague (born 1975), American astronaut
- Nick Hakim (born 1993), American musician
- Nick Hamm (born 1957), American film and television director
- Nick Hammond (born 1967), English footballer
- Nick Hanauer (born 1959), American entrepreneur
- Nick Hardwick (disambiguation), multiple people
- Nick Hardy (born 1996), American golfer
- Nick Harkaway (born 1972), British novelist
- Nick Harris (disambiguation), multiple people
- Nick Hartkop, lead singer of band McCafferty
- Nick Hayden (born 1986), American football player
- Nick Hawk (born 1981), American actor and reality television star
- Nick Heath (baseball) (born 1993), American baseball player
- Nick Hegarty (born 1986), English footballer
- Nick Heidfeld (born 1977), German racing driver
- Nick Hein (born 1984), German mixed martial artist
- Nick Helm (born 1980), English comedian
- Nick Hemming (born 1973), English musician and guitarist
- Nick Hendrix (born 1985), English actor
- Nick Hennessey (born 1986), American football player
- Nick Herbert (physicist) (born 1936), American physicist
- Nick Herbig (born 2001), American football player
- Nick Hewer (born 1944), English public relations consultant and television presenter
- Nick Hexum (born 1970), American musician and songwriter
- Nick Heyward (born 1961), English singer-songwriter
- Nick Hill (born 1985), American football player
- Nick Hinds (born 1997), American soccer player
- Nick Hipa (born 1982), American heavy metal guitarist
- Nick Hodgson (born 1977), English drummer and vocalist
- Nick Hoffman (born 1979), American singer-songwriter
- Nick Hogan (born 1990), American reality television personality and actor
- Nick Holden (born 1987), Canadian ice hockey player
- Nick Holder (born 1969), American hip-hop DJ
- Nick Holmes (disambiguation), multiple people
- Nick Holonyak (born 1928), American engineer and educator
- Nick Holt (born 1962), college football coach
- Nick Hornby (born 1957), English novelist, essayist, lyricist, and screenwriter
- Nick Howard (baseball) (born 1993), American baseball player
- Nick Howell (born 1980), American football coach
- Nick Hudson (born 1983), Australian rower
- Nick Hundley (born 1983), American baseball player
- Nick Hurd (born 1962), British Conservative Member of Parliament
- Nick Hurran (born 1959), British film and television director
- Nick Ienatsch (born 1961/1962), American motorcycle racer, writer, and instructor
- Nick Igel (born 1972), American soccer player
- Nick Inch (born 1984), Canadian lacrosse player
- Nick Ingels (born 1984), Belgian road bicycle racer
- Nick Ingman (born 1948), English arranger, composer, and conductor
- Nick Isiekwe (born 1998), English rugby union player
- Nick Ivanoff, American businessman
- Nick Jackson (American football) (born 2001), American football player
- Nick James (disambiguation), multiple people
- Nick Jameson (born 1950), American actor
- Nick Jardine (born 1943), British mathematician
- Nick Jeavons (born 1957), English rugby union player
- Nick Jenkins (born 1967), English businessman
- Nick Jennings (disambiguation), multiple people
- Nick Jensen (born 1990), American ice hockey player
- Nick Joaquin (1917–2004), Filipino writer, historian, and journalist
- Nick Johnson (disambiguation), multiple people
- Nick Jonas (born 1992), member of pop-rock band the Jonas Brothers
- Nick Jones (disambiguation), multiple people
- Nick Kaczur (born 1979), American football player
- Nick Kaiser (born 1954), British cosmologist
- Nick Kamen (1962–2021), English male model, songwriter, and musician
- Nick Kasa (born 1990), American football player
- Nick Katz (born 1943), American mathematician
- Nick Kay (born 1992), Australian basketball player
- Nick Keizer (born 1995), American football player
- Nick Kellington (born 1976), British actor and musician
- Nick Kellogg (born 1991), American basketball player
- Nick Kelly (cricketer) (born 1993), Australian-New Zealand cricketer
- Nick Kennedy (born 1982), English rugby union player
- Nick Kenny (disambiguation), multiple people
- Nick Kent (born 1951), British rock critic and musician
- Nick Kerr (born 1992), American basketball coach
- Nick D. Kim, cartoonist
- Nick King (disambiguation), multiple people
- Nick Kingham (born 1991), American baseball player
- Nick Kiriazis (born 1969), American television actor
- Nick Kisner (born 1991), American boxer
- Nick Knight (disambiguation), multiple people
- Nick Knowles (born 1962), English television presenter
- Nick Knox (1958–2018), American drummer
- Nick Kokonas (born 1968), American restaurant executive
- Nick Kolarac (born 1992), American soccer player
- Nick Kosir (born 1983), American meteorologist
- Nick Kotik (born 1950), Democratic member of the Pennsylvania House of Representatives
- Nick Kotys (1913–2005), American football coach
- Nick Kotz (1932–2020), American journalist and historian
- Nick Krause (born 1992), American film and television actor
- Nick Krall (born 1977), American baseball executive
- Nick Kroll (born 1978), American actor, screenwriter, producer, and comedian
- Nick Kwiatkoski (born 1993), American football player
- Nick Kypreos (born 1966), Canadian ice hockey player
- Nick Kyrgios (born 1995), Australian tennis player
- Nick Lachey (born 1973), American singer-songwriter, actor, producer, and television personality
- Nick Laird (born 1975), Northern Irish novelist and poet
- Nick Laird-Clowes (born 1957), English musician and composer
- Nick Lampson (born 1945), American politician
- Nick Land (born 1962), English philosopher
- Nick Lane (born 1967), British biochemist
- Nick Lappin (born 1992), American ice hockey player
- Nick Larkey (born 1998), Australian rules footballer
- Nick LaRocca (1889–1961), American jazz cornetist and trumpeter
- Nick Lashaway (1988–2016), American actor
- Nick Lassa (1898–1964), American football player
- Nick Launay (born 1960), English record producer, composer, and recording engineer
- Nick Lazzarini (born 1984), American dancer
- Nick Leddy (born 1991), American ice hockey player
- Nick Lee (disambiguation), multiple people
- Nick Leeson (born 1967), English trader
- Nick Leventis (born 1980), British racing driver
- Nick Leverett (born 1997), American football player
- Nick Leyva (born 1953), American baseball coach
- Nick Licata (disambiguation), multiple people
- Nick Lieberman, American filmmaker
- Nick Lima (born 1994), American soccer player
- Nick Littlemore (born 1978), Australian musician
- Nick Lodolo (born 1998), American baseball player
- Nick Loeb (born 1975), American businessman and actor
- Nick Loenen (born 1942 or 1943), Canadian politician
- Nick Loftin (born 1998), American baseball player
- Nick Loren (born 1970), American actor
- Nick Love (born 1969), English film director and writer
- Nick Lower (born 1987), Australian footballer
- Nick Lowery (born 1956), American football player
- Nick Lucas (1897–1982), American singer and jazz guitarist
- Nick Macpherson (born 1959), British civil servant
- Nick Madrigal (born 1997), American baseball player
- Nick Maley (born 1949), British make-up artist
- Nick Mamatas (born 1972), American author and editor
- Nick Mancuso (born 1948), Italian-Canadian actor
- Nick Mangold (born 1984), American football player
- Nick Mantis (1935–2017), American-Greek basketball player
- Nick Marck (born 1958), American television director
- Nick Mardner (born 1999), Canadian football player
- Nick Margevicius (born 1996), American baseball player
- Nick Markakis (born 1983), American baseball player
- Nick Marsh (American football) (born 2006), American football player
- Nick Marshall (born 1992), American football player
- Nick Martin (disambiguation), multiple people
- Nick Martinez (disambiguation), multiple people
- Nick Martini (born 1990), American baseball player
- Nick Mason (born 1944), English musician and composer
- Nick Masset (born 1982), American baseball player
- Nick Massi (1927–2000), American bass singer and bass guitarist
- Nick McArdle, Australian TV and radio presenter
- Nick McCabe (born 1971), English musician
- Nick McCarthy (born 1974), Scottish musician
- Nick McCloud (born 1998), American football player
- Nick McDonald (born 1987), American football player
- Nick McKenzie, Australian investigative journalist
- Nick McKeown, American professor
- Nick McKinnel (born 1954), English Anglican bishop
- Nick McLean (born 1941), American cinematographer
- Nick Mears (born 1996), American baseball player
- Nick Meglin (1935–2018), American writer and artist
- Nick Mennell (born 1976), American actor
- Nick Menza (1964–2016), American drummer
- Nick Metz (1914–1990), Canadian ice hockey player
- Nick Middleton (born 1960), British physical geographer
- Nick Mike-Mayer (born 1950), American football player
- Nick Miller (disambiguation), multiple people
- Nick Milroy (born 1974), American politician
- Nick Mira (born 2000), American record producer and songwriter
- Nick Mitchell (born 1982), American wrestler
- Nick Mohammed (born 1980), British actor and writer
- Nick Monaco, American DJ
- Nick Mondek (born 1988), American football player
- Nick Montana (born 1992), American football player
- Nick Montgomery (born 1981), English-Scottish footballer
- Nick George Montos (1916–2008), American criminal and gangster
- Nick Monroe (American football) (born 1979), American football player and coach
- Nick Moody (born 1990), American football player
- Nick Moore (American football) (born 1992), American football player
- Nick Moran (born 1969), English actor, writer, producer, and director
- Nick Moss (born 1969), American blues singer
- Nick Mourouzis (1937–2020), American football player and coach
- Nick Mullens (born 1995), American football player
- Nick Mulvey (born 1984), English musician
- Nick Muse (born 1998), American football player
- Nick Muszynski (born 1998), American basketball player
- Nick Mutuma (born 1988), Kenyan actor
- Nick Mwendwa (born 1979), Kenyan businessman
- Nick Nairn (born 1959), Scottish chef
- Nick Nanton (born 1980), Barbadian-American director and author
- Nick Nash (born 1999), American football player
- Nick Naumenko (born 1974), American ice hockey player
- Nick Navarro (dancer) (born 1938), Mexican-American former dancer and choreographer
- Nick Navarro (sheriff) (1929–2011), Cuban-American sheriff and businessman
- Nick Neidert (born 1996), American baseball player
- Nick Nelson (born 1996), American football player
- Nick Nelson (baseball) (born 1995), American baseball player
- Nick Neri (born 1995), American racing driver
- Nick Nero (born 1977), Canadian gangster
- Nick Nevern (born 1980), British actor and director
- Nick Newell (born 1986), American mixed martial artist
- Nick Nickell (born 1947), American bridge player
- Nick Nieland (born 1972), British javelin thrower
- Nick Niemann (born 1997), American football player
- Nick Noble (soccer) (born 1984), American soccer player
- Nick Noble (singer) (1926–2012), American singer
- Nick Nola (born 1985), Ugandan singer and dancer
- Nick Nolte (born 1941), American actor
- Nick Noonan (born 1989), baseball player
- Nick Novak (born 1981), American football player
- Nick Nuccio (1901–1989), American politician
- Nick Nurse (born 1967), American basketball coach
- Nick Nuyens (born 1980), Belgian road racing cyclist
- Nick O'Brien (born 1993), Australian footballer
- Nick O'Donnell (hurler) (1925–1988), Irish hurler
- Nick O'Donnell (footballer) (born 1993), Filipino footballer
- Nick Offerman (born 1970), American actor, writer, humorist, and carpenter
- Nick O'Hern (born 1971), Australian golfer
- Nick O'Leary (born 1992), American football player
- Nick Oliver (born 1991), American ice hockey coach
- Nick Oliveri (born 1971), American musician
- Nick O'Malley (born 1985), bass guitarist
- Nick Orr (born 1995), American football player
- Nick Oshiro (born 1978), American musician
- Nick Osipczak (born 1984), English professional mixed martial artist
- Nick Owen (born 1947), English television presenter and newsreader
- Nick Pace (born 1987), American professional mixed martial artist
- Nick Pacheco (born 1964), American lawyer and politician
- Nick Palatas (born 1988), American actor
- Nick Palmer (born 1950), British politician and computer scientist
- Nick Palmieri (born 1989), American ice hockey player
- Nick Park (born 1958), English director, writer, and animator
- Nick Patrick (disambiguation), multiple people
- Nick Patsaouras (born 1943), American urban planner
- Nick Paul (born 1995), Canadian ice hockey player
- Nick Paulos (born 1992), Greek-American basketball player
- Nick Payne (born 1984), British playwright
- Nick Perito (1924–2005), Hollywood composer and arranger
- Nick Perri (born 1984), guitarist, songwriter, and producer
- Nick Perry (disambiguation), multiple people
- Nick Peters (1939–2015), American baseball writer
- Nick Piantanida (1932–1966), American amateur parachute jumper
- Nick Pileggi, American journalist and screenwriter
- Nick Piccininni (born 1996), American folkstyle wrestler
- Nick Picciuto (1921–1997), American baseball player
- Nick Pitera (born 1986), American vocal artist
- Nick Pivetta (born 1993), American baseball player
- Nick Plott (born 1984), American eSports commentator
- Nick Polano (1941–2019), ice hockey coach
- Nick Pope (disambiguation), multiple people
- Nick Powell (born 1994), English footballer
- Nick Pratto (born 1998), American baseball player
- Nick Price (born 1957), Zimbabwean golfer
- Nick Prisco (1909–1981), American football player
- Nick Pugh (born 1967), American artist and designer
- Nick Punto (born 1977), American baseball player
- Nick Quartaro (born 1955), American football player and coach
- Nick Rahall (born 1949), American Democratic politician
- Nick Rakocevic (born 1997), American-Serbian basketball player
- Nick Ralston (born 1996), American football player
- Nick Ramirez (born 1989), American baseball player
- Nick Ramus (1929–2007), American actor
- Nick Raphael (born 1971), English music industry executive
- Nick Rapone (born 1956), American football coach
- Nick Raskulinecz (born 1970), American record producer
- Nick Rassas (born 1944), American football player
- Nick Rathod (born 1975), American businessman
- Nick Rattigan (born 1992), American singer-songwriter and vocalist
- Nick Read (born 1964), British businessman
- Nick Redfern (born 1964), British author and journalist
- Nick Reding (disambiguation), multiple people
- Nick Reed (born 1987), American football player
- Nick Rerras (born 1957), American politician
- Nick Revell, British comedian
- Nick Reynolds (1933–2008), American folk musician
- Nick Reynoldson, Canadian comedian
- Nick Rhodes (born 1962), English musician
- Nick Ricci (born 1959), Canadian ice hockey player
- Nick Richards (singer-songwriter) (born 1960), British singer-songwriter
- Nick Richards (born 1997), American basketball player
- Nick Richmond (born 1987), American football player
- Nick Rickles (born 1990), American-Israeli baseball player
- Nick Ries (born 1982), Australian footballer
- Nick Riewoldt (born 1982), Australian footballer
- Nick Rimando (born 1979), American soccer player
- Nick Ring (born 1979), American-Canadian mixed martial artist
- Nick Rivera (disambiguation), multiple people
- Nick Rizzo (born 1979), Australian footballer
- Nick Roach (born 1985), American football player
- Nick Roberts (disambiguation)
- Nick Robertson (disambiguation), multiple people
- Nick Robinson (disambiguation), multiple people
- Nick Rodriguez (born 1996), American grappler
- Nick Rogers (disambiguation), multiple people
- Nick Rolovich (born 1979), American football coach
- Nick Roman (1947–2003), American football player
- Nick Ronnenberg, American politician
- Nick Rose (disambiguation), multiple people
- Nick Ross (disambiguation), multiple people
- Nick Roth (born 1985), American screenwriter and actor
- Nick Rumbelow (born 1991), American baseball player
- Nick Rush (born 1968), American Republican politician
- Nick Russell (disambiguation), multiple people
- Nick Rutherford (born 1985), American actor and comedian
- Nick Saban (born 1951), American college football coach
- Nick Saenz (born 1990), American football player
- Nick Sagan (born 1970), American novelist and screenwriter
- Nick Saglimbeni, American visual artist
- Nick Sakiewicz (born 1961), American lacrosse executive
- Nick Saldiveri (born 2000), American football player
- Nick Samac (born 2001), American football player
- Nick Sandow (born 1966), American actor
- Nick Sauer (born 1982), American politician
- Nick Schifrin (born 1980), American news correspondent
- Nick Schmaltz (born 1996), American ice hockey player
- Nick Schulman (born 1984), American poker player
- Nick Sciba (born 1999), American football player
- Nick Scott (disambiguation), multiple people
- Nick Scotti (born 1966), American actor and singer
- Nick Searcy (born 1959), American actor
- Nick Seeler (born 1993), American ice hockey player
- Nick Seither (born 1993), American football player
- Nick Senzel (born 1995), American baseball player
- Nick Setta (born 1981), American football player
- Nick Seymour (born 1958), Australian musician
- Nick Sheppard (born 1960), British guitarist
- Nick Sheridan (born 1988), American football player and coach
- Nick Shirley (born 2002), American YouTuber
- Nick Sibbeston (born 1943), Canadian politician
- Nick Sidi (born 1966), English actor
- Nick Simmons (born 1989), American writer and son of Gene Simmons
- Nick Sinclair (born 1963), British photographer
- Nick Sirianni (born 1981), American football coach
- Nick Sirota (born 1984), American ice hockey player
- Nick Skelton (born 1957), British equestrian athlete
- Nick Skorich (1921–2004), American football player
- Nick Sogard (born 1997), American baseball player
- Nick Solak (born 1995), American baseball player
- Nick Solares (born 1968), British food writer
- Nick Soolsma (born 1988), Dutch footballer
- Nick Sorensen (born 1978), American football player and coach
- Nick Sousanis, American art critic and cartoonist
- Nick Spalding (born 1974), British novelist
- Nick Spencer (born 1967), American comic book writer
- Nick Spires (born 1994), English-Swedish basketball player
- Nick Srnicek (born 1982), Canadian writer
- Nick Stabile (born 1971), American actor
- Nick Stahl (born 1979), American actor
- Nick Stellino (born 1958), Italian-American television chef
- Nick Stevens (disambiguation), multiple people
- Nick Stewart (1910–2000), American television and film actor
- Nick Suban (born 1990), Australian football player
- Nick Sundberg (born 1987), American football player
- Nick Suriano (born 1997), American freestyle wrestler
- Nick Suzuki (born 1999), Canadian ice hockey player
- Nick Swardson (born 1976), American actor, comedian, screenwriter, and producer
- Nick Swiney (born 1999), American baseball player
- Nick Swinmurn, American entrepreneur
- Nick Swisher (born 1980), American baseball player
- Nick Symmonds (born 1983), American middle-distance track athlete
- Nick Szabo (born 1964), American computer scientist
- Nick Taitague (born 1999), American soccer player
- Nick Talbot (born 1965), British scientist
- Nick Tandy (born 1984), British racecar driver
- Nick Tanner (disambiguation), multiple people
- Nick E. Tarabay (born 1975), American actor
- Nick Tate (born 1942), Australian actor
- Nick Tatham (born 1983), British singer-songwriter
- Nick Tauber (born 1942), British record producer
- Nick Taylor (disambiguation), multiple people
- Nick Teo (born 1989), Singaporean television actor
- Nick Tepesch (born 1988), American baseball player
- Nick Thomas (disambiguation), multiple people
- Nick Thomas-Symonds (born 1980), Welsh politician
- Nick Thoman (born 1986), American swimmer
- Nick Thompson (disambiguation), multiple people
- Nick Thorpe (born 1960), British journalist and filmmaker
- Nick Thune (born 1979), American actor, comedian, and musician
- Nick Thurman (born 1995), American football player
- Nick Thurston (born 1987), American actor
- Nick Timothy (born 1980), British political advisor
- Nick Toczek (born 1950), British writer
- Nick Todd (born 1935), American pop singer
- Nick Toon (born 1988), American football player
- Nick Tosches (1949–2019), American journalist, novelist, biographer, and poet
- Nick Townsend (born 1994), English footballer
- Nick Traina (1978–1997), American singer
- Nick Trask (born 1978), Australian footballer
- Nick Tropeano (born 1990), American baseball player
- Nick Truesdell (born 1990), American football player
- Nick Turner, British drummer
- Nick Turvey (1931–2006), aerobatic and air show pilot in South Africa
- Nick Udall (1913–2005), mayor of Phoenix, Arizona, 1948–52
- Nick Uhas (born 1985), American TV host and actor
- Nick Ullett (born 1941), British-born American actor
- Nick Ut (born 1951), Vietnamese-American photographer for the Associated Press
- Nick Valensi (born 1981), American musician
- Nick Vallelonga (born 1959), American actor and producer
- Nick van der Velden (born 1981), Dutch footballer who played for Bali United
- Nick Van Eede (born 1958), English musician
- Nick Van Exel (born 1971), American basketball player and coach
- Nick Vannett (born 1993), American football player
- Nick Vanos (1963–1987), American basketball player
- Nick Varner (born 1948), American pool player
- Nick Vaux (born 1936), British officer
- Nick Veasey (born 1962), British photographer
- Nick Venet (1936–1998), American record producer
- Nick Verreos (born 1967), American fashion designer, fashion commentator, and Project Runway contestant
- Nick Viall (born 1980), American actor and TV personality
- Nick Viergever (born 1989), Dutch footballer
- Nick Vigil (born 1993), American football player
- Nick Vincent (disambiguation), multiple people
- Nick Virgilio (1928–1989), American haiku poet
- Nick Vlastuin (born 1994), Australian footballer
- Nick Volpe (born 1926), Canadian football player
- Nick von Esmarch (born 1976), American actor
- Nick Vujicic (born 1982), Australian Christian evangelist and motivational speaker
- Nick Voss, Australian artist
- Nick Wakeling (born 1971), Australian politician
- Nick Waisome (born 1992), American football player
- Nick Walker (disambiguation), multiple people
- Nick Walne (born 1975), Welsh rugby union player
- Nick Waplington (born 1965), British artist and photographer
- Nick Ward (disambiguation), multiple people
- Nick Warner (born 1950), Australian diplomat and public servant
- Nick Warren (born 1968), English house DJ and producer
- Nick Wasicsko (1959–1993), American politician
- Nick Waterhouse (born 1986), American singer-songwriter
- Nick Watney (born 1981), American golfer
- Nick Watt (CNN reporter), American news reporter
- Nick Weatherspoon (1950–2008), American basketball player
- Nick Webb (disambiguation), multiple people
- Nick Webster (born 1964), American soccer coach
- Nick Wechsler (disambiguation), multiple people
- Nick Weglarz (born 1987), Canadian baseball player
- Nick Weiler-Babb (born 1995), American basketball player
- Nick Wells (born 1951), American heavyweight boxer
- Nick Werkman (born 1942), American basketball player
- Nick West (disambiguation), multiple people
- Nick Westbrook-Ikhine (born 1997), American football player
- Nick Whale (born 1963), British racing driver
- Nick Whalen (born 1973), Canadian politician
- Nick Wheeler (born 1965), English businessman
- Nick Whitaker (born 1988), American actor
- Nick White (disambiguation), multiple people
- Nick Whiteside (born 2000), American football player
- Nick Whyatt (born 1984), English ice hockey player
- Nick Wickham, British film and television director
- Nick Wiger (born 1980), American comedian
- Nick Williams (disambiguation), multiple people
- Nick Willis (born 1983), New Zealand middle distance runner
- Nick Wirth (born 1966), automotive engineer and the founder and owner of Wirth Research
- Nick Wise (1866–1923), American baseball player
- Nick Woltemade (born 2002), German footballer
- Nick Wood (rugby union) (born 1983), English rugby footballer
- Nick Woodman (born 1975), American businessman
- Nick Wooster (born 1960), American fashion consultant
- Nick Wright (disambiguation), multiple people
- Nick Wyman (born 1950), American film and television actor
- Nick Xenophon (born 1959), senator for South Australia
- Nick Yakich (1940–2019), Australian rugby player
- Nick Yarris (born 1961), American writer and professional speaker
- Nick Yates, Australian entrepreneur
- Nick Yates (badminton) (born 1962), English badminton player
- Nick Yee, American researcher
- Nick Yelloly (born 1990), British racing driver
- Nick Yorke (born 2002), American baseball player
- Nick Yost (1915–1980), American basketball player
- Nick Young (disambiguation), multiple people
- Nick Youngquest (born 1983), Australian model and rugby player
- Nick Youngs (born 1985), English rugby player
- Nick Zakelj (born 1999), American football player
- Nick Zala (born 1959), pedal steel and guitar player
- Nick Zano (born 1978), American actor and producer
- Nick Zaricki, American politician
- Nick Zedd (born 1958), American filmmaker and author
- Nick Zeisloft (born 1992), American basketball player
- Nick Zerwas (born 1980), Minnesota politician
- Nick Zimmerman, (born 1987) American soccer player
- Nick Zinner (born 1974), guitarist for the rock band Yeah Yeah Yeahs
- Nick Zisti (born 1972), Italian Australian rugby player
- Nick Zito (born 1948), American thoroughbred horse trainer
- Nick Zoricic (born 1983), Canadian ski cross skier

== Fictional characters ==
- Nick Amaro, in the television series Law & Order: Special Victims Unit
- Nick Burkhardt, in the television series Grimm
- Nick Carraway, the protagonist of the novel The Great Gatsby
- Nick Charles, a private investigator in the novel The Thin Man and various films
- Nick Fury, a Marvel Comics character
- Nick Fury Jr., a Marvel Comics character
- Nick O'Bannon, in the film The Final Destination
- Dr. Nick Riviera, in The Simpsons
- Nick Stokes, in the television series CSI: Crime Scene Investigation
- Nick Torres, in the television series NCIS
- Nick Valentine, a synth private detective and companion in Fallout 4
- Phoenix "Nick" Wright, the protagonist of the Ace Attorney game series

== See also ==
- Nickelodeon, commonly shortened to "Nick"
- "Nick", police pseudonym for criminal Carl Beech
- Nik, given name
- Nix (disambiguation)
- "Old Nick", a nickname for The Devil
- Saint Nicholas (often referred to as "St. Nick"), Bishop of Myra
