= Nicholas Martinez =

Nicholas Martinez, Nicolás Martínez, or Nick Martinez may refer to:

- Nick Martinez (baseball) (born 1990), American professional baseball player
- Nicolás Martínez (footballer, born 1984), Argentine defender
- Nicolás Martínez (footballer, born 1986), Argentine defender
- Nicolás Martínez (footballer, born 1987), Argentine midfielder
- Nicolás Martínez (footballer, born 1989), Paraguayan forward
- Nicolás Martínez (footballer, born 1991), Argentine forward
- Nicolás Martínez (footballer, born 1992), Argentine forward
- Nicolás Martínez (footballer, born 1997), Uruguayan defender
- Nicolás Martínez (footballer, born 1998), Uruguayan goalkeeper
