= McWilliams =

McWilliams is a surname. Notable people with the surname include:

- Alfred McWilliams (1844–1928), Canadian politician from Prince Edward Island
- Bill McWilliams (1910–1997), American baseball player
- Brendan McWilliams (1944–2007), Irish meteorologist and science writer
- Carey McWilliams (journalist) (1905–1980), American author, editor, and lawyer
- Carey McWilliams (marksman) (b. 1973), American author, marksman, and skydiver
- Caroline McWilliams (1945–2010), American television actress; former wife of Michael Keaton
- Christopher 'Crip' McWilliams (1963–2008), Irish nationalist; convicted of the murder of the LVF leader Billy Wright
- Cynthia Kaye McWilliams (contemporary), American actress
- David McWilliams (American football) (contemporary), American college football coach
- David McWilliams (economics pundit) (b. 1966), Irish economist, commentator, and author
- David McWilliams (musician) (1945–2002), Northern Irish singer, songwriter, and guitarist
- Derek McWilliams (b. 1966), Scottish football player
- Diana McWilliams, American politician
- Douglas McWilliams (born 1951), British economist
- Edmund McWilliams (contemporary), American diplomat and ambassador
- Elsie McWilliams (1896–1985), American songwriter
- Eric McWilliams (b. 1950), American basketball player
- Fleming McWilliams (contemporary), American singer and songwriter
- Francis McWilliams (1926–2022), Scottish engineer and Lord Mayor of London
- George McWilliams (1865–1907), Australian doctor and MP
- Jackie McWilliams (b. 1964), Irish Olympic field hockey player
- Jelena McWilliams (b. 1973), U.S. banker, nominee to lead Federal Deposit Insurance Corporation (FDIC)
- Jeremy McWilliams (b. 1964), Irish motorcycle road racer
- Joe McWilliams (1904–1996), American inventor, industrial engineer, and nationalist
- John D. McWilliams (1891–1975), American politician from Connecticut; U.S. Representative 1943–45
- Johnny McWilliams (b. 1972), American football player
- Julia Carolyn McWilliams, birth name of American cooking teacher, author, and television personality Julia Child
- Larry McWilliams (b. 1954), American baseball player
- Mac McWilliams (b. 2001), American football player
- Monica McWilliams (b. 1954), Northern Ireland academic and politician
- Nancy McWilliams, American psychoanalyst and writer
- Peter McWilliams (1949–2000), American marijuana activist and writer
- Rhys McWilliams (b. 1985), English ice hockey player
- Roland Fairbairn McWilliams (1874–1957), Canadian politician from Manitoba
- Rube McWilliams (1901–1984), New Zealand rugby player
- Shorty McWilliams (1926–1997), American football player
- Taj McWilliams-Franklin (b. 1970), American women's basketball player
- Taylor McWilliams (born 1980/1981), American real estate developer
- William McWilliams (1856–1929), Australian politician from Tasmania
- Wilson Carey McWilliams (1933–2005), American political scientist and writer

== Fictional characters ==
- Lally McWilliams, a fictional character in the anime Gundam SEED DESTINY
