= Denver Butler =

American politician

Member of the Kentucky House of Representatives from the 38th district
- In office January 1, 2013 – January 1, 2017
- Preceded by: Michael J. Nemes
- Succeeded by: McKenzie Cantrell

Personal details
- Born: April 1, 1970 (age 56) Jefferson County, Kentucky
- Party: Republican (since 2015); Democratic (until 2015)
- Education: Jefferson Community College; University of Louisville (B.A.) (B.S.)
- Profession: politician
- Website: votedennybutler.com

Denver Earl Butler Jr. (born April 1, 1970) is an American politician and a former Republican member of the Kentucky House of Representatives. Butler represented District 38 from January 2013 to January 2017.

== Education ==
Butler attended Jefferson Community College (now Jefferson Community and Technical College), and earned his BA and BS in justice administration from the University of Louisville. His father, Denver Butler Sr. served in the House of Representatives for District 38 from 1989 to 2007.

== Elections ==
- 2016 Butler was unopposed in the Republican Primary and lost to Democratic nominee McKenzie Cantrell 7,600 votes (50.87%) to 7,341 votes (49.13%).

On November 19, 2015, Butler announced he was switching parties and filing for re-election as a Republican.

- 2014 Butler was unopposed in the Democratic Primary and the general election.
- 2012 To challenge District 38 incumbent Republican Representative Michael J. Nemes, Butler was unopposed for the May 22, 2012, Democratic Primary and won the November 6, 2012, general election, with 7,893 votes (59.2%) against Representative Nemes.
