= Nicholas John Robinson =

Nicholas John Robinson may refer to:

- Nick Robinson (American actor) (born 1995), American actor
- Nicky Robinson (rugby union) (born 1982), Welsh rugby player

== See also ==
- Nick Robinson (disambiguation)
