= Firkins (surname) =

Firkins is a surname. Notable people with the surname include:

- Christine Firkins (born 1983), Canadian teacher and actress
- Michael Lee Firkins (born 1967), American guitarist
- Seth Firkins (1981–2017), American audio engineer
- Tim Firkins (born 1948), American politician
