= Nicholas Baker =

Nicholas or Nick Baker may refer to:

- Nick Baker (business executive), Australian business executive
- Nicholas Baker (cyclist) (born 1957), Caymanian cyclist
- Nick Baker (Kentucky politician) (1937–2026), American politician, member of the Kentucky Senate
- Nicholas Baker (politician) (1938–1997), British Member of Parliament and government minister
- Nick Baker (naturalist) (born 1972), English naturalist and television presenter
- Nicholas Baker (rower) (born 1985), Australian lightweight rower
- Nicholas John Baker, British citizen who was convicted of smuggling cocaine and ecstasy into Japan
- Niels Bohr (1885–1962), who assumed the name "Nicholas Baker" while working on the Manhattan Project

== See also ==
- Nicholson Baker (born 1957), American novelist
- Nicholas Robinson-Baker (born 1987), English diver
- Nick Barker (disambiguation)
