= The Park School =

Coordinates: 42°18′56.36″N 71°07′59.57″W

Location
- 171 Goddard Avenue; Brookline, Massachusetts 02445; United States

Information
- School type: Independent, coeducational, non-profit, non-sectarian day school Independent Elementary and Middle School
- Motto: Simplicity and Sincerity
- Denomination: Non-denominational
- Founded: 1888
- Chairperson: Amanda Teo
- Head of school: Scott M. Young
- Staff: 30
- Faculty: 140
- Grades: PreKindergarten-Grade 8
- Age range: 4-14
- Enrollment: 560
- Average class size: 14–16 students
- Language: English
- Campus size: 34 acres (140,000 m^{2})
- Colors: green & white
- Accreditation: AISNE & NEASC
- Publication: The Park School Bulletin
- Newspaper: Park Perspectives (formerly The Park Parent)
- Website: http://www.parkschool.org

The Park School is a private day school in Brookline, Massachusetts, United States. Founded in 1888 as Miss Pierce's School, it is located on a 34-acre campus near Jamaica Pond, and provides pre-Kindergarten through eighth-grade education for boys and girls.

== History ==
The Park School was founded in 1888, when Caroline Augusta Pierce opened a school for children from neighboring families at 346–348 Walnut Street in Brookline. During its first year, the school consisted of Pierce, her assistant Edith Weston, and 16 students.

In 1905, the school moved to a purpose-built schoolhouse designed by the Boston architectural firm Wheelwright & Haven.

Under Pierce's successor, Julia Park, the school became known as Miss Park's School. It was formally incorporated as The Park School in 1923 and named in Park's honor.

In 1971, the school relocated to its current campus on Goddard Avenue. The move was made possible by a donation of land from James and Mary Faulkner.

== Campus and architecture ==
The main building on the Goddard Avenue campus was designed by architect Earl R. Flansburgh and completed in 1971.

The building is constructed primarily from reinforced precast concrete and is associated with Brutalist architecture.

An interior courtyard contains Space Churn, a stainless-steel kinetic sculpture by American artist George Rickey.

== Program ==
The Park School is composed of two divisions; Lower Division (PreK-Grade 4) and Upper Division (Grades 5-8).

== Notable alumni ==
Notable graduates of The Park School include:

- Ty Burr: film critic, The Boston Globe
- Bertha Coombs: reporter, CNBC
- Michael Cox: professional football player
- Evan Dando: lead singer, The Lemonheads
- Loren Galler-Rabinowitz: Miss Massachusetts 2011
- Tucker Halpern: Grammy Nominated musician Sofi Tukker
- Joseph Kahn: editor, New York Times
- Jonathan Kraft: President, New England Patriots
- Elliot Richardson: U.S. Attorney General
- George Schuller: jazz drummer, son of composer/conductor Gunther Schuller
- Chris Tierney: professional soccer player, New England Revolution
- Jonathan Tucker: actor
- David Walton: actor
- W. Kamau Bell: comedian
- Stu McNay: athlete, Olympic sailor
- Nicholas Thompson: editor, author
