= Nicky Lee =

Nicky Lee may refer to:

- Nicky Lee (author)
- Nicky Lee (singer)
- Nicky Lee (priest)

== See also ==
- Nick Lee (disambiguation)
