= Franco Manca =

Pizza business

- Type: Pizzeria
- Founded: 2008, Brixton Market, London, England
- Founder: Giuseppe Mascoli
- Area served: Greece; United Kingdom; Salina; Spain
- Products: Sourdough Pizza and Salads
- Parent: The Fulham Shore
- Website: francomanca.co.uk

Franco Manca is a sourdough Neapolitan pizza business operating around 70 pizzerias in the UK. It was founded in 2008 by Giuseppe Mascoli and Bridget Hugo. The first restaurant opened on Market Row in Brixton Market. Initially sites were in the London metropolitan area, then the company opened in Italy with a summer pizzeria on the island of Salina to the north of Sicily. Since then the company has opened restaurants in many English cities; Brighton, Bath, Bristol, Cambridge, Leeds, Manchester and Oxford. These were followed by Glasgow and Edinburgh in Scotland and in the centre of the Welsh capital Cardiff. Franco Manca opened a pizzeria in Malaga Spain in April 2023. Franco Manca was named the UK's best Italian Restaurant on Yelp. Franco Manca's menu consists of pizza with various meat and vegetarian options. It uses a traditional Neapolitan soft base.

In November 2022, Franco Manca launched a range of chilled cook-at-home pizzas in 500 UK Tesco stores, after licensing its brand to food manufacturers Rondanini.

== Name ==
The original 1986 Brixton pizzeria was called Franco’s, named after its owner. After Mascoli and Hugo took it over in 2008 they renamed it Franco Manca ("Franco is missing").

== Ownership ==
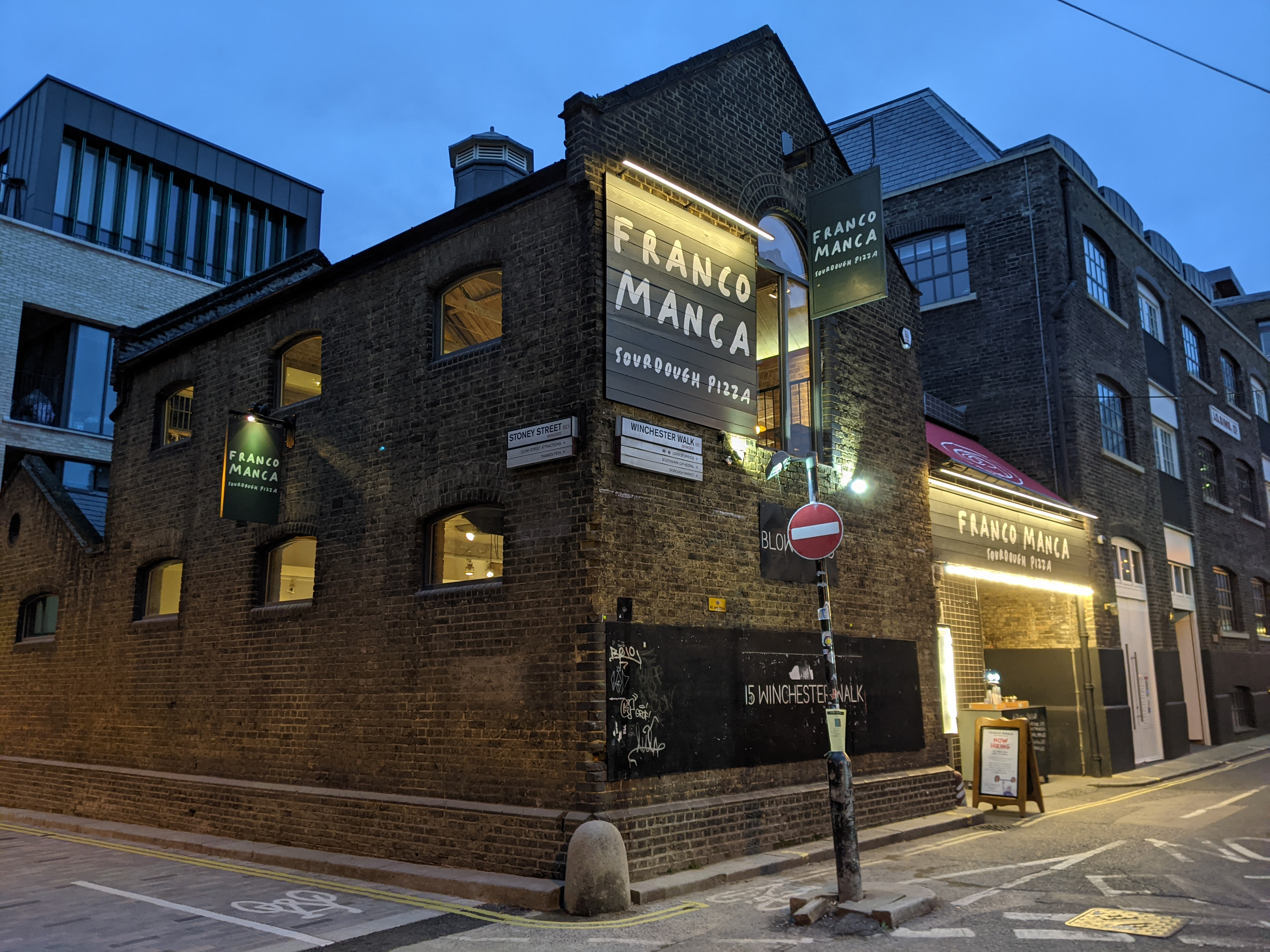
Franco Manca restaurant in London

In March 2015, Franco Manca was purchased by The Fulham Shore, which also owns "The Real Greek". The company was publicly listed on the London Stock Exchange AIM market and was operated by Giuseppe Mascoli, David Page, Nabil Mankarious, and David Sykes, who all had significant stakes in the company. In July 2017 they said that the uncertainty over Brexit was 'already affecting the availability of skilled European restaurant staff'. In July 2018 they stated in the company report that more than 50% of the people who worked in the business held shares in the company.

In April 2023 Fulham Shore agreed to sell Franco Manca and The Real Greek to Toridoll the Japanese owner of Marugame Udon for £93.4m.
