= Kentucky's 38th House of Representatives district =

American legislative district

Kentucky's 38th State House of Representatives district
Representative
Rachel Roarx; D–Louisville
since January 1, 2023
- Registration: 54.8% Democratic; 33.1% Republican; 11.6% No party preference
- Demographics: 60.0% White; 14.4% Black; 11.8% Hispanic; 5.0% Asian; 0.1% Native American; 0.4% Other; 8.4% Multiracial
- Population (2024): 46,638
- Registered voters (2026): 30,592

Kentucky's 38th House of Representatives district is one of 100 districts in the Kentucky House of Representatives. It comprises part of Jefferson County. It has been represented by Rachel Roarx (D–Louisville) since 2023. As of 2024, the district had a population of 46,638.

== Voter registration ==
On January 1, 2026, the district had 30,592 registered voters, who were registered with the following parties.

Party	Registration	
Party	Voters	%
Democratic	16,776	54.84
Republican	10,113	33.06
Independent	1,512	4.94
Libertarian	126	0.41
Green	20	0.07
Constitution	9	0.03
Socialist Workers	5	0.02
Reform	5	0.02
"Other"	2,026	6.62
Total	30,592	100.00

== List of members representing the district ==
Member	Party	Years	Electoral history	District location
Dan Seum (Louisville)	Democratic	January 1, 1982 – January 1, 1989	Elected in 1981. Reelected in 1984. Reelected in 1986. Retired to run for the Kentucky Senate.	1974–1985; Jefferson County (part).
Dan Seum (Louisville)	Democratic	January 1, 1982 – January 1, 1989	Elected in 1981. Reelected in 1984. Reelected in 1986. Retired to run for the Kentucky Senate.	1985–1993; Jefferson County (part).
Denver Butler Sr. (Louisville)	Democratic	January 1, 1989 – January 1, 2007	Elected in 1988. Reelected in 1990. Reelected in 1992. Reelected in 1994. Reelected in 1996. Reelected in 1998. Reelected in 2000. Reelected in 2002. Reelected in 2004. Retired.	1985–1993; Jefferson County (part).
Denver Butler Sr. (Louisville)	Democratic	January 1, 1989 – January 1, 2007	Elected in 1988. Reelected in 1990. Reelected in 1992. Reelected in 1994. Reelected in 1996. Reelected in 1998. Reelected in 2000. Reelected in 2002. Reelected in 2004. Retired.	1993–1997; Jefferson County (part).
Denver Butler Sr. (Louisville)	Democratic	January 1, 1989 – January 1, 2007	Elected in 1988. Reelected in 1990. Reelected in 1992. Reelected in 1994. Reelected in 1996. Reelected in 1998. Reelected in 2000. Reelected in 2002. Reelected in 2004. Retired.	1997–2003
Denver Butler Sr. (Louisville)	Democratic	January 1, 1989 – January 1, 2007	Elected in 1988. Reelected in 1990. Reelected in 1992. Reelected in 1994. Reelected in 1996. Reelected in 1998. Reelected in 2000. Reelected in 2002. Reelected in 2004. Retired.	2003–2015
Tim Firkins (Louisville)	Democratic	January 1, 2007 – January 1, 2011	Elected in 2006. Reelected in 2008. Lost reelection.	2003–2015
Michael J. Nemes (Louisville)	Republican	January 1, 2011 – January 1, 2013	Elected in 2010. Lost reelection.	2003–2015
Denver Butler (Louisville)	Democratic	January 1, 2013 – November 19, 2015	Elected in 2012. Reelected in 2014. Lost reelection.	2003–2015
Denver Butler (Louisville)	Democratic	January 1, 2013 – November 19, 2015	Elected in 2012. Reelected in 2014. Lost reelection.	2015–2023
Denver Butler (Louisville)	Republican	November 19, 2015 – January 1, 2017	Elected in 2012. Reelected in 2014. Lost reelection.	2015–2023
McKenzie Cantrell (Louisville)	Democratic	January 1, 2017 – January 1, 2023	Elected in 2016. Reelected in 2018. Reelected in 2020. Retired to run for the Kentucky Court of Appeals after being redistricted to the 35th district.	2015–2023
Rachel Roarx (Louisville)	Democratic	January 1, 2023 – present	Elected in 2022. Reelected in 2024. Reelected in 2026.	2023–present
