= Rachel Roarx =

American politician

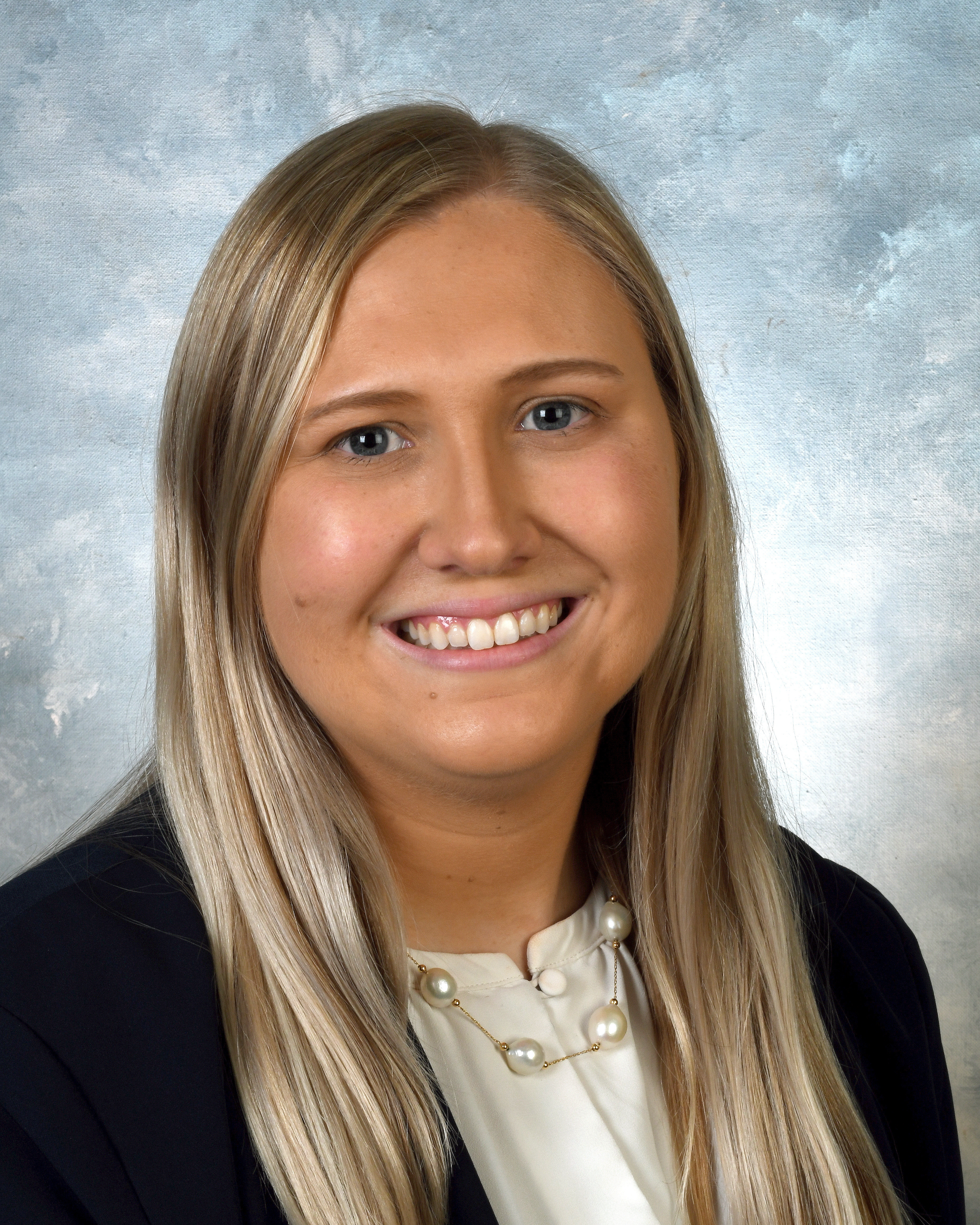

Member of the Kentucky House of Representatives from the 38th district
- Incumbent
- Assumed office January 1, 2023
- Preceded by: McKenzie Cantrell

Personal details
- Born: March 25, 1997 (age 29)
- Party: Democratic

Rachel Gene Roarx (/ˈrɔːrks/ RORKS; born March 25, 1997) is an American politician who serves in the Kentucky House of Representatives from the 38th district since January 1, 2023.

== Legislation ==
Since 2023, Roarx has been a primary sponsor of the following bills which have been considered by at least one house:

Bill	Title	House Vote	Senate Vote	Governor	Ky. Acts
23 HB 191	An act relating to vacancies in office	Passed 90–0	Passed 35–0	Signed	2023 c. 97

== Electoral history ==
=== 2022 ===
2022 Kentucky House of Representatives 38th district election
Party	Candidate	Votes	%
Democratic	Rachel Roarx	6,522	51.5
Republican	Charles Breitenbach	6,146	48.5
Total votes		12,668	100.0
Democratic hold			

=== 2024 ===
2024 Kentucky House of Representatives 38th district election
Party	Candidate	Votes	%
Democratic	Rachel Roarx (incumbent)	8,743	50.7
Republican	Carrie Sanders McKeehan	8,494	49.3
Total votes		17,237	100.0
Democratic hold			
