= Danny Meyer (politician) =

American politician

Member of the Kentucky Senate from the 38th district
- In office January 1, 1978 – August 1, 1994
- Preceded by: Nick Baker
- Succeeded by: Dan Seum

Personal details
- Born: March 16, 1936
- Died: May 4, 2016 (aged 80)
- Party: Democratic

Daniel J. Meyer (March 16, 1936 – May 4, 2016) was an American politician from Kentucky who was a member of the Kentucky Senate from 1978 to 1994. Meyer was first elected in 1977, defeating incumbent senator Nick Baker for renomination. He resigned from the senate in August 1994.

He died in May 2016 at age 80.
