= Nick Scott =

Nick or Nicholas Scott may refer to:

- Sir Nicholas Scott (1933–2005), British politician
- Nick Scott (bodybuilder), American bodybuilder
- Nick Scott (rugby union) (born 1990), English rugby union player
- Nick Scott (American football) (born 1995), American football player
- Nick Scott, English actor, known for One Foot in the Grave
