= Nik =

Nik is a gender-neutral given name and used as a diminutive of feminine given names such as Nicole and a male nickname derived from the Ancient Greek word νίκη (nike), meaning 'victory'.

The name Nik is a shortened form that has several origins. One of the interpretations is that the name comes from Nike, the mythological goddess of victory. In another interpretation it is an abbreviation of the name Nikat, which means 'spiritual man', and according to a third interpretation it is a derivative of the names Nike or Nikica, which refer to victory. Sometimes the name is a diminutive of Dominic, which means 'one who belongs to God'.

In the Kelantan state of Malaysia and the Pattani province of Thailand, Nik is an inherited title from Malay نينيق ninik or nenek "grandparent".

Notable people with the given name or nickname include:

- Nik Bärtsch (born 1971), Swiss pianist, composer and producer
- Nik Bonitto (born 1999), American football player
- Nik Caner-Medley (born 1983), American basketball player
- Nik Cohn (born 1946), British rock journalist
- Nik Constantinou (born 1999), Australian-American football player
- Nik Dean, American politician
- Nik Kershaw (born 1958), English singer-songwriter, composer, musician and record producer
- Nik Lewis (born 1982), American gridiron football player and coach
- Nik Needham (born 1996), American football player
- Nik Omladič (born 1989), Slovenian footballer
- Nik Richie (born Hooman Karamian in 1979), American blogger, author and Internet personality
- Nik Stauskas (born 1993), Canadian National Basketball Association player
- Nik Turner (1940–2022), English musician
- Nik Wallenda (born 1979), American acrobat, aerialist, daredevil, high wire artist and author
- Nik Welter (1871–1951), Luxembourgish writer and politician
- Nik Xhelilaj (born 1983), Albanian film and stage actor
- Nik Zagranitchni (born 1969), Israeli Olympic wrestler
- Nik Abdul Aziz Nik Mat (1931–2015), Malaysian politician and Muslim cleric
- Nik Ahmad Fadly Nik Leh (born 1977), Malaysian footballer
- Nik Nazmi Nik Ahmad (born 1982), Malaysian politician
- Nik Shahrul Azim Abdul Halim (born 1990), Malaysian footballer
- Cristian Dzwonik (born 1971), Argentinean cartoonist better known as Nik, creator of Gaturro
- one half of the Danish R&B/hip-hop/pop duo Nik & Jay, real name Niclas Genckel Petersen
- Nik P., Austrian schlager singer Nikolaus Presnik (born 1962)

== See also ==
- Nick (given name)
