= McKenzie Cantrell =

American politician (born 1987)

Member of the Kentucky House of Representatives from the 38th district
- In office January 1, 2017 – January 1, 2023
- Preceded by: Denver Butler
- Succeeded by: Rachel Roarx

Personal details
- Born: July 17, 1987 (age 39) Columbia, Tennessee
- Party: Democratic

McKenzie Louise Cantrell (born July 17, 1987) is an American politician who previously served in the Kentucky House of Representatives from the 38th district from January 2017 to January 2023. She was first elected in 2016, defeating Republican incumbent Denver Butler. In 2022 she retired to unsuccessfully run for the Kentucky Court of Appeals.
