= Nicky Evans (disambiguation) =

Nicky Evans (born 1979) is an English actor.

Nicky Evans may also refer to:

- Nicky Evans (footballer) (born 1958), English footballer
- Niki Evans, contestant on series 4 of the British The X Factor
- Nikki Evans or Nicola Evans (born 1990), Irish field hockey player

== See also ==
- Nick Evans (disambiguation)
