= Kentucky's 38th Senate district =

American legislative district

Kentucky's 38th State Senate district
Senator
| Michael J. Nemes; R–Shepherdsville |
since January 28, 2020
- Registration: 51.1% Republican; 37.4% Democratic; 10.9% No party preference
- Demographics: 84.8% White; 5.3% Black; 5.0% Hispanic; 1.3% Asian; 0.4% Other; 3.3% Multiracial
- Population (2023): 117,332
- Registered voters (2025): 91,075

Kentucky's 38th Senatorial district is one of 38 districts in the Kentucky Senate. It comprises Bullitt County, as well as part of Jefferson. It has been represented by Michael J. Nemes (R–Shepherdsville) since 2020. As of 2023, the district had a population of 117,332.

== Voter registration ==
On January 1, 2025, the district had 91,075 registered voters, who were registered with the following parties.

| Party | Registration | |
| Party | Voters | % |
|---|---|---|
| Republican | 46,508 | 51.07 |
| Democratic | 34,104 | 37.45 |
| Independent | 4,229 | 4.64 |
| Libertarian | 457 | 0.50 |
| Green | 67 | 0.07 |
| Constitution | 35 | 0.04 |
| Socialist Workers | 13 | 0.01 |
| Reform | 8 | 0.01 |
| "Other" | 5,654 | 6.21 |
| Total | 91,075 | 100.00 |
Source: Kentucky State Board of Elections

== Election results from statewide races ==
=== 2022 – present ===
| Year | Office | Results (Note: Figures presented in this table are calculated by summing precinct election results published by the Kentucky State Board of Elections, using precinct data that list each precinct's senatorial district.) |
|---|---|---|
| 2022 | Senator | Paul 66.9 - 33.1% |
| 2022 | Amendment 1 | No 54.1 - 45.9% |
| 2022 | Amendment 2 | No 54.0 - 46.0% |
| 2023 | Governor | Cameron 52.5 - 47.5% |
| 2023 | Secretary of State | Adams 64.5 - 35.5% |
| 2023 | Attorney General | Coleman 64.2 - 35.8% |
| 2023 | Auditor of Public Accounts | Ball 65.6 - 34.4% |
| 2023 | State Treasurer | Metcalf 62.8 - 37.2% |
| 2023 | Commissioner of Agriculture | Shell 64.3 - 35.7% |
| 2024 | President | Trump 69.6 - 28.9% |
| 2024 | Amendment 1 | Yes 65.7 - 34.3% |
| 2024 | Amendment 2 | No 59.6 - 40.4% |

== List of members representing the district ==
| Member | Party | Years | Electoral history | District location |
|---|---|---|---|---|
| Vernon McGinty (Louisville) | Republican | January 1, 1962 – January 1, 1970 | Elected in 1961. Reelected in 1965. Lost reelection. | 1944–1964; Jefferson County (part). |
| Vernon McGinty (Louisville) | Republican | January 1, 1962 – January 1, 1970 | Elected in 1961. Reelected in 1965. Lost reelection. | 1964–1972 |
| Nick Baker (Louisville) | Democratic | January 1, 1970 – January 1, 1978 | Elected in 1969. Reelected in 1973. Lost renomination. | 1964–1972 |
| Nick Baker (Louisville) | Democratic | January 1, 1970 – January 1, 1978 | Elected in 1969. Reelected in 1973. Lost renomination. | 1972–1974 |
| Nick Baker (Louisville) | Democratic | January 1, 1970 – January 1, 1978 | Elected in 1969. Reelected in 1973. Lost renomination. | 1974–1984 |
| Danny Meyer (Louisville) | Democratic | January 1, 1978 – August 1, 1994 | Elected in 1977. Reelected in 1981. Reelected in 1986. Reelected in 1990. Resigned. | 1974–1984 |
| Danny Meyer (Louisville) | Democratic | January 1, 1978 – August 1, 1994 | Elected in 1977. Reelected in 1981. Reelected in 1986. Reelected in 1990. Resigned. | 1984–1993; Jefferson County (part). |
| Danny Meyer (Louisville) | Democratic | January 1, 1978 – August 1, 1994 | Elected in 1977. Reelected in 1981. Reelected in 1986. Reelected in 1990. Resigned. | 1993–1997 |
| Dan Seum (Louisville) | Democratic | January 1, 1995 – July 12, 1999 | Elected in 1994. Reelected in 1998. Reelected in 2002. Reelected in 2006. Reelected in 2010. Reelected in 2014. Reelected in 2018. Resigned. | 1993–1997 |
| Dan Seum (Louisville) | Democratic | January 1, 1995 – July 12, 1999 | Elected in 1994. Reelected in 1998. Reelected in 2002. Reelected in 2006. Reelected in 2010. Reelected in 2014. Reelected in 2018. Resigned. | 1997–2003 |
| Dan Seum (Louisville) | Republican | July 12, 1999 – November 16, 2019 | Elected in 1994. Reelected in 1998. Reelected in 2002. Reelected in 2006. Reelected in 2010. Reelected in 2014. Reelected in 2018. Resigned. | 1997–2003 |
| Dan Seum (Louisville) | Republican | July 12, 1999 – November 16, 2019 | Elected in 1994. Reelected in 1998. Reelected in 2002. Reelected in 2006. Reelected in 2010. Reelected in 2014. Reelected in 2018. Resigned. | 2003–2015 |
| Dan Seum (Louisville) | Republican | July 12, 1999 – November 16, 2019 | Elected in 1994. Reelected in 1998. Reelected in 2002. Reelected in 2006. Reelected in 2010. Reelected in 2014. Reelected in 2018. Resigned. | 2015–2023 |
| Michael J. Nemes (Shepherdsville) | Republican | January 28, 2020 – present | Elected to finish Seum's term. Reelected in 2022. Reelected in 2026. | 2015–2023 |
| Michael J. Nemes (Shepherdsville) | Republican | January 28, 2020 – present | Elected to finish Seum's term. Reelected in 2022. Reelected in 2026. | 2023–present |
