= Nicholas Charles (disambiguation) =

Nicholas Charles (died 1613) was an English officer-at-arms.

Nic(h)olas or Nick Charles may also refer to:

== People ==
- Nicholas Charles, actor in 1988 British film The Kitchen Toto
- Nicholas Charles (athlete), participated in 2002 Leeward Islands Junior Championships in Athletics
- Nick Charles (author) (born 1945), British author and alcoholism treatment expert
- Nick Charles (guitarist), Australian guitarist, performed at the Melbourne Guitar Show
- Nick Charles (politician) (born 1982), Maryland State Senator
- Nick Charles (sportscaster) (1946–2011), American sportscaster

== Fictional characters ==
- Nick Charles, fictional character in the novel The Thin Man and adapted for film
