= Marugame Seimen =

Japanese restaurant chain

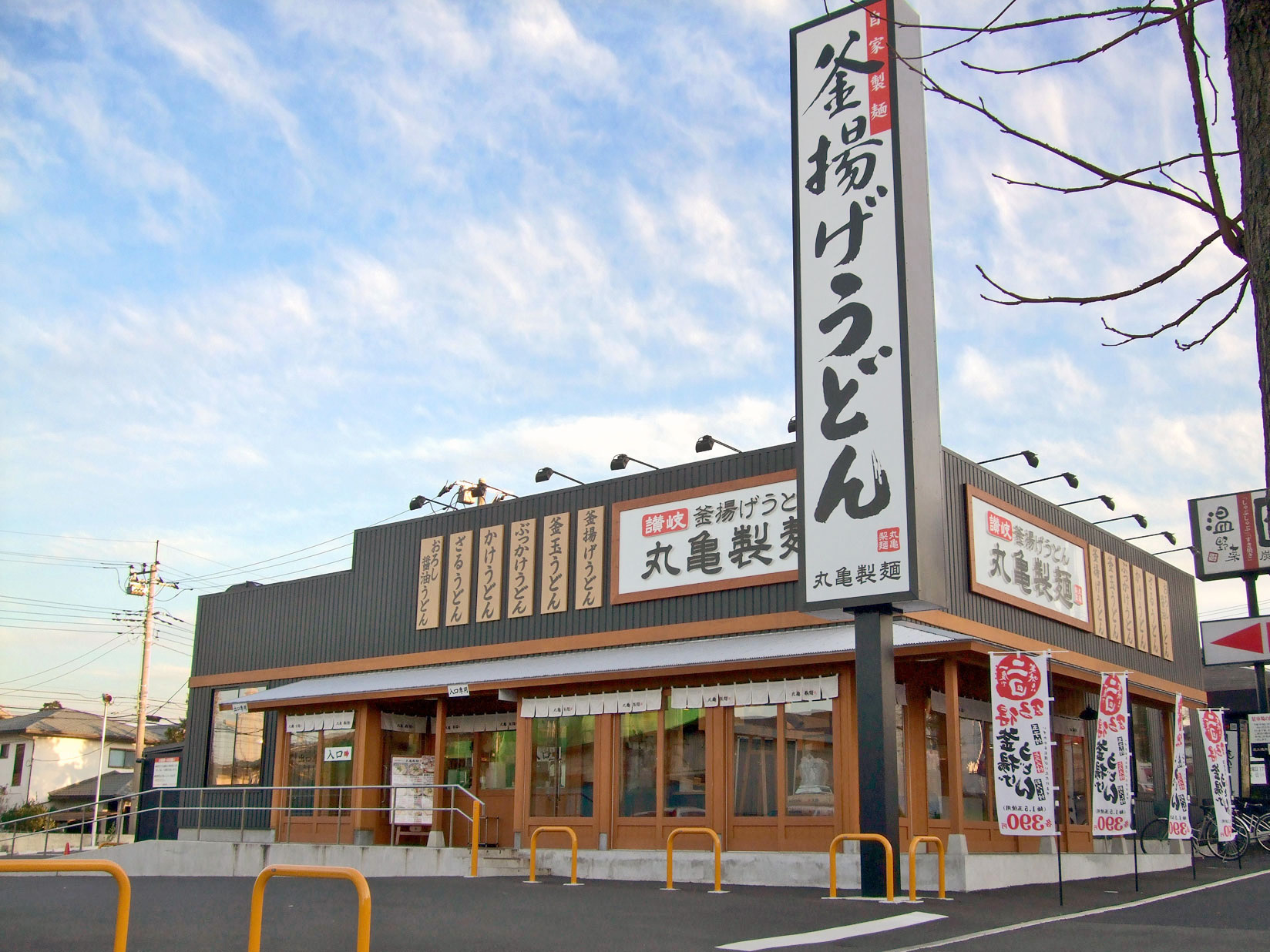
- A Marugame Seimen branch in Matsudo, Chiba, Japan
- Industry: Foodservice
- Headquarters: Kobe, Hyōgo, Japan
- Number of locations: 1,006
- Area served: Australia (formerly); East Asia; Southeast Asia; United Kingdom; United States; Canada
- Revenue: ▼¥89.9 billion (2019)
- Net income: ▼¥12.4 billion (2019)
- Parent: Toridoll Holdings Corporation
- Website: jp.marugame.com

Toridoll Holdings Corporation
- Traded as: TYO: 3397
- Website: toridoll.com

Marugame Seimen (丸亀製麺), also known as Marugame Udon outside of Japan, is a Japanese fast-casual restaurant chain specializing in udon. The chain is operated by Toridoll Holdings Corporation based in Kobe.

In April 2023 Toridoll agreed to buy Franco Manca and The Real Greek from Fulham Shore for £93.4m.

== Description ==
Marugame Seimen is one of the largest business formats owned by Toridoll Holdings Corporation since the 2000s. The udon chain has become the first to have a location across all 47 prefectures across Japan in 2011. The chain's first store is located in Kakogawa, Hyōgo, and opened in 2000.

=== Changes in foreign locations ===
The name of the restaurant is changed to "Marukame" in some foreign locations to prevent diners from mispronouncing the letters "game" in the chain's original name "Marugame" as the single-syllable word "game".

The dish name "Bukkake udon" is changed to "BK udon", as the term "Bukkake" in English describes a sexual act.

=== Controversy over the brand name ===
Despite its name, the chain does not have a location in Marugame, Kagawa, and it has only a single location in Kagawa Prefecture, famous for its local specialty of Sanuki udon. As a result, the chain's name has been criticized by locals in Kagawa.

=== Menu ===
The menu mostly consists of Sanuki udon, with noodles made in each location, along with tempura vegetables, meat, and other toppings. There are also side dishes available, such as rice balls.

== Operation ==
As of June 2024, the chain has 786 locations across Japan. The chain also has 271 operations outside Japan, including in the United States, the United Kingdom, the Philippines, Cambodia, Canada, Vietnam, Taiwan, Indonesia, China, and Hong Kong.

Marugame Seimen closed all stores in South Korea in 2021 due to COVID-19 pandemic.

Marugame Udon opened a single store in Singapore at Ion Orchard in 2018 before closing in 2023.

On 31 March 2022, Marugame Seimen closed all three stores in Thailand. They also closed all stores located in Russia following the Russian invasion of Ukraine. However, for some time the Russian locations continued operations as "Maru" under the local management before it was completely rebranded as "Udon Noodle Bar".

Marugame Seimen opened its first Canadian store in Vancouver on 24 February 2024.

On 27 May 2025, the restaurant chain opened its first store in Brunei, located at The Mall in Gadong.
