= Nick Barker =

Nick Barker may refer to:

- Nick Barker (drummer) (born 1973), British heavy metal drummer
- Nick Barker (Australian musician), rock singer-songwriter and guitarist
- Nick Barker (priest) (born 1949), British Anglican priest
- Nick Barker (Royal Navy officer) (1933–1997), British naval officer

== See also ==
- Nick Baker (disambiguation)
