= Rhys McWilliams =

English ice hockey player (born 1985)

- Born: 29 November 1985 (age 39); Birmingham, England, United Kingdom
- Height: 5 ft 10 in (178 cm)
- Weight: 175 lb (79 kg; 12 st 7 lb)
- Position: Forward
- Shoots: Right
- ENIHL team Former teams: Coventry Blaze (ENL); Coventry Blaze; Manchester Phoenix
- Playing career: 2000–present

Rhys McWilliams (born 29 November 1985, Birmingham, England) is an English professional ice hockey player, currently playing with the Coventry Blaze organisation at ENIHL level. In the year 2000 he began his professional career, making his debut for the Solihull Barons as a young forward having also featured for their U-19 team, the Solihull Knights. Whilst playing for the Knights, McWilliams managed the astounding total of 55 points in just 17 games. He went on to become much more of a regular for the Barons in the following season and showed enough promise to play for the England U-18 team. McWilliams remained in Solihull through the name and league changes, icing 32 times for the Solihull MK Kings.

During the 2002/03 season, McWilliams also played for another local team, the Birmingham Rockets for just six games, but totalled seven points in this brief spell. McWilliams also made two more appearances for the England U-18 squad.

The 2003/04 season proved to be a season of change for McWilliams. He began the year playing for the Peterborough Phantoms, but after 27 games was spotted by the EIHL club, the Nottingham Panthers. This was a big step up for McWilliams, and he played only twice during the rest of the season. The 2004/05 season was again split between the Solihull Kings in the EPL and the Panthers. During his second spell in Nottingham, McWilliams played in 14 games and managed to grab his first EIHL goal.

McWilliams would continue to split seasons between teams in the EPL and the EIHL – whilst mainly icing for the Solihull Barons, he would also spend time again in Nottingham during 2005/06 and playing for the league-winning Coventry Blaze in 2006/07.

Seeking consistency, McWilliams moved away from the Midlands area and moved further north to sign for the Manchester Phoenix, yet another EIHL team. Whilst at the Phoenix, McWilliams was re-united with his former Barons team-mate, Nick Whyatt. In his time at the Altrincham Ice Dome, McWilliams was mainly used as an energy player on the third line. Despite playing in over 40 games for the Phoenix, McWilliams was released from his Manchester contract by head coach Tony Hand in February 2008.

After being released, McWilliams would return to Coventry, and in the summer of 2008 would once again play for the Coventry Blaze organisation, although this time at ENIHL level.
