= Taylor McWilliams =

American real estate developer

- Born: 1980 or 1981 (age 44–45)
- Occupation: property developer

Taylor McWilliams (born October 1980) is an American real estate developer and part-time DJ, who owns most of London's Brixton Market.

McWilliams is originally from Texas, and by 2014, was based in Earls Court/Fulham, London.

In 2018, McWilliams acquired Brixton market against competition from Mike Ashley and Aidan Brooks.

McWilliams is a part-time DJ, part of the Housekeeping quartet along with Carl Waxberg, Sebastian Macdonald-Hall and Jacobi Anstruther-Gough-Calthorpe.

In July 2020, McWilliams's company, Hondo Enterprises evicted Nour Cash & Carry from Brixton Market after more than 20 years there, leading to local protests and the founding of the Save Nour group. On 3 November 2020, Hondo Enterprises won planning permission for the development of a 20-storey office block in Brixton, next to a conservation area and Electric Avenue.
