= Michael J. Nemes =

American politician

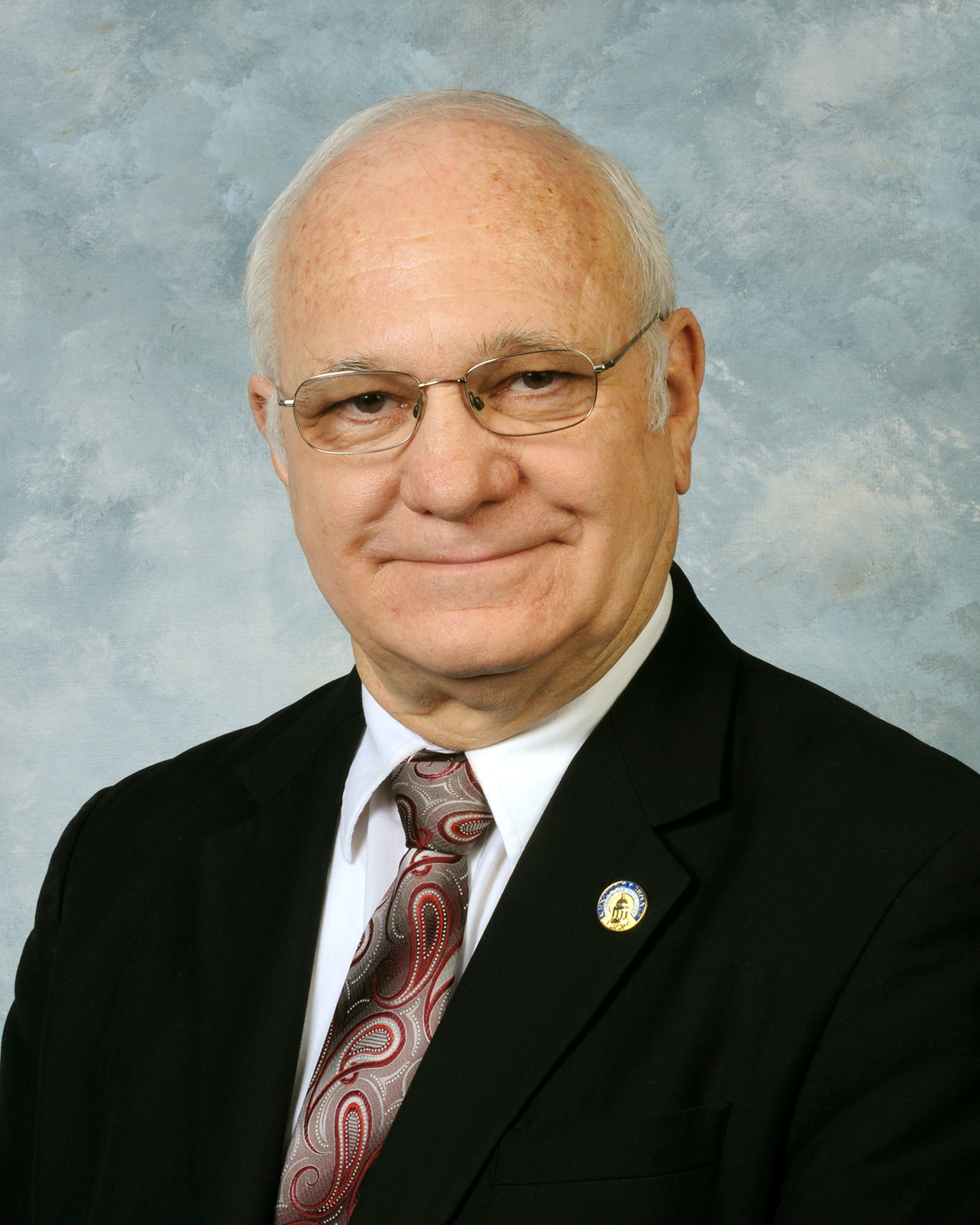
- Official portrait, 2020

Member of the Kentucky Senate from the 38th district
- Incumbent
- Assumed office January 21, 2020
- Preceded by: Dan Seum

Member of the Kentucky House of Representatives from the 38th district
- In office January 1, 2011 – January 1, 2013
- Preceded by: Tim Firkins
- Succeeded by: Denver Butler

Personal details
- Born: February 20, 1954 (age 72) Kentucky, U.S.
- Party: Republican
- Children: Jason Nemes

Michael Joseph Nemes (born February 20, 1954) is an American politician who serves in the Kentucky State Senate representing the 38th Senate district since January 21, 2020. He previously served in the Kentucky House of Representatives representing the 38th House district from January 2011 to January 2013. He was defeated for reelection in 2012 by then-Democrat Denver Butler.
