= Nicolás Martínez (footballer, born 1986) =

Argentine footballer

Personal information
- Full name: Darío Nicolás Martínez
- Date of birth: 25 January 1986 (age 40)
- Place of birth: Buenos Aires, Argentina
- Height: 1.75 m (5 ft 9 in)
- Position: Defender

Team information
- Current team: Los Cuervos del Fin del Mundo

Youth career
- Los Andes

Senior career*
Years	Team	Apps	(Gls)
2007–2010	Los Andes	38	(2)
2016	Racing de Trelew	3	(0)
2017–	Los Cuervos del Fin del Mundo	9	(0)
- * Club domestic league appearances and goals as of 21:37, 18 December 2018 (UTC)

Darío Nicolás Martínez (born 25 January 1986) is an Argentine professional footballer who plays as a defender for Los Cuervos del Fin del Mundo.

== Career ==
Martínez's senior career began with Los Andes. He made thirty-eight appearances for them in three years across seasons in Primera B Nacional and Primera B Metropolitana, netting two goals in the process; with his final goal for the club coming in the third tier on 10 April 2010 against Villa San Carlos. In 2016, Martínez featured for Racing de Trelew in Torneo Federal B. A division he remained in for the following year, joining Los Cuervos del Fin del Mundo from the 2017 campaign. A total of twelve appearances arrived across both stints.

== Career statistics ==
As of 18 December 2018.

Club statistics
Club	Season	League			Cup (Note: Includes the Copa Argentina)		League Cup		Continental		Other		Total	
Club	Season	Division	Apps	Goals	Apps	Goals	Apps	Goals	Apps	Goals	Apps	Goals	Apps	Goals
Los Andes	2008–09	Primera B Nacional	2	0	0	0	—		—		0	0	2	0
Career total			2	0	0	0	—		—		0	0	2	0
