= Nick George =

Nick George may refer to:

- Nick George (basketball) (born 1982), British basketball player
- Nick George, author of comic book stories and animation scripts; see Working for Peanuts
- Nick George (fictional character), a character in the American television series Dirty Sexy Money
