= Nick Russell =

Nick or Nicholas Russell may refer to:

- Nick Russell (basketball) (born 1991), American basketball player
- Nicholas Russell, 6th Earl Russell (1968–2014)
- Nick Russell (actor), Australian television actor, producer and director
- Nicky Russell, lead singer for L.I.G.A.
- Nick Russell (Power Rangers)

== See also ==
- Nicholas Russel or Nikolai Sudzilovsky (1850–1930), revolutionary and scientist
