= Nicolás Martínez (footballer, born 1997) =

Uruguayan footballer

Personal information
- Full name: Nicolás Alejandro Martínez Collazo
- Date of birth: 5 December 1997 (age 28)
- Place of birth: Montevideo, Uruguay
- Height: 1.74 m (5 ft 8 1/2 in)
- Position: Defender

Senior career*
Years	Team	Apps	(Gls)
2017–2019	Sud América	14	(0)
- * Club domestic league appearances and goals as of 00:50, 19 December 2018 (UTC)

Nicolás Alejandro Martínez Collazo (born 5 December 1997) is a Uruguayan professional footballer who plays as a defender.

== Career ==
Martínez's career got underway with Sud América. After being an unused substitute for a Uruguayan Primera División fixture with Fénix on 4 February 2017, the defender made his pro debut a week later against Rampla Juniors. He was selected in four more matches by the club as they were relegated to the Segunda División. He featured nine times in 2018, two of which ended prematurely due to Martínez receiving a red card. He left the club by the end of the year.

In March 2019 it was confirmed, that Martínez was on a trial at the Swedish club IFK Göteborg. However, the club decided not to offer him a contract.

== Career statistics ==
As of 19 December 2018.

Club statistics
Club	Season	League			Cup		League Cup		Continental		Other		Total	
Club	Season	Division	Apps	Goals	Apps	Goals	Apps	Goals	Apps	Goals	Apps	Goals	Apps	Goals
Sud América	2017	Primera División	5	0	—		—		—		0	0	5	0
Sud América	2018	Segunda División	9	0	—		—		—		0	0	9	0
Career total			14	0	—		—		—		0	0	14	0
