= Nick Turvey =

South African pilot (1931–2006)

Roland Archer Nicholas Turvey
- Born: 16 November 1931; South Africa
- Died: 26 March 2006 (aged 74)
- Military career
- Allegiance: South Africa
- Branch: South African Air Force
- Nickname: Nick
- Other work: Air show pilot and aerobatic champion. Founder of Avex Air company

Roland Archer Nicholas Turvey (16 November 1931 – 26 March 2006) was a champion aerobatic and air show pilot in South Africa.

== Career ==
Nick Turvey earned his flying wings in the South African Air Force in 1955. He later became Chief Instructor of the Johannesburg Light Plane Club, a popular flying club of that era. He was awarded Springbok Colours for aerobatics in 1965 and represented South Africa at the World Aerobatic Championships four times. In 1981, Turvey survived a crash in his red Pitts Special, ZS-ZAP at the Aviation Africa airshow, using his skills to avoid crashing into cars and spectators. He won the National Aerobatic Championships eight times.

Turvey was also a committee member of the South African Air Force Association (SAAFA) from 1963 until shortly before his death.

== See also ==
- Aerobatics
- List of South Africans
