= Nick Rogers =

Nick or Nicholas Rogers may refer to:

- Nick Rogers (American football) (1979–2010), Arena Football League linebacker
- Nick Rogers (sailor) (born 1977), British sailor
- Nicholas Rogers (runner), American athlete
- Nicholas Rogers (politician), British politician
- Nicholas Rogers (actor), Australian model and actor
