= Tim Firkins =

American politician

Member of the Kentucky House of Representatives from the 38th district
- In office January 1, 2007 – January 1, 2011
- Preceded by: Denver Butler Sr.
- Succeeded by: Michael J. Nemes

Personal details
- Born: January 19, 1948 (age 78) Louisville, Kentucky
- Party: Democratic
- Spouse: Jackie
- Children: Chad (stepson)
- Education: University of Louisville; Western Kentucky University

Timothy Firkins (born January 18, 1948) is an American politician who served as the representative for the 38th district in the Kentucky House of Representatives from January 2007 to January 2011. Firkins was elected in November 2006 and ran unopposed in November 2008. He lost re-election in the Republican wave election of 2010 to Republican Michael J. Nemes.
