= Nick Robertson =

Nick, Nic or Nicholas Robertson may refer to:

- Nic Robertson (born 1962), CNN war reporter
- Nick Robertson (footballer) (born 1995), Australian rules footballer
- Nick Robertson (businessman) (born 1967), British businessman, co-founder of ASOS.com
- Nick Robertson (baseball) (born 1998), baseball player
- Nick Robertson (ice hockey) (born 2001), American ice hockey player
