= Brixton Market =

Street market in south London

Coordinates: 51.462°N 0.114°W

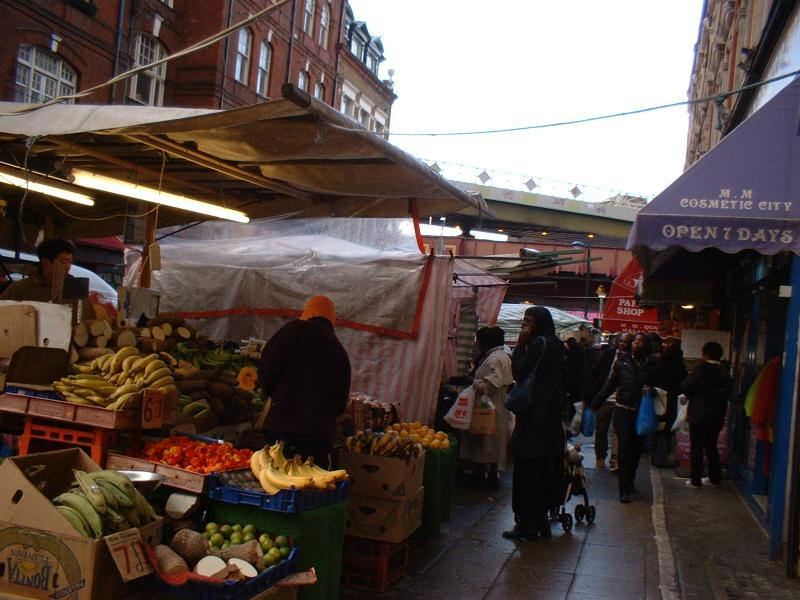
Brixton Market

Brixton Market comprises a street market in the centre of Brixton, south London, and the adjacent covered market areas in nearby arcades Reliance Arcade, Market Row and Granville Arcade (rebranded as 'Brixton Village' in 2009).

The market sells a wide range of foods and goods but is best known for its African and Caribbean produce, which reflect the diverse community of Brixton and surrounding areas of Lambeth. The Street Market is managed by the London Borough of Lambeth. The covered arcades have always been in private ownership, although substantial public funding was provided for their refurbishment under the Brixton Challenge grant scheme.

The market was severely damaged by fire on 16 July 2022.

== History ==
The Market began on Atlantic Road in the 1870s and subsequently spread to Brixton Road which had a very wide footway. Brixton then was a rapidly expanding London railway suburb with newly opening shops, including the first London branch of David Greig at 54-58 Atlantic Road in 1870, and London's first purpose-built department store, Bon Marché, on Brixton Road in 1877. The market was a popular attraction, with shoppers being entertained by street musicians.

Electric Avenue which is now part of the street market was built in the 1880s and was one of the first streets to have electric light. Glazed iron canopies covered the footpath, but these were significantly damaged by WW2 bombs, and finally removed in the 1980s. The song "Electric Avenue" was written by Eddy Grant referring to this area of the market. In 2016, Electric Avenue was refurbished with funding from the Mayor of London's High Street Fund, Lambeth Council, Transport for London and the Heritage Lottery fund to include an illuminated sign celebrating the area's history.

== The covered market arcades ==
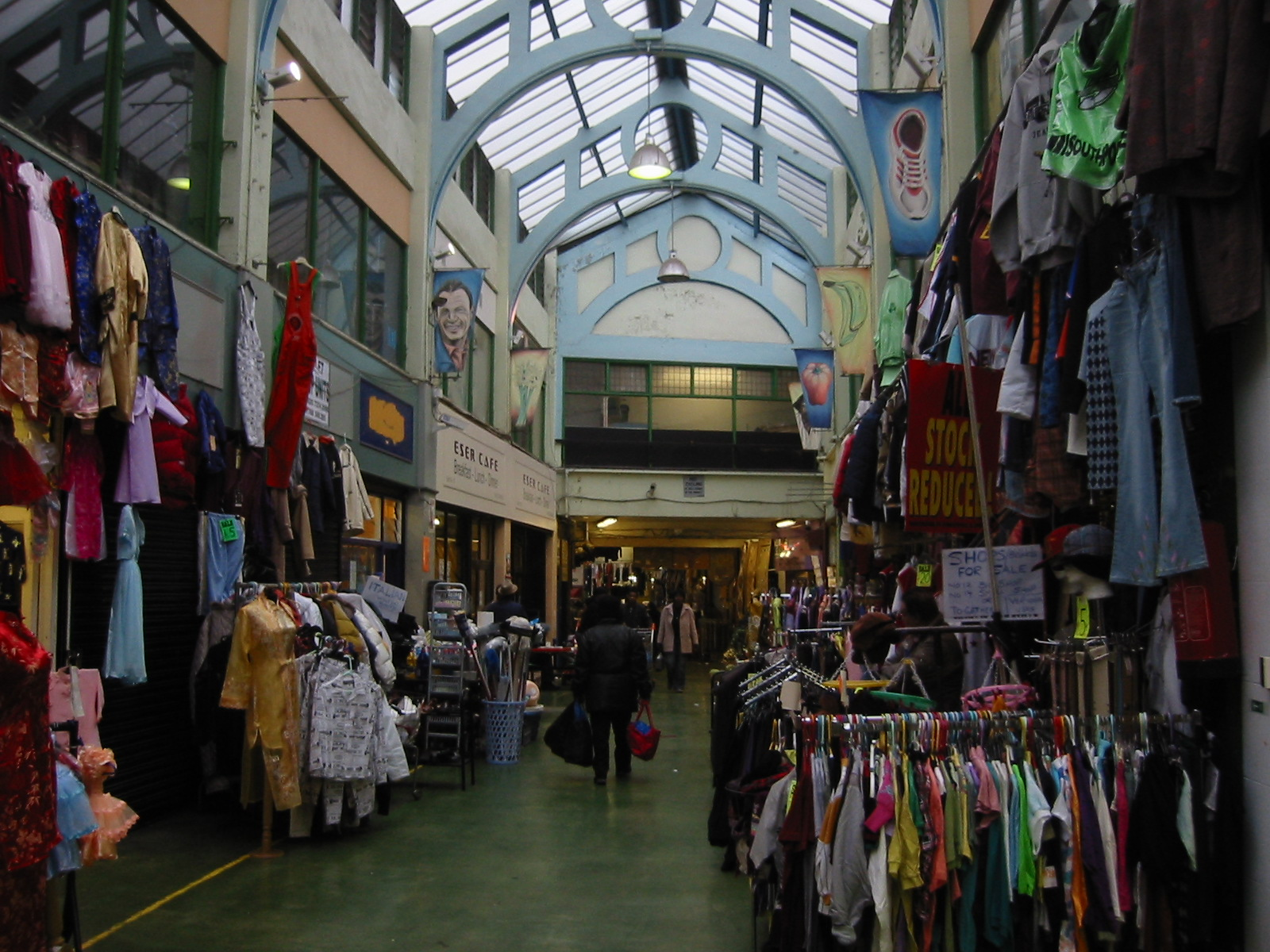
Arcade

The market arcades were built in the 1920s and 1930s when road widening on Brixton Road forced traders from their established pitches.

Reliance Arcade, 455 Brixton Road (c1924) provides a narrow pedestrian route from Brixton Road to Electric Lane. It incorporates the original Georgian house and has a beautiful Egyptian tomb facade to Electric Lane; it was extended forward by Ernest J Thomas in 1931. Inside there are small shops no larger than market stalls and a glazed roof provide the light.

Reliance Arcade is Grade II listed, and was added to English Heritage's Heritage At Risk Register in October 2014.

Market Row, 40–44 Atlantic Road was designed by Andrews and Peascod in 1928. It was built in the back yards of existing premises and links Atlantic Road, Coldharbour Lane and Electric Lane. The interior is double-height and windows in the roof provide light.

Brixton Village, Coldharbour Lane was built as Granville Arcade in 1937 to designs of Alfred and Vincent Burr; the developer was Philip Granville-Grossman. It was opened by actor Carl Brisson on 6 May 1937. It has an interior of narrow covered streets called 'Avenues', and is double-height, similar to Market Row. There are over 100 shops. It links Coldharbour Lane, Atlantic Road and Popes Road.

The three market arcades in close proximity, forming an extensive network of stalls, are rare survivals and their special character is what marks out Brixton as distinctive from other suburban shopping centres: a mixture of history, interesting architecture, the variety of goods on sale and the cultural mix of Brixton, known as the symbolic 'soul of black Britain'.

Since 2011, the shops in Brixton Village and, more recently, Market Row and Reliance Arcade have been increasingly converted into cafes and restaurants, serving a wide range of different cuisines. As a result, they are now open 8:00 am – 11.30 pm every day except Monday, when they shut at 6:00 pm.

=== Proposed redevelopment of covered market arcades (2008–2009) ===
In 2007, Market Row and Brixton Village were sold along with the other London market interests of APL Ocean Ltd to London & Associated Properties. In 2008, the new owners released proposals to redevelop the Brixton Village covered market.

The proposal included the removal of the existing building and the building of a 10-storey privately owned residential tower block and private park, above a new market building.

In January 2009, London and Associated Properties employed communications company Four Communications to undertake a survey of local opinion. Concerns were raised on the Brixton Community website Urban 75 that the survey was one sided, only available in English.

Friends of Brixton Market, traders and residents ran a successful campaign against the proposals.

Paul Bakalite's proposal for Listing was strongly supported by the Twentieth Century Society. In April 2010 the Secretary of State of the Department of Culture (DCMS) announced that the government had overturned its previous decision not award heritage protection to these three arcades and declared all three Grade II listed buildings. They were listed by virtue of their cultural importance and contribution to the social and economic history of Brixton, particularly since the 1950s as one of the principal hearts of the Afro-Caribbean community in London, as well as for their architectural importance since such arcades, once more common, are now rare.

=== Controversial redevelopment plans for Brixton Arches (2016–2017) ===
In 2015, Network Rail contacted the merchants trading from the commercial premises located under the railway arches on Atlantic Road indicating plans to close those premises for a year for refurbishment as part of the Brixton Central masterplan for redevelopment of the area. This led to a public outcry from traders, many of whom had been occupying their retail space for decades, claiming that this closure was an excuse to increase rents as they would be able to return to occupy the same space, but with a 350% increase of their rents.

The traders and community launched the Save Brixton Arches campaign, which fed into the anti-gentrification movement already underway within the Brixton community and culminated in a protest at the local council meeting where community activists declared the "death of Brixton" after the plans were approved. In 2017, the majority of the arches traders ceased trading and hoardings were installed over the empty premises, but development has stalled due to complications involving the leases of two of the tenants.

During the same decade a series of properties comprising most of Brixton Market were purchased by Hondo a company controlled by Taylor McWilliams an American investor. McWilliams has since proposed building an office tower twenty stories tall on Electric Avenue.

=== Individuals ===
- David Copeland
- Eddy Grant
- Sir John Major
- Taylor McWilliams

=== Market Roads in Brixton ===
- Pope's Road
- Electric Avenue
- Brixton Station Road

== See also ==
- New Covent Garden Market
- Brixton railway station
