= Nick Evans =

Nick or Nicholas Evans may refer to:

== Arts and entertainment ==
- Nicholas Evans (artist) (1907–2004), Welsh artist
- Nicholas Evans (actor) (1932–2026), English actor who appeared in the Doctor Who story "The Dalek Invasion of Earth"
- Nick Evans (trombonist) (born 1947), British jazz trombonist with the Keith Tippett Group, Soft Machine and others
- Nicholas Evans (1950–2022), English screenwriter and journalist

== Sports ==
- Nick Evans (baseball) (born 1986), American baseball player
- Nick Evans (cricketer) (born 1954), English cricketer
- Nick Evans (rugby union) (born 1980), New Zealand rugby union footballer

== Others ==
- Nicholas Evans (linguist) (born 1956), Australian linguist specializing in Indigenous Australian languages

== See also ==
- Nicky Evans (disambiguation)
