= Nick Roberts =

Nick Roberts may refer to:

- Nick Roberts (weightlifter) (born 1984), Canadian weightlifter
- Nick Roberts (politician) (born 2000), American politician in Indianapolis

== See also ==
- Nicky Roberts (born 1990), Irish hurler
