= Nick West =

Nicholas or Nick West may refer to:

== Fictional characters ==
- Nick West, character in Doctors (2000 TV series)
- Nick West, character in 35 and Ticking

== Others ==
- Nicholas West (1461–1533), English bishop and diplomatist
- Nick West (soccer) (born 1997), American association football midfielder
- Kin Platt (1911–2003), American writer and artist who used Nick West as one of his pseudonyms
- Nick West (author) of The American series of The Three Investigators
- Nick West (rally driver), see List of World Rally Championship drivers
