= Nick Reding =

Nick Reding may refer to:

- Nick Reding (actor) (born 1962), British actor
- Nick Reding (journalist), American journalist
