= Nick Bell =

Nick Bell may refer to:

- Nick Bell (Australian entrepreneur), (born 1980), founder of WME, Australian digital agency
- Nick Bell (businessman) (born 1983), British entrepreneur
- Nick Bell (American football) (born 1968), former American football running back
- Nick Bell (fencer) (born 1950), British fencer

== See also ==
- Nicholas Bell (born 1958), English actor working in Australia
