= Nick Stevens (disambiguation) =

Nick Stevens is an Australian rules footballer.

Nick Stevens may also refer to:

- Nick Stevens (American football), American football player
- Nick Stevens (cricketer), cricketer
