= Nicholas Robinson (physician) =

Welsh physician

Nicholas Robin
- Born: 1697?
- Died: 13 May 1775
- Occupation: Physician

Nicholas Robin (1697? – 13 May 1775) was a Welsh physician.

== Biography ==
Robin was a native of Wales. He was born about 1697, graduated M.D. at Rheims on 15 Dec. 1718, and, like Richard Mead, who was his first patron, began practice without the necessary license of the College of Physicians, residing in Wood Street in the city of London. In 1721 he published ‘A Compleat Treatise of the Gravel and Stone,’ in which he condemns the guarded opinion which Charles Bernard had given on the subject of cutting into the kidney to remove renal calculus, and declares himself strongly in favour of the operation. He describes a tinctura lithontriptica, pulvis lithontripticus, and elixir lithontripticum devised by him as sovereign remedies for the stone and the gravel. In 1725 he published ‘A New Theory of Physick and Diseases founded on the Newtonian Philosophy.’ The theory is indefinite, and seems little more than that there is no infallible authority in medicine. In 1727 he published ‘A New Method of treating Consumptions,’ and on 27 March was admitted a licentiate of the College of Physicians. He moved to Warwick Court in Warwick Lane, and in 1729 published ‘A New System of the Spleen, Vapours, and Hypochondriack Melancholy,’ dedicated to Sir Hans Sloane. He mentions in it, from the report of eye-witnesses, the last symptoms of Marlborough's illness, which are generally known from Johnson's poetical allusion to them, and relates as example of the occasional danger of the disease then known as vapours that a Mrs. Davis died of joy because her son returned safely from India; while a Mrs. Chiswell died of sorrow because her son went to Turkey. In 1729 he published a ‘Discourse on the Nature and Cause of Sudden Deaths,’ in which he maintains that some cases of apoplexy ought not to be treated by bleeding, and describes from his own observation the cerebral appearances in opium poisoning. His ‘Treatise of the Venereal Disease,’ which appeared in 1736, and ‘Essay on Gout,’ published in 1755, are without any original observations. He used to give lectures on medicine at his house, and published a syllabus. He also wrote ‘The Christian Philosopher’ in 1741, and ‘A Treatise on the Virtues of a Crust of Bread’ in 1756. All his writings are diffuse, and contain scarcely an observation of permanent value. He died on 13 May 1775.
