= Nick Galifianakis =

Nick Galifianakis may refer to:

- Nick Galifianakis (politician) (1928–2023), American congressman
- Nick Galifianakis (cartoonist), American cartoonist and artist, nephew of the politician
