= Nick Ross (disambiguation) =

Nick Ross (born 1947) is a British radio and television presenter.

Nick or Nicholas Ross may also refer to:

- Nick Ross (footballer, born 1862) (1862–1894), Scottish footballer, played for Hearts, Preston NE and Everton
- Nick Ross (footballer, born 1991), Scottish footballer
- Nick Ross (ice hockey) (born 1989), Canadian ice hockey player, currently plays for San Antonio Rampage in the AHL
- Nick Ross (field hockey) (born 1990), New Zealand field hockey player
- Nicholas Ross (cricketer) (born 1947), Scottish cricketer
- Nicholas Ross (died 1967), American bookseller and husband of Adelaide Phillpotts
- Nick Ross (high jumper), winner of the 2012 NCAA DI indoor high jump championship
