= Nicolás Martínez (footballer, born 1992) =

Argentine footballer

Personal information
- Full name: Rodrigo Nicolás Martínez
- Date of birth: 14 July 1992 (age 34)
- Place of birth: San Salvador de Jujuy, Argentina
- Height: 1.78 m (5 ft 10 in)
- Position: Forward

Team information
- Current team: Deportivo Pampa Blanca

Senior career*
| Years | Team | Apps | (Gls) |
| 2012–2013 | Gimnasia y Esgrima | 3 | (0) |
| 2012–2013 | → Altos Hornos Zapla (loan) | 18 | (1) |
| 2013–2014 | Talleres | | |
| 2014 | Atlético Chicoana | 1 | (0) |
| 2015 | Talleres | 0 | (0) |
| 2016 | Progreso | 10 | (0) |
| 2016 | Talleres | | |
| 2017 | Deportivo Tabacal | 16 | (1) |
| 2018– | Deportivo Pampa Blanca | | |
- * Club domestic league appearances and goals

Rodrigo Nicolás Martínez (born 14 July 1992) is an Argentine footballer who plays as a forward for Deportivo Pampa Blanca.

== Career ==
Martínez began his career in Primera B Nacional with Gimnasia y Esgrima. A goalless draw at home to Patronato on 18 March 2012 saw Martínez make his professional debut, coming on after seventy-five minutes for Marcos Pirchio. Two further appearances followed for the club. In June 2012, Martínez was loaned to Altos Hornos Zapla of Torneo Argentino B. He was selected eighteen times in 2012–13, with the forward scoring once. Martínez left Gimnasia y Esgrima permanently in 2013, signing for fourth tier Talleres. Moves to Atlético Chicoana and Progreso followed, either side of a stint back with Talleres.

He rejoined Talleres for a third time in late-2016, prior to appearing in Torneo Federal B for Deportivo Tabacal in 2017. One goal in sixteen appearances occurred as they finished sixth in Zona A Norte. Ahead of 2018, Martínez agreed to join Torneo Federal C's Deportivo Pampa Blanca.

== Career statistics ==
As of 19 December 2018.

Club statistics
| Club | Season | League | | | Cup (Note: Includes the Copa Argentina) | | League Cup | | Continental | | Other | | Total | |
| Club | Season | Division | Apps | Goals | Apps | Goals | Apps | Goals | Apps | Goals | Apps | Goals | Apps | Goals |
|---|---|---|---|---|---|---|---|---|---|---|---|---|---|---|
| Gimnasia y Esgrima | 2011–12 | Primera B Nacional | 3 | 0 | 0 | 0 | — | | — | | 0 | 0 | 3 | 0 |
| Gimnasia y Esgrima | 2012–13 | Primera B Nacional | 0 | 0 | 0 | 0 | — | | — | | 0 | 0 | 0 | 0 |
| Gimnasia y Esgrima | Total | | 3 | 0 | 0 | 0 | — | | — | | 0 | 0 | 3 | 0 |
| Altos Hornos Zapla (loan) | 2012–13 | Torneo Argentino B | 18 | 1 | 0 | 0 | — | | — | | 0 | 0 | 18 | 1 |
| Atlético Chicoana | 2014 | Torneo Federal B | 1 | 0 | 0 | 0 | — | | — | | 0 | 0 | 1 | 0 |
| Deportivo Tabacal | 2017 | Torneo Federal B | 16 | 1 | 0 | 0 | — | | — | | 0 | 0 | 16 | 1 |
| Career total | | | 38 | 2 | 0 | 0 | — | | — | | 0 | 0 | 38 | 2 |
