= Nick Rivera =

Nick Rivera may refer to:

- Nick Rivera, darts competitor in the 2008 Las Vegas Desert Classic
- Nick Rivera, composer for the music of CrossBones etc.
- Nick Rivera, a character on Manimal
- Dr. Nick Riviera, a character on the show The Simpsons

== See also ==
- Nicky Jam or Nick Rivera Caminero (born 1980), Puerto Rican singer
