= Nick Tanner (disambiguation) =

Nick Tanner is a British footballer.

Nick or Nicholas Tanner may also refer to:

- Nick Tanner (actor), a member of the comedy group The Hollow Men
- Nicholas Tanner, MP
