= Nick Rose =

Nick Rose may refer to:

- Nick Rose (American football) (born 1994), American football placekicker
- Nick Rose (lacrosse) (born 1988), Canadian lacrosse goaltender
- Nick Rose (runner) (born 1951), British track and field athlete

== See also ==
- Nick Ross, British radio and television presenter
