= Nick Wechsler =

Nick Wechsler may also refer to:

- Nick Wechsler (actor) (born 1978), American actor
- Nick Wechsler (film producer) (born 1949), American film producer
