= Nick Tatham =

British singer-songwriter (born 1983)

- Born: 11 June 1983 (age 43)
- Origin: Hong Kong
- Occupation: Singer-songwriter

Nick Tatham (born 11 June 1983, Hong Kong) is a British singer-songwriter who has dealt with Tourette syndrome for most of his life whilst writing and recording ballads, pop songs and other assorted modern music.

Tatham has appeared in several BBC television documentaries and received the "Meridian Tonight Young Hero Award", live on TV in 2002, for his contributions to local music and his constant optimism and strength in dealing with his condition. In 2004 Tatham took the lead role in school student Richard Booth's Live for the Moment, a film drama which chronicled the life of a person with Tourette's syndrome.

On 20 April 2012 Tatham appeared in the blind auditions of the BBC talent series, The Voice, but failed to persuade any of the judging panel to choose him.

== Discography ==
- Nick Tatham Carousel (2005 & 2006)
- Love is All Around (2002)
- Tourette Blues (2000)

== Music videos ==
- Different (single) (2006), directed by Richard Booth
