= Nick Charles (author) =

Author and alcohol consultant

Nick Charles MBE
- Born: 15 December 1944 (age 80)
- Occupations: Author; Alcohol Consultant
- Years active: 1976–present
- Website: nickcharles.co.uk

Nick Charles MBE (born 1944), is the first person to be honoured by the Queen for 'Services to people with alcohol problems'. He is the author of several books, including his autobiography Through A Glass Brightly, published by Robson Books, and founder of the Chaucer Clinic, the UK's largest alcohol project until it closed in 2005. He was director of the Gainsborough Foundation, which provides treatment for alcoholism through GP surgeries across Cambridgeshire from 2008 to 2017.

== Chaucer Clinic ==
Charles founded the Chaucer Clinic in 1989. Located in Southall, the clinic grew into the largest in the UK, with most "members" (as they were referred to in the clinic) staying between six and twelve months. In 1998, Charles claimed the clinic had helped thousands of people. For this work, Charles was awarded an MBE for 'Services to people with alcohol problems'. The clinic faced several financial problems following funding cuts in 2001, but stayed open due to private donations, including several from celebrities and musicians following an appeal by Who guitarist Pete Townshend, which helped raise £60,000. The clinic was eventually closed in 2005.

== Gainsborough Foundation ==
Charles and his team relocated to continue their work in the hope of finding new facilities after the Chaucer Clinic closed in 2005. After meeting with GP's in Ramsey, Cambridgeshire, Charles established the Gainsborough Foundation, which offers Charles' unique treatment methods through over 60 GP surgeries across the county. According to statistics kept by the foundation, 78 per cent of patients who complete this treatment are still alcohol-free after two years. The Foundation's Programme has also won a number of national awards, including the "improving patient services" award with Ramsey's Rainbow Surgery at the National Association of Primary Care conference in 2010. Nick is currently evaluating the impact alcohol abuse has on mental health per se, together with other trusted professionals in the field.

== Personal life ==
Charles is married to former child star and actress Lesley Roach, with whom he lives in Cambridgeshire.

== Bibliography ==
- Through A Glass Brightly (Autobiography).
- The Honest Truth: Using the ACR to explore Alcohol Dependency. June 2021. ISBN 978-1911121947.
- A Doctor's Tonic. 2021.
- 50 Years of Hard Road. October 2021.
- Life in the Devil’s Cellar - Biography of Nikki de Villiers. 2022.
- Miss Reeves - A Biographical, Alcohol Educational and Awareness Adventure story for young people.
- ANSWERS (Alcoholics Needing a Swift Widespread Educational Recovery Solution). "Treatment manual for professional use only"
