= Nick Jennings =

Nick Jennings may refer to:

- Nick Jennings (computer scientist) (born 1966), British computer scientist
- Nick Jennings (artist), American animation director
