= Nick Hardwick =

Nick Hardwick may refer to:

- Nick Hardwick (American football), American football player
- Nick Hardwick (executive), former Chief Inspector of Prisons in the United Kingdom
