= Nick Patrick =

Nick Patrick may refer to:

- Nick Patrick (actor), British actor
- Nicholas Patrick, British-born NASA astronaut
- Nick Patrick (referee), wrestling referee
- Nick Patrick (record producer), British record producer
