= Nick Walker =

Nick or Nicholas Walker may refer to:

- Nick Walker (artist) (born 1969), British graffiti artist
- Nick Walker (bodybuilder) (born 1994), American bodybuilder
- Nick Walker (cricketer) (born 1984), British cricketer
- Nick Walker (footballer) (born 1990), Trinidadian footballer
- Nick Walker (scholar), scholar associated with neurodiversity
- Nick Walker (snooker player) (born 1973), English former snooker player
- Nico Walker, birth name Nicholas Walker (born 1985), American writer and bank robber
- Nicholas Walker, actor known for his roles on the American soap operas Capitol and One Life to Live
