= Nicholas John Baker =

British chef and criminal

Nick Baker
- Born: Gloucestershire, England
- Occupation: chef
- Parent: Iris Baker
- Status: Paroled in October 2008
- Criminal charges: Drug smuggling
- Penalty: 11 years' imprisonment, ¥3,000,000 fine

Nicholas John 'Nick' Baker is a British citizen who was convicted of smuggling cocaine and ecstasy into Japan. He was arrested at Narita Airport on 13 April 2002 and found guilty by the Chiba Prefecture District Court in June 2003. He was sentenced to 14 years' jail with forced labour and fined ¥5,000,000. At his trial Baker claimed that he was tricked by his travelling companion, James Prunier, into carrying the drugs through customs in a false-bottomed suitcase. Baker also claimed that during his initial detention he was mistreated by Japanese authorities with sleep deprivation, no access to legal counsel, and that he was forced to sign a confession written in poor and inaccurate English. Baker's conviction was upheld on appeal but Baker's sentence was reduced to 11 years in prison and the fine to ¥3,000,000. Baker was transferred back to England in the Spring of 2008 to serve the remainder of his sentence. After spending six-months at London's Wandsworth prison, Baker was released on licence in October 2008.

== Background and arrest ==
Baker, a trained chef and former sandwich-shop manager, ran a fencing business in his home town of Stroud, Gloucestershire, where he lived with his fiancée and their baby son. Baker had met Prunier 3 years before through a mutual interest in football. Prunier had problems with depression, drug and alcohol abuse, and later admitted that he had been involved in criminal activities at this time.

Baker said that Prunier and he, who had been travelling together in Europe, had decided to go to Japan before the 2002 FIFA World Cup to buy souvenirs and allow Prunier to rent a flat for the tournament. Baker and Prunier left Brussels National Airport in Belgium on 12 April, transited through London's Heathrow Airport and arrived at Tokyo's Narita airport at approximately 11:00 a.m. JST, on 13 April 2002.

Baker claimed in a later statement that he had been drinking and was tired from the long flight. He reported that after Prunier and he were split-up at airport immigration, they had met up again at the baggage carousel, and Prunier had told him "I haven't seen your bag yet, Nick. You grab this and get in a queue and I'll join you when yours comes out." When the bag Baker was carrying was searched in customs, 41,120 tablets of ecstasy and 992.5 grams of cocaine were found hidden in false compartments of the suitcase, the largest single illegal drugs haul at Narita airport at that time.

Baker, who has a heavy regional accent, reported that he had told the customs officials, who had limited English language skills, that the case was Prunier's. According to the prosecution at his trial, Baker had the suitcase key in his possession, and threw it into the suitcase during the search. Prunier passed through customs, and although Japanese police monitored his mobile telephone conversations and his movements (including photographing his departure from Japan two days later), he was not detained or questioned.

== Initial detention ==
As is customary in Japan, following his arrest Nick Baker was detained for 23 days and questioned without access to a lawyer. Baker reported that he was interrogated by as many as six police officers at any one time, shackled to a chair, with his hands tied behind his back. Baker claimed that throughout this period the lights were kept on so he could not sleep and that he did not eat for 20 days. Baker denied that the suitcase was his and claimed that Prunier had tricked him into carrying it through customs. However, at the end of the detention period, he signed a statement in Japanese that during the trial was seen as inconsistent and self-incriminating. Baroness Sarah Ludford, a member of the European Parliament and justice spokeswoman for the United Kingdom's Liberal Democratic Party, criticized the quality of the Japanese-English interpretation during the interrogation, and noted that Baker was required to sign a witness statement in Japanese, a language he did not understand. Baker later claimed that the police had told him that if he signed a statement he would be incriminating Prunier and that he would be allowed to return home. Baker was indicted on 1 May for violation of the Narcotic and Psychotropic Drug Control Law, and Customs Law.

Baker's mother reported that his health had deteriorated during his detention including bleeding gums, a broken finger, daily headaches, severe depression, and extreme back pain caused by sitting on the concrete floor. Until the start of his trial ten months later, Baker was kept in solitary confinement for refusing to admit his guilt, and put on suicide watch because of depression.

== Chiba District Court trial ==
The trial, which opened in February 2003, centred on whether Baker had been aware of the contents of the suitcase as well as an examination of the interrogation records and the confession he had signed. Baker claimed that the statement was mispresentation of his words and his lawyer, Shunji Miyake, argued that since there was no video or audio recording of the interrogations, and no defence lawyer was present, there was no way to check whether falsifications and mistranslations had taken place. Miyake also questioned what he claimed were the 'leading nature' of the questions asked by the interrogators. Baker maintained that the bag was Prunier's, that he had never had the key to the case, and that he had been tricked into carrying the bag by Prunier. Prunier had been arrested for drug smuggling in Belgium a month after Baker's arrest, and his co-accused in the Belgian case had also claimed that Prunier had duped them into carrying bags with drugs. The court ruled the evidence from the Belgian police was inadmissible, and it was not introduced during the trial.

In June 2003, the presiding judge, Kenji Kadoya, who had never found a defendant innocent in a career spanning more than a decade, found Baker guilty. He said Baker must have known the contents of the case because he had carried the key and had told customs officials and prosecutors that the case belonged to him. The judge also noted a signed confession, which implied Baker knew he was carrying drugs in the bag.

In the three-hour judgment, which was an almost word-for-word copy of the prosecution's argument, Kadoya said "This is a heinous crime. "This amount of drugs was a record. If they had entered our country, they would have harmed a large number of people." In June 2003, Baker was sentenced to 14 years in prison with forced labour and a ¥5,000,000 fine. Baker's lawyer said Baker had been punished more heavily because he had protested his innocence rather than confessing, which is the usual method by which prosecutors secure convictions.

In August 2003, James Prunier was interviewed on Central TV about the case. He admitted to being involved in drug smuggling, but denied that he had framed Baker, claiming that Baker was aware of the contents of the case. He subsequently committed suicide in August 2004, while on bail for the Belgian case.

== Tokyo High Court appeal ==
The High Court appeal began March 2004. The defence argued that poor translation during police interrogations and during the district court trial had affected the outcome of the trial and submitted expert testimony about translation errors. They also suggested that the investigation was improperly conducted, that there were inconsistencies in official reports, and that important evidence, such as the Belgian information, had been ignored at the original trial.

On 27 October 2005 the presiding judge upheld the guilty verdict, rejecting defence suggestions. The judge questioned why Baker had travelled to Japan after Prunier had told him "If anything goes wrong on the way to Japan, your family will be killed." He also noted that the drugs were very skillfully hidden, and that more than half of the contents of the suitcase belonged to Baker, suggesting that it belonged to him. The judge also commented that "the defendant has not reflected sincerely on his acts." However, he reduced the sentence from 14 years to 11 years noting that Baker did not seem to be the mastermind, and his family had been worried about him. Baker's fine was also reduced from ¥5,000,000 (approximately £24,392) to ¥3,000,000 (approximately £14,635). This had to be paid within four weeks or he would have to serve an extra 150 days of hard labour.

In November 2005, Baker decided not to appeal to Japan's Supreme Court and was transferred to Fuchu Prison to begin serving his sentence. Having served one third of his sentence, Nick Baker was transferred back to England in the spring of 2008 to serve the remainder of his sentence. After six months at London's Wandsworth prison he was released on licence in October 2008.

== Reactions ==
In April 2003, Baker's mother Iris publicly stated her belief that Nick Baker was innocent and had been framed. She subsequently led a campaign against her son's allegedly unfair trial, for better prison treatment and more recently for a transfer back to a UK prison. Campaign actions including presenting a petition signed by more than 1,000 people, including several Members of European Parliament, to Tony Blair at 10 Downing Street.

In July 2003, Lady Ludford called for Tony Blair to raise the issue during a summit with his Japanese counterpart Junichiro Koizumi though he did not do so. A question was raised in the British House of Commons in 2004 regarding progress of the case and Baker's health and confinement conditions. Mark Devlin, who at the time was the publisher of Metropolis, initially supported the Nick Baker campaign but withdrew his support in 2004 and publicly criticized the support group's campaign tactics.

The International Bar Association cited problems specific to the Baker case, particularly the lack of any recordings of interrogations in a 2006 report. Fair Trials Abroad, director Stephen Jakobi said Baker's case raised major concerns regarding the Japanese justice system and its compliance with the International Covenant on Civil and Political Rights, and pointed out Senrikinran University linguistics Professor Makiko Mizuno's criticism of the Japanese judiciary's understanding of what constitutes an able interpreter.

== See also ==
- Criminal justice system of Japan
- Japanese law
