= Nick Kenny =

Nick Kenny may refer to:

- Nick Kenny (rugby league), Australian rugby league footballer
- Nick Kenny (poet), American poet, newspaper columnist, and song lyricist
- Nick Kenny (darts player) (born 1993), Welsh darts player
