= Nick Vincent =

Nick Vincent may refer to:

- Nick Vincent (musician) (born 1958), American drummer, producer and composer
- Nick Vincent (baseball) (born 1986), American baseball pitcher
