= Nick Webb =

Nick Webb may refer to:

- Nick Webb (musician) (1954–1998), British musician and founder of Acoustic Alchemy
- Nick Webb (soccer) (born 1986), American professional soccer player
- Nick Webb (journalist) (born 1971), Irish newspaper journalist and author
- Nick Webb (boxer) (born 1987), British boxer
