= Nick Perry =

Nick Perry may refer to:

- N. Nick Perry (born 1950), American politician
- Nick Perry (linebacker) (born 1990), American football player
- Nick Perry (safety) (born 1991), American football player and coach
- Nick Perry (British Army officer), British general
- Nick Perry (journalist), American and New Zealand journalist
- Nick Perry (writer), British playwright and screenwriter
- Nicholas Perry (better known as Nikocado Avocado), Internet personality
- Nick Perry (1916–2003), mastermind of the 1980 Pennsylvania Lottery scandal
