= Nick Fitzgerald =

Nick or Nicholas Fitzgerald may refer to:

- Nicholas Fitzgerald (politician) (1829–1908), Australian politician
- Nick Fitzgerald (soccer) (born 1992), Australian soccer player
- Nick Fitzgerald (American football) (born 1996), American football player
