= Nick King =

Nick King may refer to:

- Nick King (politician) (born 1949), member of the Missouri House of Representatives
- Nick King (basketball) (born 1995), American basketball player
- Nick King (music executive), co-founder of Get Better Records

== See also ==
- Nicholas King (1933–2012), American actor and horticulturist
- Nicholas King (judge) (born 1945), American lawyer
