= Nick Robinson =

Nicholas, Nicky or Nick Robinson may refer to:

- Nick Robinson (journalist) (born 1963), British political journalist
- Nick Robinson (paperfolder) (born 1957), British origami artist
- Nicky Robinson (rugby union) (born 1982), Welsh rugby player
- Nick Robinson (English actor) (born 1986), British actor
- Nick Robinson (American actor) (born 1995), American actor
- Nicholas Robinson (historian) (born 1946), Irish author, historian, solicitor and political cartoonist
- Nicky Robinson (game programmer), computer game programmer
- Nicholas Robinson (bishop) (died 1585), Welsh bishop of Bangor
- Nicholas Robinson (physician) (1697?–1775), Welsh physician
- Nicholas Robinson (mayor) (1769–1854), Lord Mayor of Liverpool
- Nick Robinson (basketball) (born 1979), college basketball head coach
- Nick Robinson (YouTuber) (born 1989?), American video game journalist
