= Electric Avenue, Brixton =

Street in Brixton, London

Coordinates: 51.46229°N 0.11377°W

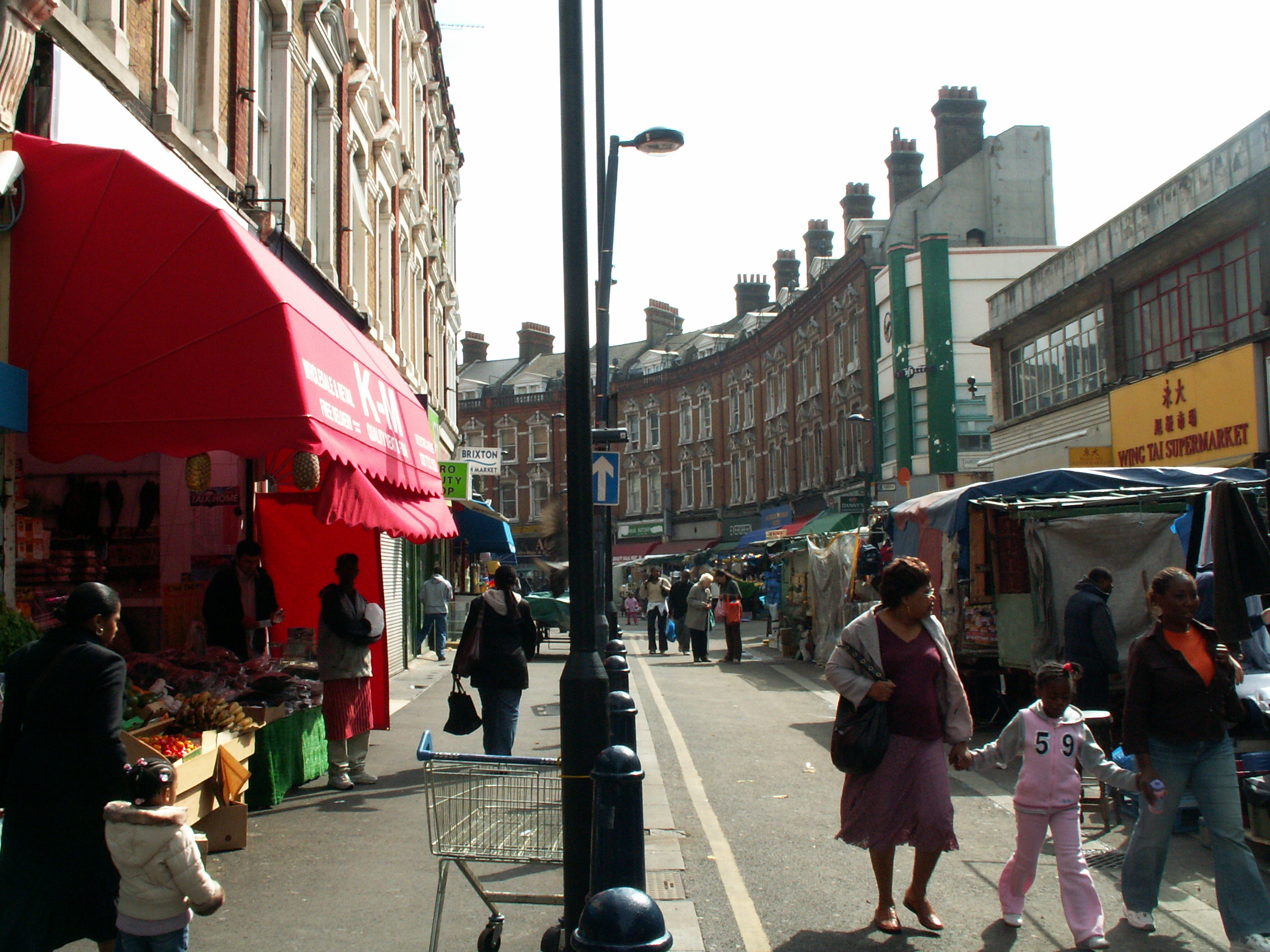
Brixton Market in Electric Avenue, 2007

Electric Avenue is a street in Brixton, London, built in 1888. It was the first market street to be lit by electric lights. Today, Electric Avenue has national retail chains (Boots, Greggs, and Iceland), as well as various local food and housewares retailers. It also hosts a part of Brixton Market, which specialises in selling African, Caribbean, South American, and South Asian products. It is located just around the corner from Brixton Underground station (1972). The street originally had cast iron Victorian canopies over the pavement, which were damaged in World War II and removed in the 1980s.

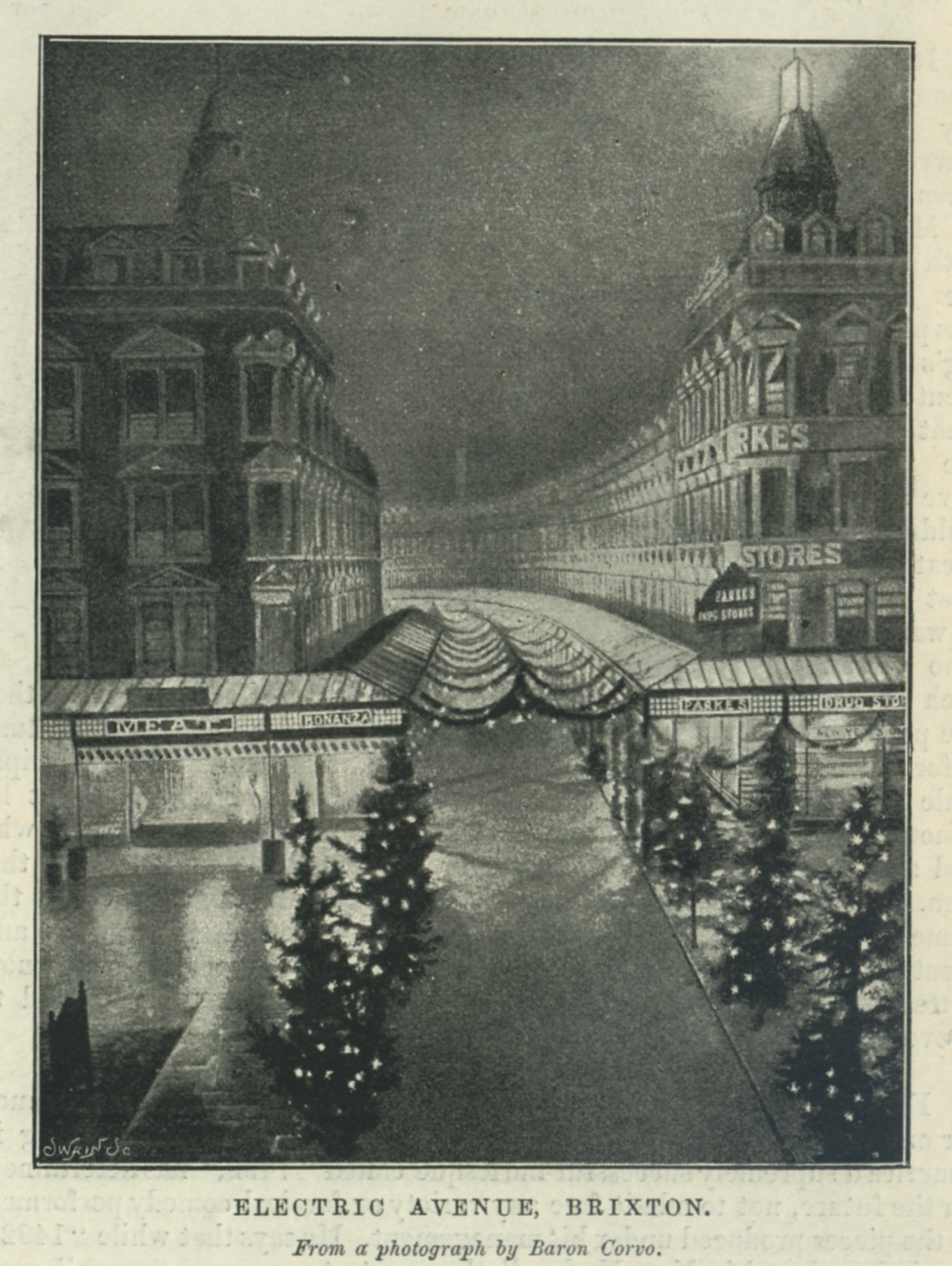
Electric Avenue, after Baron Corvo, 1895

== History ==
The road is referenced in Eddy Grant's 1983 single "Electric Avenue", which reached No. 2 on both the UK and US singles charts. The song itself was inspired by the 1981 Brixton riot.

On 17 April 1999, the neo-Nazi bomber David Copeland planted a nail bomb outside a supermarket in Brixton Road with the intention of igniting a race war across Britain. A market trader became suspicious and moved the device to a less crowded area of Electric Avenue, where 39 people were injured in its explosion.

In 2016, Eddy Grant was invited to switch on a new illuminated street sign installed as part of a £1 million refurbishment. Afterwards, Grant was given one of the previous signs as a keepsake.

== Notable people ==
In 1938, the musical double act Bob and Alf Pearson lived at 27a Electric Avenue, with Bob's wife Vera.
