= Nick Scott (bodybuilder) =

Bodybuilder & author

Nick Scott is a disabled professional bodybuilder, wheelchair ballroom dancer, author, and motivational speaker.

== Biography ==
Scott lost nearly all use of his legs in a car accident at the age of 16. Shortly afterward he started weight training, going on to compete and win in powerlifting competitions in the bench press.

As a bodybuilder, he helped to develop the sport of wheelchair bodybuilding, organising the first IFBB Pro Wheelchair Championships in 2011, and getting the IFBB Professional Wheelchair Division added to the Arnold Classic in 2016.

As a professional wheelchair ballroom dancer, he and his partner Aubree Marchione have competed at the national and international level, becoming number one in the sport in the United States, and dancing in front of Pope Francis in 2015.

His film Perspective, about his own story, won Overall Best Film at the 2011 Arnold Sports Film Festival.
