= Nick Baker (Kentucky politician) =

American politician (1937–2026)

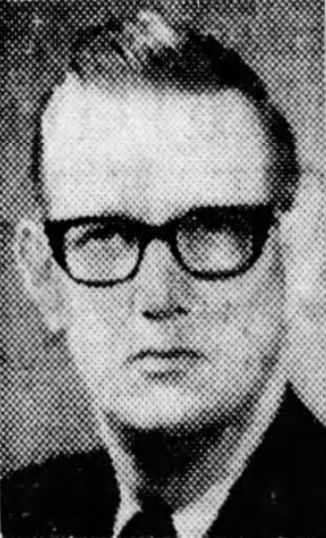
- Baker in 1969

Member of the Kentucky Senate from the 38th district
- In office January 1, 1970 – January 1, 1978
- Preceded by: Vernon McGinty
- Succeeded by: Danny Meyer

Personal details
- Born: Henry Nicholas Baker; April 10, 1937 Hazard, Kentucky, U.S.
- Died: March 13, 2026 (aged 88) Louisville, Kentucky, U.S.
- Party: Democratic
- Education: Georgetown College (BA); University of Louisville (JD)

Henry Nicholas Baker (April 10, 1937 – March 13, 2026) was an American politician from Kentucky who was a member of the Kentucky Senate from 1970 to 1978. He was known for his efforts to promote women's basketball in Kentucky at the high school and collegiate levels.

== Early life ==
Henry Nicholas Baker was born in Hazard, Kentucky, on April 10, 1937. After graduating from Hazard High School in 1955, Baker attended Georgetown College, where he was a member of the Kappa Alpha Order. He studied briefly at the University of Kentucky, where he knew future governor John Y. Brown Jr. Baker then returned to Georgetown, from which he graduated in 1959. He then joined the U.S. Army Reserve and served six months of active duty. Baker moved to Louisville in 1960 and began law school at the University of Louisville School of Law. Before graduating in 1966, he worked for the General Motors Acceptance Corporation as an insurance claims adjuster.

== Kentucky Senate ==
Baker was first elected to the senate in 1969, defeating incumbent Republican senator Vernon McGinty. He won reelection in 1973, but was defeated for renomination in 1977 by Danny Meyer.

During his time in the senate, Baker was a member of the committees on transportation, the judiciary, and cities; the latter of which he served as chair. Legislation sponsored by Baker included bills to standardize the colors of emergency vehicle lights and to standardize the system of license plate numbering. The license plate bill was also amended in committee to include a provision requiring license plates to be reflective. He additionally introduced a bill written by Louisville mayor Frank W. Burke to allocate federal funds for the city's parks. Baker later referred to the parks bill as a "breeze bill," or one that would pass without opposition.

On June 15, 1972, Baker was one of 20 Democratic senators that voted for Kentucky to ratify the Equal Rights Amendment.

Baker served with Georgia Davis Powers, the first African American elected to the senate. In 2010, he was interviewed by Anne Onyekwuluje and discussed his work with her, her influence, and the civil rights movement.

=== Senate Bill 73 ===
In 1974, Baker introduced Senate Bill 73. The bill required that any school with a men's basketball team that received state funds would also have to establish a women's team as well; women's basketball had been discontinued in Kentucky since 1932. As the Kentucky Historical Society would later note, the bill "met opposition from schools that did not want the extra cost associated with a girls’ team or the issues sharing facilities would bring ... but Baker persisted and it passed."

== Family and relatives ==
Baker's mother played basketball in the late 1920s to early 1930s and was a member of Hazard High School's 1930 state championship team. Baker was the nephew of Gene Baker, who was the Republican candidate for the 23rd Senate district in 1955. Additionally, his uncle by marriage was Bill Engle, who was a Democratic member of the house and senate.

== Death ==
Baker died on March 13, 2026, in Louisville at the age of 88 and was buried in Cave Hill Cemetery. On March 26, the senate adopted a resolution to adjourn in honor of Baker's life and memory. Senator Brandon Smith, who introduced the resolution, noted that "for all of us in here who have had children and daughters that have played basketball, it is a nice nod back to the past, that this gentleman revived the sport to give our daughters a chance and many others in the state to be able to participate in the sport again, and enjoy it the way they do." The House of Representatives also adjourned in Baker's honor on March 20.
