= Denver Butler Sr. =

American politician (1938–2009)

Denver Butler

Member of the Kentucky House of Representatives from the 38th district
- In office January 1, 1989 – January 1, 2007
- Preceded by: Dan Seum
- Succeeded by: Tim Firkins

Personal details
- Born: December 31, 1938 Breckinridge County, Kentucky, U.S.
- Died: December 29, 2009 (aged 70) Louisville, Kentucky, U.S.
- Party: Democratic

Denver Earl Butler Sr. (December 31, 1938 – December 29, 2009) was an American politician and a Democratic member of the Kentucky House of Representatives representing District 38 from January 1989 until January 2007. He did not seek reelection in 2006.

== Elections ==
- 1988 Butler was initially elected in the 1988 Democratic Primary and November 8, 1988, general election, and re-elected in the general elections of November 6, 1990, and November 3, 1992.
- 1994 Butler was unopposed for both the 1994 Democratic Primary and the November 8, 1994 General election.
- 1996 Butler was unopposed for both the 1996 Democratic Primary and the November 5, 1996 General election.
- 1998 Butler was unopposed for the 1998 Democratic Primary and won the November 3, 1998 General election against Republican nominee Robert Wood.
- 2000 Butler was unopposed for the 2000 Democratic Primary and won the November 7, 2000 General election with 8,757 votes (70.0%) against Republican nominee Rondell Birge.
- 2002 Butler was challenged in the 2002 Democratic Primary, winning with 2,456 votes (74.0%) and was unopposed for the November 5, 2002 General election, winning with 7,496 votes.
- 2004 Butler was unopposed for the 2004 Democratic Primary and won the November 2, 2004 General election with 8,508 votes (58.8%) against Republican nominee Paul Hosse.
