= Nicolás Martínez (footballer, born 1998) =

Uruguayan footballer

Personal information
- Full name: Nicolás Sebastián Martínez Remírez
- Date of birth: 1 August 1998 (age 28)
- Place of birth: Montevideo, Uruguay
- Height: 1.80 m (5 ft 11 in)
- Position: Goalkeeper

Senior career*
| Years | Team | Apps | (Gls) |
| 2015–2018 | Villa Española | 1 | (0) |
- * Club domestic league appearances and goals as of 01:10, 19 December 2018 (UTC)

Nicolás Sebastián Martínez Remírez (born 1 August 1998) is a Uruguayan professional footballer who plays as a goalkeeper.

== Career ==
Martínez's career started in Villa Española's ranks. He first appeared on a first-team teamsheet in November 2015 as the goalkeeper was an unused substitute for a match with Miramar Misiones in the Uruguayan Segunda División, as he was two years following against Villa Teresa. He was on the bench sixteen times during the 2018 season, before eventually making his senior debut on 19 August as Villa Española drew 4–4 with Tacuarembó at the Estadio Goyenola on their way to placing tenth.

== Career statistics ==
As of 19 December 2018.

Club statistics
| Club | Season | League | | | Cup | | League Cup | | Continental | | Other | | Total | |
| Club | Season | Division | Apps | Goals | Apps | Goals | Apps | Goals | Apps | Goals | Apps | Goals | Apps | Goals |
|---|---|---|---|---|---|---|---|---|---|---|---|---|---|---|
| Villa Española | 2015–16 | Segunda División | 0 | 0 | — | | — | | — | | 0 | 0 | 0 | 0 |
| Villa Española | 2016 | Segunda División | 0 | 0 | — | | — | | — | | 0 | 0 | 0 | 0 |
| Villa Española | 2017 | Segunda División | 0 | 0 | — | | — | | — | | 0 | 0 | 0 | 0 |
| Villa Española | 2018 | Segunda División | 1 | 0 | — | | — | | — | | 0 | 0 | 1 | 0 |
| Career total | | | 1 | 0 | — | | — | | — | | 0 | 0 | 1 | 0 |
