= Nick Whyatt =

English ice hockey player

- Born: 8 August 1984 (age 40); Nottingham, England, U.K.
- Height: 6 ft 2 in (188 cm)
- Weight: 170 lb (77 kg; 12 st 2 lb)
- Position: Forward
- Shot: Left
- Played for: Coventry Blaze NIHL; Liège Bulldogs; Nottingham Lions; Sheffield Spartans
- Playing career: 2002–2015

Nick Whyatt (born 8 August 1984) is an English former professional ice hockey player. In 2002, he began his career, lining up for his local team, the Nottingham Lions, playing 25 times at ENIL level. The English National Ice Hockey League is regarded as the third tier of ice hockey in the U.K.

Whyatt would continue in the ENIL, signing for the Solihull Kings the following season. He would remain here for the next three years, totalling 14 points in 31 games. Whyatt stayed in the Solihull area, playing for the Solihull Barons in the EPL. At this higher standard, Whyatt continued to play and iced on no less than 48 occasions throughout the 2005/06 season.

After three years in Solihull, Whyatt decided to move, signing for the Telford Tigers, again of the EPL. When playing for the Tigers, Whyatt proved to be a physical player, totalling 120 penalty minutes in just over forty games. In the summer of 2007, Whyatt was snapped up by the Manchester Phoenix, a team playing at the highest level of ice hockey in Britain, the EIHL. Whyatt had previously trialled for the Phoenix in the summer of 2003, but had been turned down on that occasion.

Despite a solid season for Manchester, Whyatt was released in the summer of 2008 as part of a complete rebuilding by head coach Tony Hand. On 23 September 2008 a move to Belgian Hockey League team Bulldogs Liège was confirmed, although this agreement was short lived and Whyatt moved back to the UK to be with his longtime girlfriend Chloe Jarvis, a drama student at The University of Lincoln and signed with the Coventry Blaze organisation to ice for their ENIHL level team.
