= Nick Thompson =

Nick or Nicholas Thompson may refer to:

- Nick Thompson (field hockey) (born 1967), English field hockey player
- Nick Thompson (fighter) (born 1981), American mixed martial artist
- Nick Thompson (politician) (born 1966), American politician
- Nick Thompson (sailor) (born 1986), British sailor
- Nicholas Thompson (editor), American journalist and musician
- Nicholas Thompson (golfer) (born 1982), American golf player
- Nick Thompson (businessman) (born 1968), British businessman
- Nicholas Marcus Thompson (born 1986), Trinidadian-Canadian social justice advocate and union leader
