= Nick Lee =

Nick Lee may refer to:

- Nick Lee (actor), Irish actor
- Nick Lee (cricketer) (born 1983), English cricketer
- Nick Lee (sprinter), winner of the 1965 4 × 440 yard relay at the NCAA Division I Indoor Track and Field Championships
- Nick Lee (wrestler) (born 1998), American freestyle and folkstyle wrestler

== See also ==
- Nick Leeson, English former derivatives trader
