= Nicholas =

Male given name

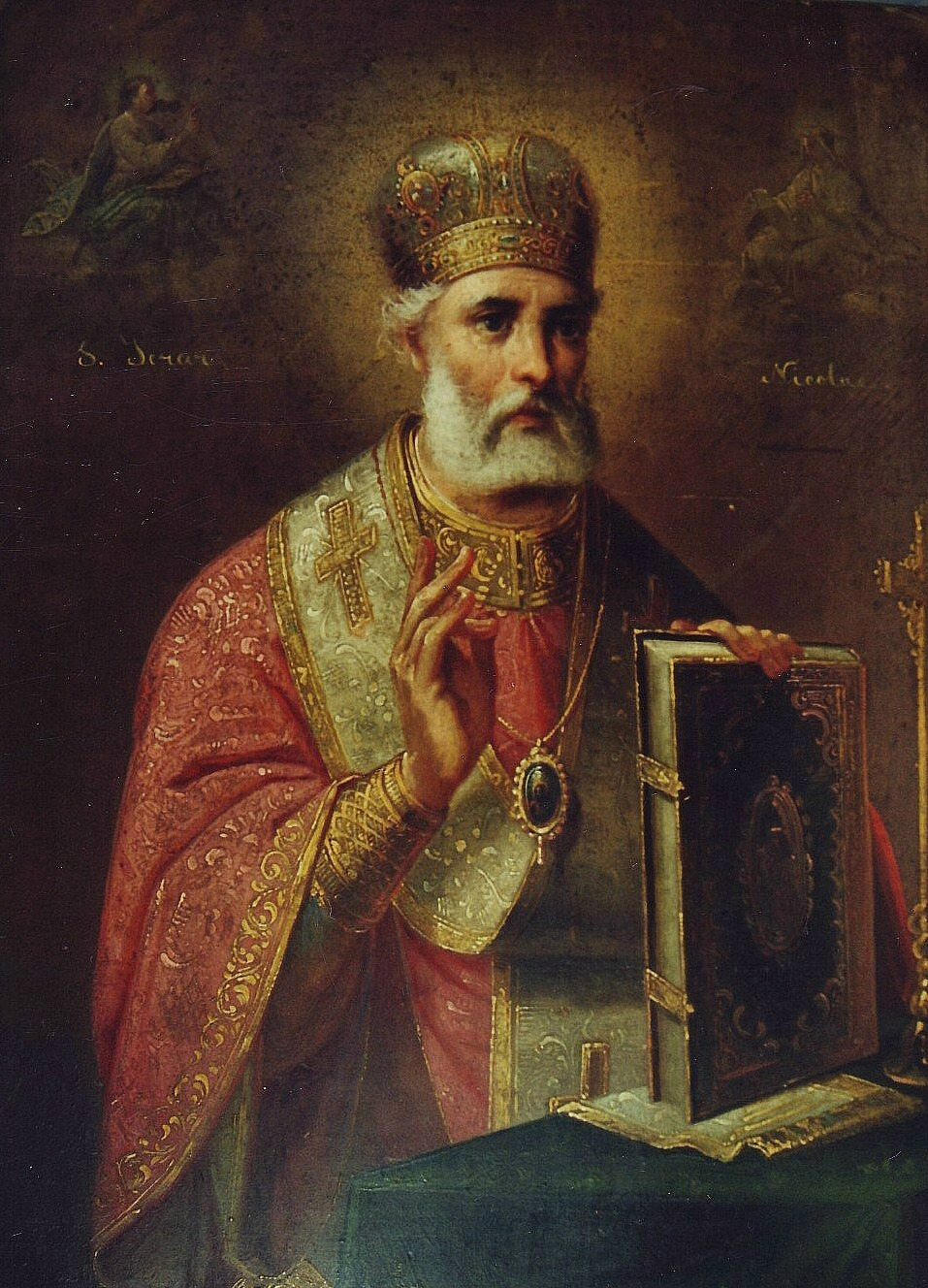
- Saint Nicholas by Gheorghe Tattarescu
- Pronunciation: /ˈnɪk.ə.ləs/ NICK-uh-liss
- Gender: Male

Origin
- Origin: Greek
- Meaning: "Victory of the people"

Other names
- Nicknames: Nick, Nicky, Nic, Cole
- Derived: Νῑκόλᾱος (Nikólaos)
- Related names: Colin, Collin, Nicolas, Miklós, Mikalai, Nicander, Nicanor, Niccolò, Nickolas, Nico, Nicol, Nicola, Nicolaas, Nicolae, Nicolao, Nicolau, Nicolay, Nicole, Nicolle, Nikita, Niklas, Nikola, Nikolai, Nikolaos, Nikolas, Nikolaus, Nikolla, Nikollë, Nikos

Nicholas is a male name, the Anglophone version of an ancient Greek name in use since antiquity, and cognate with the modern Greek Νικόλαος, Nikolaos. It originally derived from a combination of two Greek words meaning 'victory' and 'people'. In turn, the name means "victory of the people."

The name has been widely used in countries with significant Christian populations, owing in part to the veneration of Saint Nicholas, which became increasingly prominent in Western Europe from the 11th century. Revered as a saint in many Christian denominations, the Eastern Orthodox, Catholic, and Anglican Churches all celebrate Saint Nicholas Day on December 6. In maritime regions throughout Europe, the name and its derivatives have been especially popular, as St Nicholas is considered the protector saint of seafarers. This remains particularly so in Greece, where St Nicholas is the patron saint of the Hellenic Navy.

== Origins ==
The name derives from the Ancient Greek: Νῑκόλᾱος, romanized: Nikólaos. It is understood to mean 'victory of the people', being a compound of two Greek words, νίκη, nī́kē 'victory' and λᾱός, lāós 'people'. An ancient paretymology (a false etymology) of the latter element, λᾱός, is that it originates from λᾶς, lâs (a contracted form of λᾶας, lâas), meaning 'stone' or 'rock'. This is in reference to the story of Deucalion and Pyrrha from Greek mythology. As the sole survivors of a catastrophic deluge, they were able to repopulate the world by throwing stones behind them, over their shoulders, while they kept marching on. The stones formed men and women where they landed.

The name became popular through Saint Nicholas, Bishop of Myra in Lycia, the inspiration for Santa Claus, but it predates said bishop by several centuries: the Athenian historian Thucydides for example, mentions that in the second year of the Peloponnesian War (431–404 BC) between Sparta and Athens, the Spartans sent a delegation to the Persian king to ask for his help to fight the Athenians; a certain Nikolaos was one of the delegates.

The customary English spelling Nicholas, using a ch, as though the word were spelled in Greek with a chi, first came into use in the 12th century and has been firmly established since the Reformation, although the spelling Nicolas is occasionally used.

In Scotland, until the late nineteenth century, fishing communities used Nicholas as a female name.

== Male variations ==
Variations for males include:

- Afrikaans: Nicolaas, Niklaas
- Albanian: Nikolas, Nikolla, Nikollë, Nikë, Klaus, Nikolin, Kolë
- Arabic: نِقُولَا (Niqūlā)
- Aragonese: Nicolau
- Armenian: Նիկողայոս (Nikog(h)ayos, Nigog(h)ayos), Նիկողոս (Nikog(h)os, Nigog(h)os)
- Asturleonese: Nicolás, Nicu, Colás
- Basque: Nikola
- Belarusian: Мікалай (Mikalai), Мікола (Mikola)
- Breton: Nikolaz
- Bulgarian: Никола (Nikola), Николай (Nikolay), Никлен (Niklen), Никулица (Nikùlitsa), Коле (Kole), Кольо (Kolyo), Колю (Kolyu)
- Catalan: Nicolau
- Chuvash: Mikulaj
- Croatian: Nikola, Nikolac, Niko, Nikolaj
- Czech: Nikolas, Nicolas, Mikuláš
- Dhivehi: ނިކޮލަސް (Nikolas)
- Danish: Niklas, Klaus, Nikolas, Niels, Nicklas, Nikolai, Nicolai, Nicolas, Nikolaj, Niclas, Nilas, Claus, Nis
- Dutch: Nikolaas, Klaas, Nicolas, Nicolaas, Niek, Nico, Niels, Claas, Claes
- Esperanto: Niĉjo, Niko, Nikolao
- Estonian: Nigulas, Nicolas, Nigul, Mikk, Niilo
- Finnish: Niklas, Niko, Niilo, Nikolai, Nicolas, Launo, Nikol
- French: Nicolas, Nico, Colin, Colas
- Galician: Nicolao, Nicolau
- Georgian: ნიკოლოზ (Nikoloz), ნიკო (Niko), ნიკა (Nika), კოლა (Kola)
- German: Nikolaus, Niklas, Niklaus, Nikolaus, Nickolas, Nicolas, Nickolaus, Nikolo, Nicolaus, Niko, Nico, Klaus, Claus, Klas
- Greek: Νικόλαος (Nikolaos), Νικόλας (Nikolas), Νίκος (Nikos), Νικολής (Nikolis)
- Hungarian: Miklós, Nikolasz, Klausz, Mikulás (only for Santa Claus), Mikó, Mikes, Miksa
- Icelandic: Nikulás, Nicolas, Níels, Nils
- Indonesian: Nicholas, Nicolas, Niko, Nikola, Nickolas, Nicko, Nick
- Iranian: Nik
- Irish: Nioclás
- Italian: Niccolò, Nicolas, Nicolò, Nicola, Niccola, Nicolao
- Japanese: ニコラス (Nikorasu)
- Latin: Nicolaus
- Latvian: Niklāvs, Klāvs, Nikolass, Nikolajs
- Lithuanian: Mikalojus, Nikolajus
- Low German: Nikolaas, Klaus, Nicolaas, Klaas, Nikolas
- Luxembourgish: Nicolas
- Macedonian: Никола (Nikola), Коле (Kole), Кољо (Koljo), Николче (Nikolče), Николе (Nikole)
- Malay: Nikkolas
- Maltese: Nikola
- Māori: Nikora
- Norwegian: Nils, Nikolai, Nicolas
- Persian: نیک (Nik)
- Polish: Mikołaj, Mikołajek, Nikolas, Nicolas, Mik
- Portuguese: Nicolau, Nícolas, Nicola
- Romanian: Nicolae, Nicolas, Nicușor, Nicoară (old variant inherited from Latin), Neculai, Niculae, Nicu
- Russian: Николай (Nikolai), Коля (Kolya)
- Scottish Gaelic: Neacel, Nichol, Nicol, Caelan, Calen, Nicolas
- Serbian: Никола (Nikola), Ниџа (Nidža), Ниџо (Nidžo), Нико (Niko)
- Slovak: Mikuláš, Nikolas, Mikoláš, Nicolas
- Slovene: Miklavž, Niko, Nikolaj
- Spanish: Nicolás, Nikolas
- Swedish: Nels, Niklas, Niclas, Nicklas, Nils, Klas, Claes, Nicolas
- Tongan: Nikolasi
- Tatar: Микулай (Miqulay)
- Ukrainian: Микола (Mykola), Миколай (Mykolai)
- Upper Sorbian: Mikławš
- West Frisian: Klaes
- Yakut: Ньукулай (Ńukulay)

== Female forms ==
Female forms include:

- Bulgarian: Николина (Nikolina), Николета (Nikoleta), Никол (Nikol), Нина (Nina)
- Czech: Nikol, Nikoleta, Nikola, Nicol
- Dutch: Klasina, Klazina, Nicole, Nicolien, Nicolet, Nicoline
- Danish: Nikoline
- English: Nicole/Nichole, Nicola/Nichola
- French: Colette, Coline, Nicole, Nicolette, Nicoline, Cosette
- German: Nikol, Nikole, Nikola, Nicole, Nicola
- Greek: Νίκη (Níkē, a conflation with Níke), Νικολέτα (Nikoléta), Νικολίνα (Νikolína)
- Hungarian: Nikolett
- Indonesian: Nicole, Niki, Nicola
- Italian: Nicoletta, Nicole, Nicolina
- Macedonian: Николина (Nikolina)
- Norwegian: Nilsine, Nicoline
- Polish: Nikola
- Portuguese: Nicole
- Romanian: Niculina, Nicoleta
- Scottish: Nicola, Nicholas (Lowlands 18th/19th century)
- Serbo-Croatian: Nikolija (archaic), Nikolina, Nikoleta
- Slovak: Nikola, Nikoleta
- Slovene: Nika
- Spanish: Nicol, Nicoleta, Nicoletta, Nikol, Nicole.

== People known as Nicholas ==
=== Single name (rulers, popes, patriarch and antipopes) ===
- Antipope Nicholas V
- Nicholas I of Russia
- Nicholas II of Russia
- Nikola I Petrović-Njegoš (1840–1921) King of Montenegro
- Patriarchs of Constantinople, of which the best known are Nicholas Mystikos and Nicholas III Grammatikos
- Prince Nicholas of Romania (1903–1978)
- Pope Nicholas I
- Pope Nicholas II
- Pope Nicholas III
- Pope Nicholas IV
- Pope Nicholas V

=== Given name ===
- Nicholas Abercrombie (born 1944), English academic and sociologist
- Nicholas Dias Abeysinghe (1719–1794), Ceylonese–Dutch colonial administrator
- Nicholas Abram (1589–1655), French Jesuit and theologian
- Nicholas Yaw Boafo Adade (1927–2013), Ghanaian judge
- Nicholas Adams, several people
- Nicholas Addlery (born 1981), Jamaican soccer player
- Nicholas Agar (born 1965), New Zealand professor
- Nicholas Alahverdian (born 1987), American sex offender
- Nicholas Albery (1948–2001), English author and social inventor
- Nicholas Alexander, several people
- Nicholas Alexis, Trinidadian cricketer
- Nicholas Alipui, Ghanaian humanitarian
- Nicholas Alkemade (1922–1987) British tail gunner
- Nicholas Allard (born 1952), American attorney
- Nicholas Allenby (1909–1995), English Anglican clergyman
- Nicholas Amankwah (born 1984), Ghanaian politician
- Nicholas R. Amato (born 1940), American politician
- Nicholas Ambraseys (1929–2012), Greek engineering seismologist
- Nicholas Amhurst (1697–1742), English poet and political writer
- Nicholas Ammeter (born 2000), Swiss soccer player
- Nicholas Amoako (born 1997), Ghanaian soccer player
- Nicholas Amponsah (born 1997), Ghanaian soccer player
- Nicholas Anderson, several people
- Nicholas Angelich (1970–2022), American pianist
- Nicholas Angell (born 1979), American ice hockey player
- Nicholas Archibald (born 1975), Scottish cricketer
- Nicholas Arciniaga (born 1983), American long-distance runner
- Nicholas Armstrong (born 1975), English cricketer
- Nicholas Armstrong (born 2001), American Youtuber also known as Sapnap
- Nicholas Arnesson (ca. 1150 – 1225), Norwegian bishop and nobleman
- Nicholas Arnold, several people
- Nicholas Art (born 1999), American former child actor
- Nicholas Asbury (born 1971), British actor and author
- Nicholas Anthony Ascioti (born 1974), American composer and conductor
- Nicholas Ashmore (born 1961), British military officer
- Nicholas Ashton (1904–1986), English cricketer
- Nicholas Asmussen (1871–1941), German–born Canadian politician and building contractor
- Nicholas Asselta (born 1951), American politician
- Nicholas Ayache (born 1958), French computer scientist
- Nicholas Bacon (disambiguation), several people
- Nicholas Bagenal (c. 1509–1591), English soldier and politician
- Nicholas Baptiste (born 1995), Haitian–Canadian ice hockey player
- Nicholas Barbon (c. 1640 – c. 1698), English economist, physician, and financial speculator
- Nicholas Barré (1621–1686), French Catholic priest
- Nicholas Basbanes (born 1943), American author
- Nicholas Bayard (1644–1707), Dutch–born American slave trader
- Nicholas Bayard (theologian) (fl. 1300?), Dominican theologian
- Nicholas Baylies (1768–1847), American judge, lawyer, and politician
- Nicholas "Nick" Becker (born 2006), American baseball player
- Nicholas Bell, English actor
- Nicholas Benavides (born 2001), Hong Kong soccer player
- Nicholas Bennett (disambiguation), several people
- Nicholas Benois (1813–1898), Russian architect
- Nicholas F. Benton (born 1944), American publisher
- Nicholas Berliner, American diplomat
- Nicholas Bett (1992–2018), Kenyan hurdler
- Nicholas Kiptanui Bett (born 1996), Kenyan steeplechase runner
- Nicholas Biddle (1786–1844), American financier and the last president of the Second Bank of the United States
- Nicholas Bignall (born 1990), English soccer player
- Nicholas Bilokapic (born 2002), Australian soccer player
- Nicholas Binge (born 1990), Singaporean–born British author
- Nicholas Bingham (born 1945), English mathematician
- Nicholas Biwott (1940–2017), Kenyan businessman, philanthropist, and politician
- Nicholas Blain, Australian economist
- Nicholas Blake (disambiguation), several people
- Nicholas Blechman, American illustrator and graphic designer
- Nicholas Blincoe (born 1965), English author, critic, and screenwriter
- Nicholas Blomley (born 1962), English–Canadian professor and legal geographer
- Nicholas Bloom (born 1973), British–American economist and professor
- Nicholas Bodman (1913–1997), American linguist
- Nicholas Bonneville (1760–1828), French bookseller, journalist, printer, and writer
- Nicholas Bonsor (1942–2023), English politician
- Nicholas Bosanquet (1942–2026), British health economist
- Nicholas Bowling, British speculative fiction author
- Nicholas Boyle (born 1946), English academic and literary critic
- Nicholas Bradanovich (1907–1961), New Zealand rugby union player
- Nicholas F. Brady (born 1930), American banker and politician
- Nicholas Braun (born 1988), American actor
- Nicholas Brendon (born 1971), American actor and writer
- Nicholas Breton (c. 1545/53 – c. 1625/6), poet and prose writer of the English Renaissance
- Nicholas Briggs (born 1961), English actor, composer, director, and writer
- Nicholas Briot (1579–1646), medallist, coin engraver, and mechanical engineer
- Nicholas Britell (born 1980), American actor
- Nicholas Brodszky (1905–1958), Russian–Ukrainian composer
- Nicholas Brooks, several people
- Nicholas Brown, several people
- Nicholas Bruckman, English–American documentarian
- Nicholas Bubwith (1355-1424), English Bishop
- Nicholas Buckland (born 1989), English ice dancer
- Nicholas Budgen (1937–1998), English politician
- Nicholas Budgeon (born 1987), Australian field hockey player
- Nicholas Bullen (born 1968), English musician
- Nicholas Bullingham (c. 1520–1576), English cleric and bishop
- Nicholas Bundock (born 1973), Scottish Anglican bishop
- Nicholas Burns, several people
- Nicholas Burtner, American permaculturist
- Nicholas Calabrese (1942–2023), American mob hitman
- Nicholas Callan 1799–1864) ,Irish physicist and Catholic priest
- Nicholas J. Calogero (1924–2004), American politician
- Nicholas Campbell (born 1952), Canadian actor and filmmaker
- Nicholas Campion (born 1953), English astrologer and author
- Nicholas Canellakis (born 1984), American cellist
- Nicholas Canny (born 1944), Irish academic and historian
- Nicholas Carew, several people
- Nicholas Cartmell, Canadian politician
- Nicholas Cartwright, Australian actor
- Nicholas Cavaliere (1899–1995), American cinematographer
- Nicholas J. Celebrezze (born 1977), American politician and lawyer
- Nicholas Chabraja (born 1942), Serbian–American lawyer
- Nicholas Chalmers (born 1977), English conductor
- Nicholas Chamberlain (born 1963), English Anglican bishop
- Nicholas Chamberlaine (1632 – 1715), a priest in the Church of England
- Nicholas Charnetsky (1884–1959), Ukrainian Catholic bishop
- Nicholas Chase (born 1966), American composer
- Nicholas Chelimo (born 1983), Kenyan long-distance runner
- Nicholas Chiaravalloti, American politician
- Nicholas F. Chilton, Australian chemist and professor
- Nicholas Choi (born 1993), Hong Kong foil fencer
- Nicholas Christakis (born 1962), American physician and sociologist
- Nicholas Christenfeld, American professor and psychologist
- Nicholas Christofilos (1916–1972), Greek physicist
- Nicholas Ciarelli (born 1986), American journalist
- Nicholas J. Cifarelli (1928–2005), Italian–American physician
- Nicholas Cirillo (born 1997), American actor and producer
- Nicholas Civella (1912–1983), American mobster
- Nicholas Clack (born 1930), English rower
- Nicholas Clagett (1686–1746), English bishop
- Nicholas Clapp (born 1936), American filmmaker, writer, and amateur archaeologist
- Nicholas Clapton (born 1955), English author, countertenor, and singing teacher
- Nicholas Clavin (born 1948), Irish soccer player
- Nicholas Cleaver (born 1975), Australian freestyle skier
- Nicholas Clemente (1929–2009), attorney, judge, novelist, and professor
- Nicholas Cleobury (born 1950), English conductor
- Nicholas Clinch (1930–2016), author, environmentalist, lawyer, and mountaineer
- Nicholas Colasanto (1924–1985), American actor and director
- Nicholas Coleridge (born 1957), English author, cultural chair, and media executive
- Nicholas Colla (born 1986), Australian actor and filmmaker
- Nicholas Collon (born 1983), British conductor
- Nicholas Comper (1897–1939), English aviator and aircraft designer
- Nicholas Conard (born 1961), American–German archaeologist and prehistorian
- Nicholas Condy (1793–1857), English painter
- Nicholas Confessore (born 1976), American political correspondent
- Nicholas Congiato (1816–1897), Italian Jesuit priest
- Nicholas Connor (born 1999), English filmmaker
- Nicholas Conroy (1816–1879), Irish–born Canadian farmer and politician
- Nicholas Contreraz (1982–1998), American torture victim
- Nicholas Copeman (1906–1969), English Navy officer
- Nicholas Corozzo (born 1940), American mobster
- Nicholas Cosmo (born 1971), American businessman and white-collar criminal
- Nicholas Cottam (born 1951), British military officer
- Nicholas Courtney (1929–2011), Egyptian–born English actor
- Nicholas Cowdery (born 1946), Australian barrister
- Nicholas Cowell (born 1961), is a British property developer/investor
- Nicholas Cradock (born 2005), Australian actor
- Nicholas Crafts (1949–2023), British economist
- Nicholas Crane (born 1954), English broadcaster, explorer, geographer, and writer
- Nicholas Craven, Canadian record producer
- Nicholas Creed (born 1980), English cricketer
- Nicholas Cresswell (1750–1804), English diarist and explorer
- Nicholas Culpeper (1616 – 1654), English botanist, herbalist, physician and astrologer
- Nicholas Cummings (1924–2020), American author and psychologist
- Nicholas Cummins (born 1973), Australian cricket administrator
- Nicholas D'Agosto (born 1980), American actor
- Nicholas Daniloff (1934–2024), French–born American journalist
- Nicholas Danby (1935–1997), British organist, recitalist, and teacher
- Nicholas Dante (1941–1991), American dancer and writer
- Nicholas Davey (born 1950), British philosopher and professor
- Nicholas David, American soul singer-songwriter
- Nicholas Davies, several people
- Nicholas Dawidoff (born 1962), American writer
- Nicholas Delbanco (born 1942), American writer
- Nicholas Delpopolo (born 1989), American judoka
- Nicholas Denton, Australian actor and writer
- Nicholas Devlin (born 1971), Canadian judge
- Nicholas Dillon (born 1997), Trinidadian soccer player
- Nicholas Dimbleby (1946–2024), English sculptor
- Nicholas Dirks, American academic
- Nicholas Dopuch (1929–2018), American educator and accounting researcher
- Nicholas Doumanis (born 1964), Australian historian
- Nicholas Downs (born 1976), American actor
- Nicholas Dozenberg (1882–1954), Latvian–born American communist
- Nicholas Dromgoole (1927–2023), Brazilian–born English ballet critic
- Nicholas Duarte (born 2003), Australian soccer player
- Nicholas Dukagjini, 15th-century member of the Dukagjini family
- Nicholas Duncan-Williams (born 1957), Ghanaian preacher and religious leader
- Nicholas Eadie (1958–2025), Australian television, film and theatre actor
- Nicholas Eberstadt (born 1955), American political economist
- Nicholas Elko (1909–1991), American Ruthenian Greek Catholic and bishop
- Nicholas Evans (1950–2022), British journalist, screenwriter, television and film producer, and novelist
- Nicholas Fairall (born 1989), American ski jumper
- Nicholas Fairbairn (1933–1995), Scottish advocate and politician
- Nicholas Falcone (1892–1981), Italian–American composer, conductor, educator, and marching band director
- Nicholas Farnham (died 1257), Bishop of Durham, England
- Nicholas Farrell (born 1955), English actor
- Nicholas Fattoush (born 1943), Lebanese politician
- Nicholas Fekete (born 1962), Canadian modern pentathlete
- Nicholas Felix (1804–1876), English amateur "gentleman" cricketer, classical scholar, musician, linguist, inventor, writer and artist
- Nicholas Fenn (1936–2016), British diplomat
- Nicholas Fernandes (born 1992), Indian soccer player
- Nicholas Fernandez (born 1990), Australian figure skater
- Nicholas Fernando (1932–2020), Sri Lankan Catholic archbishop
- Nicholas Fernicola (1903–1982), American politician
- Nicholas Ferraby (born 1983), English cricketer
- Nicholas Ferrar (1592–1637), English scholar, courtier and businessman, who was ordained a deacon in the Church of England
- Nicholas Ferraro (1928–1984), American lawyer and politician
- Nicholas Field (born 1948), British actor
- Nicholas Fish (1758–1833), American Revolutionary War soldier
- Nicholas Fitzherbert (1550–1612), English secretary
- Nicholas Fitzsimon (1807–2849), Irish politician
- Nicholas Fletcher (born 1954), American football player and coach
- Nicholas Folker (born 1976), South African swimmer
- Nicholas Folland (born 1967), Australian artist and educator
- Nicholas Ford (1833–1897), American politician
- Nicholas Forell (1923–1998), German structural engineer
- Nicholas Forwood (born 1948), British barrister and judge
- Nicholas Foulkes, English author, historian, and journalist
- Nicholas Frankau (born 1954), English actor
- Nicholas Frankl (born 1971), Hungarian–English bobsledder
- Nicholas Franks (born 1949), Professor of Biophysics and Anaesthetics
- Nicholas Fraser (born 1956), British palaeontologist, academic, and museum curator
- Nicholas Frayling (born 1944), English Anglican priest
- Nicholas Freeston (1907–1978), English poet
- Nicholas Fung (born 1990), Malaysian golfer
- Nicholas Galitzine (born 1994), English actor
- Nicholas Garaufis (born 1948), senior United States district judge
- Nicholas Gassaway (baptized 1634 – 1691), colonial military and political leader and justice in early Maryland
- Nicholas Gillett, several people
- Nicholas Gillham (1932–2018), American geneticist
- Nicholas Gilman (1755–1814), American Founding Father
- Nicholas Gleaves (born 1969), English actor and playwright
- Nicholas Gonzalez (born 1976), American actor
- Nicholas Goodrick-Clarke (1953–2012), English historian and professor
- Nicholas Greenberry (circa 1627 – 1697), 4th Royal Governor of Maryland
- Nicholas Grimald (1519–1562), English poet and dramatist
- Nicholas Grimshaw (1939–2025), English architect
- Nicholas Guest (born 1951), American actor
- Nicholas Halliday (born 1999), Hong Kong sailor
- Nicholas Hammond (disambiguation), several people
- Nicholas Hasluck (born 1942), Australian novelist, poet, short story writer, and former judge
- Nicholas Heath (c. 1501–1578), last Roman Catholic archbishop of York and Lord Chancellor
- Nicholas Henshall (born 1962), British Anglican priest and author
- Nicholas Higham (1961–2024), British numerical analyst
- Nicholas Hilliard (c. 1547 – 1619), English goldsmith and limner
- Nicholas Hoult (born 1989), English actor
- Nicholas Hughes (1962–2009), British and American fisheries biologist
- Nicholas Hytner (born 1956), English director and producer
- Nicholas Ifill (born 1968), Barbadian-born Canadian cricketer
- Nicholas Ingolia (born 1979), American molecular biologist and professor
- Nicholas Irving (born 1986), American author and former soldier
- Nicholas Isherwood, Franco-American bass singer
- Nicholas Jackson, several people
- Nicholas Jones, several people
- Nicholas Kaldor (1908–1986), Hungarian-born British economist
- Nicholas Kalogeropoulos (born 1945), Greek tennis player
- Nicholas Kasirer, Canadian jurist who is serving as a puisne justice of the Supreme Court of Canada
- Nicholas Katzenbach (1922–2012), American lawyer who served as United States Attorney General
- Nicholas Kay (born 1958), British diplomat
- Nicholas Kazan (born 1945), American filmmaker
- Nicholas Kemeys(before 1593 – 1648), Welsh landowner and soldier
- Nicholas Kettle (born 1990), American politician
- Nicholas Kratzer (1487? – 1550), German mathematician, astronomer, and horologist
- Nicholas Kristof (born 1959), American journalist and political commentator
- Nicholas Lane (c. 1585-1644), English surveyor and cartographer
- Nicholas Lanier (baptised 1588 – buried 1666), English composer and musician
- Nicholas LaRoche (born 1983), American figure skater
- Nicholas Lash (1934–2020), English Catholic theologian
- Nicholas Latifi (born 1995), Canadian racing driver
- Nicholas Laucella (1882–1952), American composer and flautist
- Nicholas Laughlin (born 1975), Trinidadian editor and writer
- Nicholas Lavender (born 1964), English judge
- Nicholas Lavery (born 1998), Australian rower
- Nicholas Lawes (c. 1652 – 1731) , British judge and colonial administrator
- Nicholas Lea (born 1962), Canadian actor
- Nicholas Legeros (born 1955), American bronze sculptor
- Nicholas Lemann, American academic and writer
- Nicholas Lens (born 1957), Belgian composer of contemporary music
- Nicholas Lezard, English author, journalist, and literary critic
- Nicholas Lindheim (born 1984), American golfer
- Nicholas Livas (born 1987), Greek–American basketball player
- Nicholas Lloyd (born 1942), British former newspaper editor and broadcaster
- Nicholas Loftin, American record producer
- Nicholas Logsdail (born 1945), English art dealer
- Nicholas Loney (1826–1869), English businessman
- Nicholas Long (born 1989), American racing cyclist
- Nicholas Longworth (1869–1931), American lawyer and politician
- Nicholas Luard (1937–2004), British politician and writer
- Nicholas Lydon (born 1957), British biochemist, entrepreneur, and scientist
- Nicholas Lyell (1938–2010), English politician
- Nicholas Lyndhurst (born 1961), English actor
- Nicholas Mangione (1935–2008), American real estate developer
- Nicholas Mavroules (1929–2003), American politician from Massachusetts
- Nicholas McDonald (born 1996), Scottish singer and songwriter
- Nicholas Megura (1920–1988), American fighter pilot
- Nicholas Metropolis (1915–1999), Greek-American physicist
- Nicholas Mevoli (1981–2013), American freediver
- Nicholas Michalski (born 2007), English footballer
- Nicholas Mitchell, several people
- Nicholas Monroe (born 1982), American tennis player
- Nicholas Monsarrat (1910–1979), British novelist
- Nicholas Morello (1890–1916), one of the first Italian-American organized crime figures in New York City
- Nicholas Morrow (born 1995), American football player
- Nicholas Mosley (1923–2017), English aristocrat, biographer, and novelist
- Nicholas Murray, several people
- Nicholas Nayfack (1909–1958), American film producer
- Nicholas Negroponte (born 1943), Greek–American architect and computer scientist
- Nicholas Nicastro (born 1963), American filmmaker, writer, and film critic
- Nicholas Nikolayevich, several people
- Nicholas Nixon (born 1947), American photographer
- Nicholas Nugent (c. 1525–1582), Anglo-Irish judge
- Nicholas O'Connor (born 1945), Irish politician
- Nicholas R. O'Connor (1849–1920), American politician from New York
- Nicholas Orme (born 1942), British historian
- Nicholas Orsini, Greek–Italian nobleman
- Nicholas Owen, several people
- Nicholas Parsons (1923–2020), English actor, straight man and radio and television presenter
- Nicholas Patrick (born 1964), English–American astronaut and engineer
- Nicholas Paul (born 1998), Trinidadian track cyclist
- Nicholas Payton (born 1973), American trumpet player and multi-instrumentalist
- Nicholas Pegg, English actor, director, and writer
- Nicholas Pelham (1650–1739), a British politician
- Nicholas Penny (born 1949), British art historian
- Nicholas Petit-Frere (born 1999), American football player
- Nicholas Pettas (born 1973), Greek–Danish mixed martial artist
- Nicholas Pierini (born 1998), Italian soccer player
- Nicholas Pileggi (born 1933), American author and screenwriter
- Nicholas Pinnock (born 1973), English actor
- Nicholas Platt (born 1946), American diplomat
- Nicholas Podany, American actor
- Nicholas Pooran (born 1995), Trinidadian cricketer
- Nicholas Poyntz (1510—circa 1556), was a prominent English courtier
- Nicholas Pryor (1935–2024), American actor
- Nicholas Pumfrey (1951–2007), a British barrister who served as a High Court judge
- Nicholas Quinn (born 1993), Irish swimmer
- Nicholas Ray (1911–1979), American film director, screenwriter, and actor
- Nicholas Reade (born 1946), British Anglican bishop
- Nicholas Rescher (1928–1924), German–born American author, philosopher, and polymath
- Nicholas Rodriguez (born 2005), American football player
- Nicholas Roerich (1874–1947), Russian polymath
- Nicholas Romanov, several people
- Nicholas Roosevelt, several people
- Nicholas Rowe, several people
- Nicholas Russo (1845–1902), Italian Catholic priest, Jesuit, missionary, and philosopher
- Nicholas Sacco (born 1946), American politician
- Nicholas Samartis, Australian artist, photographer, and sculptor
- Nicholas Santora (1942–2018), American mobster
- Nicholas Santos (born 1980), Brazilian swimmer
- Nicholas Saputra (born 1984), Indonesian actor and film producer
- Nicholas Scutari (born 1968), American politician and attorney
- Nicholas Serota (born 1946), British art historian and curator
- Nicholas Sheehy (1728–1766), Irish Catholic priest
- Nicholas Singleton (born 2004), American football player
- Nicholas Smith, several people
- Nicholas Soames (born 1948), English politician
- Nicholas Sparks (politician) (1794–1862), American politician
- Nicholas Sparks (born 1965), American novelist and screenwriter
- Nicholas Stadlen (1950–2023), British judge
- Nicholas Stoller (born 1976), English–born American filmmaker
- Nicholas Tarling (1931–2017), New Zealand academic, author, and historian
- Nicholas Taylor, several people
- Nicholas Teo (born 1981), Malaysian–Chinese singer
- Nicholas Thomas, several people
- Nicholas Thorburn (born 1981), Canadian musician
- Nicholas Treadwell (born 1937), English gallerist
- Nicholas Trist (1800–1874), American lawyer, diplomat, planter, and businessman
- Nicholas Tritton (born 1984), judoka
- Nicholas Tse (born 1980), Hong Kong actor, entrepreneur, singer, songwriter, and martial artist
- Nicholas Turturro (born 1962), American actor
- Nicholas Ugbane (born 1953), Nigerian banker and politician
- Nicholas Underhill (born 1952), British judge
- Nicholas Upsall (c. 1596 – 1666), early Puritan settler
- Nicholas Urie (born 1985), American composer of jazz and classical music
- Nicholas Varopoulos (born 1940), Greek mathematician
- Nicholas Vince (born 1958), actor, writer, and film maker
- Nicholas Vines (born 1976), Australian composer
- Nicholas Vreeland, Tibetan Buddhist monk
- Nicholas Wade (born 1942), British author and journalist
- Nicholas Walsh, several people
- Nicholas Walters (born 1986), Jamaican boxer
- Nicholas Ward, several people
- Nicholas West (1461—1533), English bishop and diplomatist
- Nicholas White, several people
- Nicholas Wilder (1937–1989), American art dealer
- Nicholas Williams, several people
- Nicholas Wilson, several people
- Nicholas James Wilton (born 1978), former English cricketer
- Nicholas Winmar (born 1991), Australian rules footballer
- Nicholas Winterton (born 1938), British politician
- Nicholas Winton (1909–2015), English humanitarian and stockbroker
- Nicholas Wiseman (1802–1865), English Roman Catholic prelate
- Nicholas Witchell (born 1953), English journalist and news presenter
- Nicholas Wolterstorff (born 1932), American philosopher and theologian
- Nicholas Wood (1795–1865), English colliery and steam locomotive engineer
- Nicholas Wootton, American television writer and producer
- Nicholas Worth (1937–2007), American actor
- Nicholas Wotton (c. 1497 – 1567), English diplomat, cleric and courtier
- Nicholas Wrigley (born 1955), British merchant banker
- Nicholas Wright, several people
- Nicholas Yang (born 1955), Taiwanese-born Hong Kong politician and engineer
- Nicholas Yarushevich (1892–1961), the Metropolitan of Kiev
- Nicholas Yonge (c. 1560 – 1619), English singer and publisher
- Nicholas Young, several people
- Nicholas Zorzi, several people

=== Nobility ===
- Nicholas I of Russia (1796–1855), Emperor of Russia
- Nicholas II of Russia (1868–1918), Emperor of Russia
- Prince Nicholas of Greece and Denmark, son of George I of Greece

=== Saints ===
- Nicholas of Myra
- Nicholas of Trani

==== Catholic ====
- Nicholas The Duc Bui
- Nicholas of Flüe
- Nicholas of Tolentino

==== Eastern Orthodox ====
- Nicholas of Japan
- Nicholas Kabasilas
- Nicholas of Lesvos
- Nicholas of Ohrid and Žiča
- Nicholas II of Russia
- Nicholas Salos of Pskov

=== Surname ===
- Barry Nicholas (1919–2002), British legal scholar
- Bob Nicholas (born 1957), American politician
- Cindy Nicholas (1957–2016), Canadian long-distance swimmer
- Cyril Nicholas (1898–1961), Sri Lankan Burgher army captain, civil servant, and forester
- Edward Nicholas (1593–1699), English politician
- Fred Nicholas (1893–1962), British cricketer
- George Nicholas (politician) (1754–1799), American law professor, son of Robert C. Nicholas Sr.
- George Nicholas (footballer) (born 1992)
- Harry Nicholas (1905–1997), British trade unionist
- Joirdon Nicholas (born 1999), American-Jamaican basketball player
- John Nicholas (academic), 17th-century Oxford administrator
- John Nicholas (congressman) (1764–1819), American lawyer and politician, father of Robert C. Nicholas
- John Nicholas (judge), Australian judge
- John Nicholas (of Chepstow), 17th-century English politician
- John Spangler Nicholas (1895–1963), American embryologist
- Nick St. Nicholas (born 1943), musician
- Paul Nicholas (born 1944), English actor and singer
- Phil Nicholas (born 1955), American politician
- Philip Nicholas (1876–1952), Welsh rugby player
- Robert C. Nicholas (New York politician) (1801–1851), American politician
- Robert Carter Nicholas, Sr. (1728–1780), American lawyer and politician
- Robert Carter Nicholas (1793–1857), American planter and politician
- Samuel Nicholas (1744–1790), the first American Marine officer and commandant
- Sandra Lovelace Nicholas (born 1948), Canadian indigenous activist and senator
- Thomas Nicholas (disambiguation), several people
- Tom Nicholas, British economist
- Victor A. Nicholas (1897–1956), second Sri Lankan to hold post of Postmaster General of Sri Lanka
- William H. Nicholas (1892–1984), American politician
- William Nicholas (officer) (1785–1812), British Army officer
- Wilson Cary Nicholas (1761–1820), American banker and politician
- The Nicholas Brothers, American tap dancers:
  - Fayard Nicholas (1914–2006)
  - Harold Nicholas (1921–2000)

== See also ==
- Nick (short form)
- Nicky, Nickey, Nicki, Niky, Nikky (nicknames)
- Nicholaus
