= Mikołajczak =

Mikolajczak or Mikołajczak is a Polish surname derived from the name Mikołaj (Nicholas). Notable people with the surname include:

- Aleksander Mikołajczak (born 1953), Polish actor
- Celina Mikolajczak, American battery engineer and amateur astronomer
- Christian Mikolajczak (born 1981), German footballer
- Detlef Mikolajczak (born 1964), German footballer
- Izabella Miko (born 1981 as Izabella Anna Mikołajczak), Polish actress
- Jan Mikołajczak (1907–2002) was a Polish rower, Olympic medalist
- Krzysztof Mikołajczak (born 1984), Polish fencer
- Martyna Mikołajczak (born 1991), Polish rower
- Tomasz Mikołajczak (born 1987), Polish footballer

== See also ==
- Mikołajczyk
