= 1792 in France =

- Decades: 1770s; 1780s; 1790s; 1800s; 1810s
- See also: History of France; Timeline of French history; List of years in France

Events from the year 1792 in France.

== Incumbents ==
- Monarch: Louis XVI (until 21 September; monarchy abolished)
- The Legislative Assembly (until 21 September)
- The National Convention (from 21 September)

== Events ==
=== March ===
- 25 March – The Legislative Assembly agrees that the guillotine should be used for judicial executions.

=== April ===
- 20 April – The Legislative Assembly declares war against Austria, starting the French Revolutionary Wars and War of the First Coalition.
- 25 April
  - Highwayman Nicolas Pelletier becomes the first person executed by guillotine in France, in what becomes the Place de l'Hôtel de Ville in Paris.
  - La Marseillaise, the French national anthem, is composed by Claude Joseph Rouget de Lisle in Strasbourg.

=== June ===
- 13 June – Prussia declares war against France.
- 20 June – Demonstration of 20 June 1792.

=== August ===
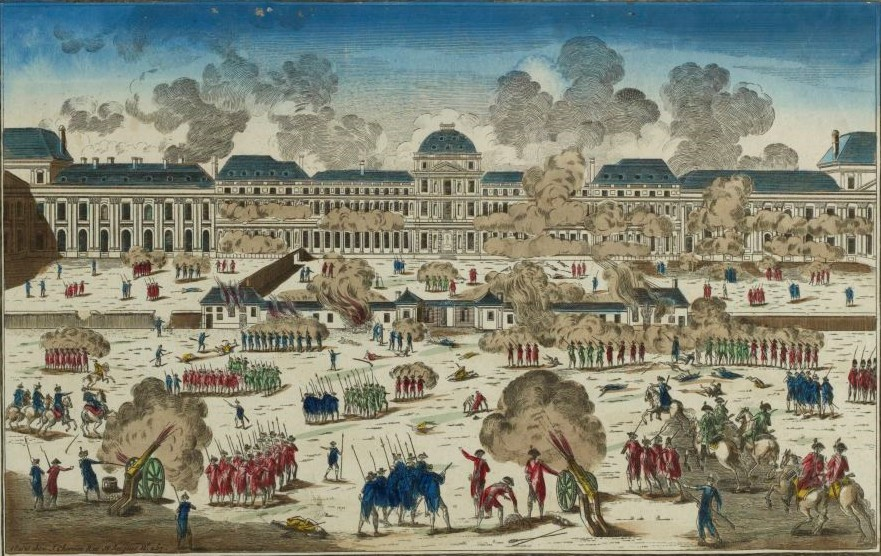
10 August: Storming of the Tuileries (Musée de la Révolution française)

- 10 August – French Revolution: Insurrection of 10 August 1792 – The Tuileries Palace is stormed and Louis XVI is arrested and taken into custody.
- 20 August – War of the First Coalition: Battle of Verdun – Prussia defeats France, opening a route to Paris.
- 21 August – Royalist Louis Collenot d'Angremont becomes the first person executed by guillotine for political reasons, in the Place du Carrousel in Paris.

=== September ===
- 2–19 September – 1792 French National Convention election.
- 2–7 September – French Revolution: September Massacres – Rampaging mobs in Paris slaughter three Roman Catholic bishops and more than 200 priests, together with at least 1,000 criminals.
- 9 September – 9 September massacres at Versailles.
- 11 September – Six men steal some of the former French Crown Jewels from a warehouse, where the revolutionary government has stored them.
- 14 September – Radical antimonarchist Thomas Paine flees from England to France, after being indicted for treason. He is tried in absentia during December and outlawed.
- 20 September – French Revolutionary Wars: Battle of Valmy – The French revolutionary army defeats the Prussians under the Duke of Brunswick after a 7-hour artillery duel.

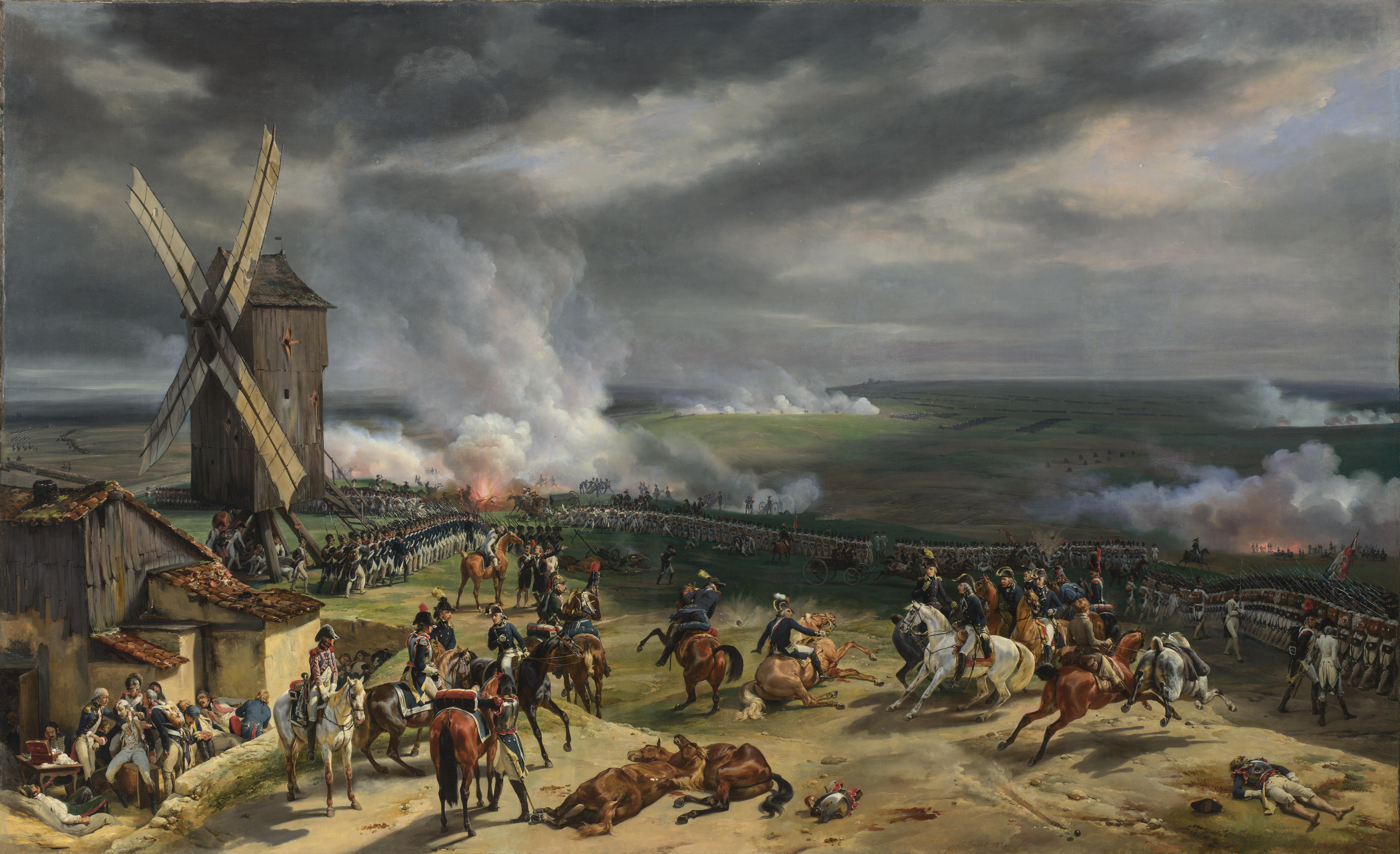
20 September: Battle of Valmy

- 21 September – French Revolution: A Proclamation of the abolition of the monarchy by the French Convention goes into effect, and the French First Republic is established, effective the following day.
- 22 September – French Revolution: The Era of the historical French Republican Calendar begins.

=== November ===
- 6 November – War of the First Coalition: Battle of Jemappes – Austrian armies under the command of Duke Albert of Saxe-Teschen are defeated in Belgium (at this time part of the Austrian Netherlands) by the French Army led by General Charles François Dumouriez.
- 19 November – The National Convention passes a resolution pledging French support for the overthrow of the governments of other nations.

=== December ===
- 26 December – The trial of Louis XVI begins.

=== Ongoing ===
- French Revolution
- French Revolutionary Wars
- War of the First Coalition

=== Full date unknown ===
- Claude Chappe successfully demonstrates the first semaphore line, between Paris and Lille.
- Barthélemy Catherine Joubert, future general, becomes sub-lieutenant.

== Births ==
- 21 May – Gaspard-Gustave Coriolis, engineer, scientist
- 1 August – Pierre Solomon Ségalas d'Etchépare, physician
- 9 August – Charles-François Lebœuf, sculptor
- 25 August – Jean-Baptiste Duvergier, lawyer
- 28 November – Victor Cousin, philosopher

== Deaths ==
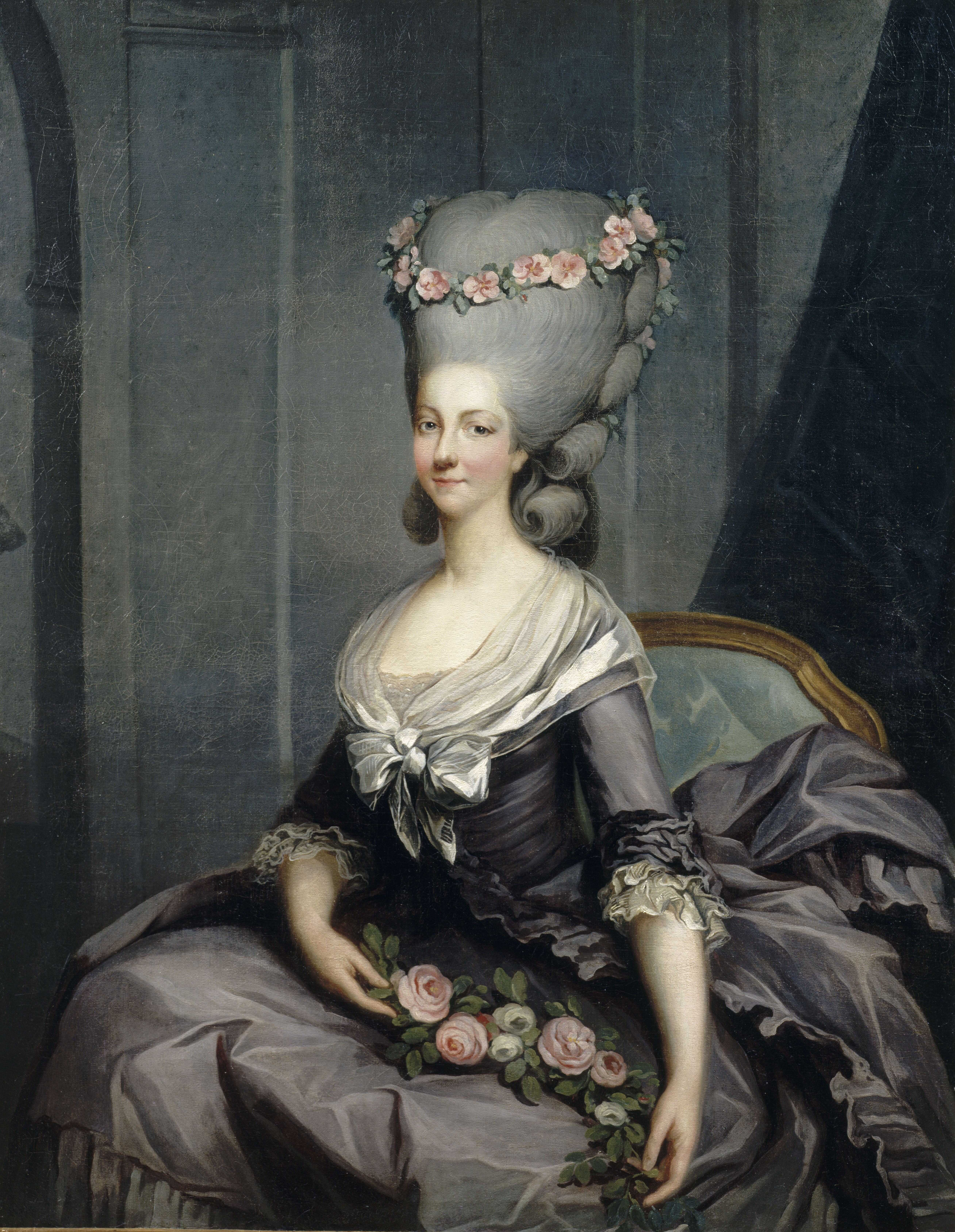
Marie Thérèse Louise of Savoy, Princesse de Lamballe

- 1 March – Jean Godin des Odonais, cartographer and naturalist
- 12 May – Charles Simon Favart, dramatist
- 29 July – René Nicolas Charles Augustin de Maupeou, Chancellor of France
- 21 August – Louis Collenot d'Angremont, counter-revolutionary (guillotined)
- 23 August – Arnaud II de La Porte, statesman (executed)
- 25 August – Jacques Cazotte, writer (executed)
- 3 September
  - Karl Josef von Bachmann, Swiss Guards commander (guillotined)
  - Marie Thérèse Louise of Savoy, Princesse de Lamballe, princess, courtier to Marie Antoinette (killed in September Massacres)
- 9 September
  - Louis Hercule Timoléon de Cossé, 8th Duke of Brissac, military commander (killed in September Massacres)
  - Claude Antoine de Valdec de Lessart, politician
  - Charles d'Abancourt, minister (killed in September Massacres)
- 22 October – Guillaume Le Gentil, astronomer
- 7 December – Marie Jeanne Riccoboni, novelist
- Full date unknown – Nicholas Adam, grammarian
