= Nikola =

- Pronunciation: Serbo-Croatian: [nǐkola]
- Gender: masculine (predominantly) and feminine
- Language: Slavic
- Name day: 6 December [O.S. 19 December]

Origin
- Language: Greek
- Meaning: victory of the people
- Region of origin: Eastern Europe

Other names
- Alternative spelling: Cyrillic: Никола
- Nicknames: Niko, Nikolica, Nidžo, Nikolče, Nikša, Nikica, Nikulitsa, Nino, Kole, Kolyo, Kolyu
- Derived: Nikolaos
- Related names: Miklos, Mikołaj, Mikuláš, Nicholas, Nicola, Nicolas, Nikolaos, Nicolau, Nicolay, Niccolò, Nikolay, Nikolaj, Nick, Nico, Nicolina, Nicole
- Popularity: see popular names

Nikola (Cyrillic: Никола) is a given name which, like Nicholas, is a version of the Greek Nikolaos (Νικόλαος) and it means "the winner of the people". It is common as a masculine given name in the South Slavic countries (Bosnia and Herzegovina, Bulgaria, Croatia, North Macedonia, Montenegro, Serbia, Slovenia), while in West Slavic countries (Czech Republic, Poland, Slovakia) it is primarily found as a feminine given name. There is a wide variety of male diminutives of the name, examples including: Niko, Nikolica, Nidžo, Nikolče, Nikša, Nikica, Nikulitsa, Nino, Kole, Kolja, Kolyo, and Kolyu.

The spelling with a K, Nikola, usually indicates Slavic origin, while Nicola usually indicates Italian origin.

== Statistics ==
- Serbia: male name. 5th most popular in 2011, 1st in 2001, 1st in 1991, 5th in 1981, 9th pre-1940.
- Croatia: male name. 32,304 (2011), 26,986 (2021)
- Bosnia and Herzegovina: male name.
- Bulgaria: male name.
- North Macedonia: male name.
- Czech Republic: 22,567 females and 740 males (2002).
- Poland: female name.
- Slovakia: female name.
- Slovenia: male name. 2003 males and female name (form of name).

== People with the name ==
=== Arts ===
- Nikola Avramov, Bulgarian painter
- Nikola Hajdin, President of Serbian Academy of Sciences and Arts
- Nikola Đuričko, Serbian actor
- Nikola Kastner (born 1983), German actress
- Nikola Kojo, Serbian actor
- Nikola Martinovski, Macedonian painter
- Nikola Nešković, Serbian painter
- Nikola Vaptsarov, Bulgarian poet

=== Music ===
- Nikola Mijailović (singer), Serbian opera singer
- Nikola Resanovic, Serbian-American composer
- Nikola Šarčević, Swedish thrash rock musician
- Nikola Kołodziejczyk, Polish jazz pianist, composer and arranger
- Nikola Petrović, Serbian metal bassist

=== Politics ===
- Vlgdrag or monk Nikola (d. 1327), Serbian nobleman
- Nikola Altomanović (fl. 1371–73), Serbian prince
- Nikola Skobaljić (fl. 1454), Serbian general
- Nikola Frankopan, Croatian ban
- Nikola IV Zrinski, Croatian-Hungarian ban and hero of Siege of Szigetvár
- Nicholas I of Montenegro, King of Montenegro
- Prince Nikola of Yugoslavia (1928–1954), Serbian prince
- Nikola, Crown Prince of Montenegro (born 1944), Montenegrin prince
- Nikola Bokan (born 1999), Serbian politician
- Nikola Gruevski, Macedonian Prime minister
- Nikola Jorgic, Bosnian Serb soldier
- Nikola Karev, Bulgarian revolutionary
- Nikola Kavaja, Serbian anti-communists
- Nikola Kljusev, Macedonian politician
- Nikola Ljubičić, Serbian politician
- Nikola Mandić, Croatian politician
- Nikola Milošević (politician), Serbian intellectual
- Nikola Mushanov, Bulgarian politician
- Nikola Pašić, Serbian politician and diplomat
- Nikola Petkov, Bulgarian politician
- Nikola Šećeroski, Serbian politician
- Nikola Špirić, Bosnian Serb politician
- Nikola Uzunović, Serbian politician
- Nikola Vitov Gučetić, Ragusian statesman
- Nikola Zhekov, Bulgarian military

=== Science ===
- Nikola Moravčević, Serbian academic
- Nikola Obreshkov, Bulgarian mathematician
- Nikola Tesla, Serbian-American inventor and mechanical engineer
- Nikola Moushmov, Bulgarian historian

=== Sports ===
- Nikola Brejchová, Czech athlete
- Nikola Dragović, Serbian basketball player
- Nikola Grbić, Serbian volleyball player
- Nikola Jakšić, Serbian water polo player, Olympic champion
- Nikola Jerkan, Croatian footballer
- Nikola Jokić, Serbian basketball player
- Nikola Jovanović, Montenegrin footballer
- Nikola Jović, Serbian basketball player
- Nikola Jovović, Serbian volleyball player
- Nikola Jurčević, Croatian footballer
- Nikola Kalinić, Serbian basketball player
- Nikola Karabatić, French team handball player
- Nikola Katić, Croatian football player
- Nikola Kotkov, Bulgarian footballer
- Nikola Kovachev, Bulgarian footballer
- Nikola Kovačević (volleyball), Serbian volleyball player
- Niko Kranjčar, Croatian footballer
- Nikola Kuljača, Serbian waterpolo goalkeeper
- Nikola Kusturica (born 2009), Serbian basketball player
- Nikola Lazetić, Serbian footballer
- Nikola Lončar, Serbian basketball player
- Nikola Lukić (water polo), Serbian water polo player
- Nikola Maraš, Serbian footballer
- Nikola Mijailović, Serbian footballer
- Nikola Milojević, Serbian football goalkeeper
- Nikola Milošević, Serbian football midfielder
- Nikola Mirotić, Spanish basketball player of Montenegrin descent
- Nikola Nikezić, Montenegrin footballer
- Nikola Nikić, Bosnian Serb footballer
- Nikola Nimac, Croatian racer
- Nikola Peković, Montenegrin basketball player
- Nikola Petroff, Bulgarian wrestler
- Nikola Pilić, Yugoslav Croat professional tennis player
- Nikola Pokrivač, Croatian footballer
- Nikola Rosić, Serbian volleyball player
- Nikola Rybanská (born 1995), Slovak footballer
- Nikola Soldo (born 2001), Croatian footballer
- Nikola Stojić (born 1974), Serbian rower
- Nikola Sudová (born 1982), Czech freestyle skier
- Nikola Tsolov (born 2006), Bulgarian racing driver
- Nikola Tunići (born 1984), German politician
- Nikola Vignjević, Serbian footballer
- Nikola Vlašić, Croatian footballer
- Nikola Vučević, Montenegrin basketball player
- Nikola Vujčić (born 1978), Croatian basketball player and team manager of Maccabi Tel Aviv
- Nikola Žigić, Serbian footballer

=== Other ===
- Nikola Modruški, Croatian catholic priest
- Nikola Radosavljević, Serbian mass murderer
- Nicholas Nikola Ribic, Serbian-Canadian convicted for hostage-taking
- List Nikola Stojanović (disambiguation), name shared by several individuals
- Nikola Janković, several people

=== Fictional characters ===
- Doctor Nikola, a supervillain in works of Guy Boothby

== See also ==
- Nicola (name)
- Nikolai (disambiguation)
- Nikolić, surname
- Nikolov
- Nikolovski
