= Clopton =

Clopton may refer to:

== People ==
- Clopton (name)

== Places ==
- Clopton, Cambridgeshire, a deserted medieval village
- Clopton, Northamptonshire, a small village and civil parish
- Clopton, Suffolk, a village
- Clopton, Alabama
- Clopton, Virginia (disambiguation), multiple locations
- Clopton Bridge, Stratford-upon-Avon, England
- Clopton House, near Stratford-upon-Avon, once owned by Hugh Clopton

== See also ==
- Clapton (disambiguation)
