= Nikkola =

Nikkola is a Finnish surname. Notable people with the surname include:

- Ari-Pekka Nikkola (born 1969), Finnish ski jumper
- Iisakki Nikkola (1887–1959), Finnish farmer and politician

== See also ==
- Nikola
