= Nikolas =

Nikolas is a given name and a surname. Notable people with the name include the following:

== Given name ==
=== Music ===
- Nikolas Asimos (1949–1988), Greek composer and singer
- Nikolas Caoile, American conductor
- Nikolas Metaxas (born 1988), American singer and songwriter
- Nikolas Papamitrou (born 1995), American hip hop record producer known by his stage name Papamitrou
- Nikolas Schreck, American singer/songwriter, musician, author, film-maker and Tantric Buddhist religious teacher
- Nikolas Sideris (born 1977), Greek composer
- Nikolas Kostantinos Venetoulis (1936–1998), American record producer known as Nick Venet

=== Sports ===
- Nikolas Asprogenous (born 1986), Cypriot footballer
- Nikolas Berger (born 1974), Austrian beach volleyball player
- Nikolas Besagno (born 1988), American soccer player
- Nikolas Gelavis (born 1929), Australian rules footballer known as Nick Gelavis
- Nikolas Ketner (born 1991), Czech ice hockey player
- Nikolas Khamenia (born 2006), American basketball player
- Nikolas Ledgerwood (born 1985), Canadian soccer player
- Nikolas Lewis (born 1982), American gridiron football player and coach known as Nik Lewis
- Nikolas Maes (born 1986), Belgian road bicycle racer
- Nikolas Matinpalo (born 1998), Finnish ice hockey player
- Nikolas Mattheou (born 1998), Cypriot footballer
- Nikolas Nartey (born 2000), Danish footballer
- Nikolas Nicolaou (born 1979), Cypriot football player
- Nikolas Panagiotou (born 2000), Cypriot footballer
- Nikolas Petrik (born 1984), Austrian ice hockey player
- Nikolas Proesmans (born 1992), Belgian footballer
- Nikolas Špalek (born 1997), Slovak footballer
- Nikolas Stauskas (born 1993), Canadian basketball player known as Nik Stauskas
- Nikolas Sylvester (born 2000), Vincentian swimmer
- Nikolas Tsattalios (born 1990), Australian footballer
- Nikolas Wallenda (born 1979), American acrobat known as Nik Wallenda
- Nikolas Walstad (born 1997), Norwegian footballer
- Nikolas Wamsteeker (born 1996), Canadian ice dancer

=== Other professions ===
- Nikolas Ferreira (born 1996), Brazilian politician
- Nikolas Gvosdev (born 1969), Russian international relations scholar
- Nikolas Kompridis (born 1953), Canadian philosopher and political theorist
- Nikolas Kozloff (born 1969), American author
- Nikolas Löbel (born 1986), German politician
- Nikolas Ormaetxea (1888–1961), Spanish writer
- Nikolas Papadopoulos (born 1973), Cypriot politician
- Nikolas Patsaouras (born 1943), American urban planner known as Nick Patsaouras
- Nikolas Rose (born 1947), British sociologist
- Nikolas Schiller (born 1980), American blogger
- Nikolas Sigurdsson Paus (mentioned 1329–1347), Norwegian nobleman
- Nikolas Tsakos (born 1963), Greek shipowner
- Nikolas Vogel (1967–1991), Austrian film actor
- Nikolas Weinstein (born 1968), American glass artist

=== Other ===
- Nikolas Cruz (born 1998), American mass murderer serving multiple life sentences

== Fictional characters ==
- Nikolas Cassadine, from American soap opera General Hospital

== Middle name ==
- Karl Nikolas Fraas (1810–1875), German botanist and agriculturist
- Olaf Nikolas Olsen (1794–1848), Danish military officer

== Surname ==
- Alexa Nikolas (born 1992), American actress

== See also ==
- Nicolas (disambiguation)
- Nickolas
- Niklas (name)
- Nikola
- Nikolai (disambiguation)
- Nikolaj
