= Clapton =

Clapton may refer to:

== People ==
- Clapton (surname)
- Eric Clapton (born 1945), English blues rock guitarist

== Places ==
- Clapton, London, an area in the London Borough of Hackney
- Clapton, Berkshire, a village in Berkshire
- Clapton, Gloucestershire, an English village
- Clapton, Somerset a hamlet in the parish of Ston Easton
- Clapton, South Somerset a hamlet in the parish of Wayford
- Clapton in Gordano, a village in Somerset, England
- 4305 Clapton, an asteroid named after Eric Clapton
- Clapton Stadium, a former greyhound stadium that existed between 1928 and 1974

== Music ==
- Multiple albums by blues rock musician Eric Clapton:
  - Clapton (1973 album), a greatest hits album from Polydor
  - Clapton (2010 album), a studio album

== Other ==
- Clapton F.C., an English association football club based in Forest Gate, in the London Borough of Newham, since 1877

== See also ==
- Clopton (disambiguation)
