= Mikołajczyk =

Mikołajczyk is a Polish surname derived from the name Mikołaj (Nicholas). Notable people with the surname include:

- Erwin Mikolajczyk (died 1994), perpetrator of the 1994 Euskirchen court shooting
- Helena Mikołajczyk (born 1968), Polish biathlete
- Ron Mikolajczyk (born 1950), American football player
- Stanisław Mikołajczyk (1901–1966), prime minister of the Polish government-in-exile during World War II

== See also ==
- Mikolajczak
