= Clopton, Virginia =

Clopton, Virginia may refer to:

- Clopton, Gloucester County, Virginia
- Clopton, Richmond County, Virginia
