= Nikša =

Nikša (Cyrillic: Никша) is a masculine given name, a Bosnian/Croatian/Serbian variant of Nikola (cognate to Nicholas).

Notable people with the name include:

- Nikša Bratoš (born 1959), Bosnian musician who gained fame in former Yugoslavia, member of bands Valentino and Crvena jabuka
- Nikša Dobud (born 1985), Croatian water polo player
- Nikša Gligo (1946–2024), Croatian musicologist and university professor
- Nikša Gradi or Nikola Gradić / Nicoló Gradi (1825–1894), Croatian writer, politician, and lawyer from Dubrovnik
- Nikša Kaleb (born 1973), Croatian handball player
- Nikša Petrović (born 1992), Croatian football player
- Nikša Ranjina or Nicola Ragnina (1494–1582), Croatian writer and noblemen from the Republic of Ragusa (modern-day Dubrovnik)
- Nikša Roki (born 1988), Croatian swimmer
- Nikša Skelin (born 1978), Croatian rower
- Nikša Sviličić (born 1970), Croatian scientist, writer, director and musician
