= Richard Carew =

Richard Carew may refer to:

- Richard Carew (antiquary) (1555–1620), English translator and antiquary
- Sir Richard Carew, 1st Baronet (c. 1580–1643), medical experimenter and educationist, son of the antiquary

== See also ==
- Sir Richard Carew Pole, 13th Baronet (1938–2024)
- Carew (surname)
