= Niek =

Niek is a Dutch masculine given name. It is a short form (usually a hypocorism) of Nicolaas, or sometimes of Nicasius or Dominic. People with the name include:

- Niek de graef
- Niek van Dijk (born 1951), Dutch orthopaedic surgeon
- Niek du Toit, South African arms dealer and mercenary
- Niek Engelschman (1913–1988), Dutch actor and WW II resistance fighter
- Niek Kemps (born 1952), Dutch visual artist
- Niek Kimmann (born 1996), Dutch BMX racing cyclist
- Niek Loohuis (born 1986), Dutch footballer
- Niek Michel (1912–1971), Dutch football goalkeeper
- Niek Neuwahl (born 1944), Dutch board game designer
- Niek te Veluwe (born 1993), Dutch footballer
- Niek Versteegen (born 1994), Dutch footballer
- Niek Vossebelt (born 1991), Dutch footballer

== See also ==
- Nick (given name)
