= William Carew =

William Carew may refer to:

- William Aquin Carew (1922–2012), Canadian bishop, Vatican diplomat
- Sir William Carew, 5th Baronet (1690–1744) of the Carew baronets, MP for Cornwall

== See also ==
- William Conolly-Carew, 6th Baron Carew
- William Carew Hazlitt
- William Pole-Carew
- Carew (surname)
