= Nikolayevich =

Nikolayevich is a name. People associated with this name include:

== Surname ==
- Nicholas Nikolayevich (disambiguation)
- Grand Duke Konstantin Nikolayevich of Russia
- Nikita Nikolayevich
- Alexei Nikolaevich, Tsarevich of Russia

== Middle name ==
- Mikhail Nikolayevich Baryshnikov
- Mikhail Nikolayevich Tukhachevsky
- Aleksey Nikolayevich Tolstoy
- Aleksandr Nikolayevich Rozenberg
- Vadim Nikolayevich Krasnoselsky
- Andrei Nikolayevich Bolkonsky
- Anatoly Nikolayevich Bukreyev
- Aleksey Nikolayevich Kosygin
- Alexander Nikolayevich Scriabin
- Boris Nikolayevich Yeltsin
- Pyotr Nikolayevich Wrangel
- Andrey Nikolayevich Kolmogorov
- Andrey Nikolayevich Mordvichev
- Andrey Nikolayevich Tychonoff
- Alexandre Nikolayevich Benois
- Nikolai Nikolayevich Yudenich
- Andrei Nikolayevich Tupolev
- Eduard Nikolayevich Artem'yev
- Igor Nikolayevich Smirnov
- Aleksandr Nikolayevich Radishchev
- Aleksandr Nikolayevich Ostrovsky
- Vladimir Nikolayevich Petrov
- Mikhail Nikolayevich von Giers
- Georgy Nikolayevich Flyorov
- Alexei Nikolayevich Kuropatkin
- Sergey Nikolayevich Bulgakov
- Pavel Nikolayevich Milyukov
- Mikhail Nikolayevich Muravyov
- Bogdan Nikolayevich Stashinsky
- Gennady Nikolayevich Timchenko
- Dmitry Nikolayevich Kuznetsov
- Andrei Nikolayevich Voronikhin
- Vsevolod Nikolayevich Merkulov
- Kirsan Nikolayevich Ilyumzhinov
- Vladimir Nikolayevich Morozov (footballer)
- Vladimir Nikolayevich Nikitin
- Pavel Nikolayevich Rybnikov
- Alexei Nikolayevich Kuropatkin
- Mikhail Nikolayevich Muravyov
- Georgy Nikolayevich Flyorov
- Vsevolod Nikolayevich Merkulov
- Pavel Nikolayevich Milyukov
- Dmitry Nikolayevich Patrushev
- Bogdan Nikolayevich Stashinsky
- Vladimir Nikolayevich Nikitin
- Valery Nikolayevich Soyfer
- Pyotr Nikolayevich Krasnov
- Petr Nikolayevich Durnovo
- Yevgeni Nikolayevich Andreyev
- Vladimir Nikolayevich Obraztsov
- Sergei Nikolayevich Mikayev
- Vladislav Nikolayevich Volkov
- Pyotr Nikolayevich Lebedev
- Alexander Nikolayevich Prokofiev de Seversky
- Nikolay Nikolayevich Raevsky
- Georgy Nikolayevich Tchaikovsky
- Andrey Nikolayevich Malakhov
- Alexander Nikolayevich Afanasyev
- Alexander Nikolayevich Lodygin
- Boris Nikolayevich Bugayev
- Nikolai Nikolayevich Semenov
- Vladimir Nikolayevich Orlov
- Mikhail Nikolayevich Smirnov (general)
- Mikhail Nikolayevich Pokrovski
- Boris Nikolayevich Delaunay
- Vladimir Nikolayevich Toporov
- Vladimir Nikolayevich Chelomei
- Alexey Nikolayevich Verstovsky
- Pavel Nikolayevich Filonov
- Nikolai Nikolayevich Durnovo
- Alexander Nikolayevich Mikhaylov
- Mikhail Nikolayevich Kuznetsov (rower)
- Vladimir Nikolayevich Kokovtsoff
- Pavel Nikolayevich Demidov
- Dmitry Nikolayevich Medvedev
- Andrei Nikolayevich Paly
- Leonid Nikolayevich Andreyev
- Nikolay Nikolayevich Dukhonin
- Nikolay Nikolayevich Kedrov
- Peter Nikolayevich Toburokov
- Pyotr Nikolayevich Gruzinsky
- Aleksandr Nikolayevich Denisov
- Pyotr Nikolayevich Durnovo
- Alexey Nikolayevich Krutikov
- Mikhail Nikolayevich Muravyov (1796)
- Vladimir Nikolayevich Ipatieff
- Aleksandr Nikolayevich Balandin
- Boris Nikolayevich Ponomarev
- Pavel Nikolayevich Yablochkov
- Georgi Nikolayevich Babakin
- Gennady Nikolayevich Troshev
- Viktor Nikolayevich Belyayev
- Yuri Nikolayevich Grigorovich
- Gennadiy Nikolayevich Seleznyov
- Albert Nikolayevich Shiryaev
- Mikhail Nikolayevich Chigir
- Georgiy Nikolayevich Daneliya
- Anatoly Nikolayevich Levchenko
- Svyatoslav Nikolayevich Fyodorov
- Alexander Nikolayevich Saburov
- Alexander Nikolayevich Serov
- Grigory Nikolayevich Potanin
- Alexander Nikolayevich Samokhvalov
- Vadim Nikolayevich Ershov

=== Fictional characters with the name ===
- Pyotr Nikolayevich Rasputin
