= Nick Davis =

Nick Davis may refer to:

- Nick Davis (American football) (born 1979), American football player
- Nick Davis (footballer) (born 1980), Australian rules footballer
- Nick Davis (record producer), English sound engineer and record producer
- Nick Davis (television and movie producer) (born 1965), writer, director, and producer
- Nick Davis (visual effects supervisor), active in the film industry since the early 1990s
- Nick Davis, a character in 30 Minutes or Less
- Nick Davis, a character on All My Children

== See also ==
- Nicholas Davis Jr. (1825–1875), Alabama politician
- Nick Davies (born 1953), British investigative journalist
- Nicholas Davies (disambiguation)
