= Nicholas Livas =

Greek-American basketball player

Free agent
- Position: Small forward

Personal information
- Born: April 27, 1987 (age 39) Cary, Illinois
- Listed height: 6 ft 6 in (1.98 m)
- Listed weight: 220 lb (100 kg)

Career information
- High school: Prairie Ridge (Crystal Lake, Illinois)
- College: Olivet Nazarene (2005–2006); McKendree (2006–2007); Illinois Springfield (2007–2009)
- NBA draft: 2009: undrafted
- Playing career: 2009–present

Career history
- 2009–2010: Tromsø
- 2010–2011: Glasgow Rocks
- 2011–2012: Prievidza
- 2012: Chicago Muscle
- 2012–2014: Göttingen
- 2015–2016: Kavala

Career highlights
- ProA champion (2014)

Nicholas Livas (Greek: Νίκος Λίβας; born April 27, 1987) is a Greek-American professional basketball player. He is 1.98 m tall. He plays the small forward position.

== Professional career ==
Livas started playing basketball in US where he stayed until the end of the 2008–09 season. After college, he joined the Norway's premier professional men's basketball league club Tromsø Storm and played with the squad during the 2009–10 season.

In 2010, he joined the big British Basketball League club Glasgow Rocks.

Livas moved to Prievidza for the 2011–12 season. He also played for Chicago Muscle in 2012.

In 2012, he signed with Göttingen where he stayed for 2 seasons and in 2014 he managed to achieve the promotion to the Bundesliga with his team.

In 2015, he signed a one year old deal with Kavala.
