= Miklós =

Miklós a given name, the Hungarian form of the Greek Νικόλαος (English Nicholas), and may refer to:

== In Hungarian politics ==
- Miklós Bánffy, Hungarian nobleman, politician, and novelist
- Miklós Horthy, Regent of the Kingdom of Hungary
- Miklós Kállay, Hungarian politician who served as Prime Minister of Hungary during World War II
- Miklós Lukáts, Hungarian politician and state secretary
- Miklós Németh, Prime Minister of Hungary
- Miklós Pálffy (1657–1732), Hungarian nobleman
- Miklós Wesselényi, Hungarian statesman

== In Hungarian literature ==
- Miklós Radnóti, Hungarian poet from Budapest who fell victim to the Holocaust
- Miklós Vámos, Hungarian writer
- Miklós Mészöly, Hungarian writer

== In artistry ==
- Miklós Barabás, Hungarian painter
- Miklós Izsó, Hungarian sculptor
- Miklós Ybl, one of Europe's leading architects in the mid to late nineteenth century

== In sport ==
- Miklós Dudás (canoeist) (1991–2026), Hungarian sprint canoeist
- Miklós Fehér, Hungarian football player
- Miklós Gaál, football player of Hajduk Split
- Miklos Tassilo Csillaghy, Italian equestrian
- Miklós Herczeg, Hungarian football player
- Miklós Kovács International football player and coach
- Miklós Mandl, birth name of Nickolas Muray (1892–1965), Hungarian-born American photographer and Olympic fencer
- Miklos Molnar, Danish football (soccer) player
- Miklós Németh (sportsman), Hungarian javelin thrower

== In military ==
- Miklós Horthy, Regent of Hungary during the interwar years and throughout most of World War II
- Miklós Steinmetz, Hungarian-born Soviet Red Army captain

== In other fields ==
- Miklós Ajtai, (born 1946) Hungarian-American computer scientist
- Miklós Hajmássy (1900–1990), Hungarian actor
- Miklós "Mickey" Hargitay, Hungarian-American bodybuilder and actor
- Miklós Jancsó, Hungarian film director and screenwriter
- Miklos Kanitz, Hungarian-Canadian Holocaust survivor
- Miklós Laczkovich, Hungarian mathematician noted for his work on geometric measure theory
- Miklós Nyiszli, Jewish prisoner doctor at Auschwitz
- Paulo Miklos, Brazilian rock musician
- Miklos Perlus (born 1977), Canadian actor and screenwriter
- Miklós Rózsa, Hungarian-American composer
- Miklós Szabó (middle-distance runner) (1908-2000), Hungarian middle distance runner
- Miklós Szabó (long-distance runner) (1928–2022), Hungarian long distance runner
- Miklós Zrínyi, a.k.a. Nikola Zrinski 17th century military leader, statesman and poet
- Miklós Balogh de Galántha, Hungarian involved with the Russian Revolution of 1905

== In fiction ==
- Miklos Atreides, fictional historical character in Frank Herbert's Dune universe
- Lukas Miklos, character in the Left Behind novel series
- Miklós Molnar, comedic character portrayed on television by Ernie Kovacs
- Miklós Toldi, legendary hero in Hungarian folklore

== See also ==
- Mikloš (surname)
