= Nicholas Carew =

Nicholas Carew may refer to:

- Nicholas Carew (died 1311) of Carew Castle and Moulsford, soldier during reign of Edward I of England
- Sir Nicholas Carew (Lord Privy Seal) (died 1390), Lord Privy Seal during the reign of Edward III of England
- Nicholas Carew (died 1432), Member of Parliament and sheriff for Surrey
- Nicholas Carew (Henry VIII courtier) (1496–1539), courtier and statesman during the reign of Henry VIII of England
- Nicholas Throckmorton (alias Carew) (died 1644), Member of Parliament for Lyme Regis in 1601 and Surrey in 1621
- Nicholas Carew (1635–1688), Member of Parliament for Gatton, 1664–1685
- Sir Nicholas Carew, 1st Baronet (1687–1727), Member of Parliament for Haslemere, 1708–1710 and 1714–1722, and Surrey, 1722–1727

== See also ==
- Carew (disambiguation)
