= Nicholas Roosevelt =

Nicholas Roosevelt may refer to:

- Nicholas Roosevelt (1658–1742), early Roosevelt ancestor, and New York City alderman
- Nicholas Roosevelt (silversmith) (1715–1769), New York City silversmith
- Nicholas Roosevelt (inventor) (1767–1854), played a role in the development of the steamboat
- Nicholas Roosevelt (diplomat) (1893–1982), diplomat, journalist and author

== See also ==
- Roosevelt family
