= Nick Alexander =

Nick Alexander may refer to:

- Nick Alexander (author) (born 1964)
- Nick Alexander (ski jumper) (born 1988)
- Nick Alexander (merchandise manager), member of the Eagles of Death Metal crew who was killed at the Bataclan during the November 2015 Paris attacks
- Nick Alexander (comedian), see Lee Camp (comedian)

== See also ==
- Nicholas Alexander (disambiguation)
