= Mikloš =

Mikloš (feminine: Miklošová) is a surname. Notable people with the surname include:

- Drahomíra Miklošová (1953), Czech politician
- Ivan Mikloš (born 1960), Slovak politician
- Karol Mikloš (born 1972), Slovak musician

== See also ==
- Miklós
