= Nicholas Adams =

Nic, Nick, Nicky or Nicholas Adams may refer to:

== Performers ==
- Nick Adams (actor, born 1931) (1931–1968), American TV, film and theater actor
- Nick Adams (actor, born 1983), American musical theater dancer
- Nic Adams, Australian guitarist, co-founder of 2011 deathcore band Justice for the Damned

== Politicians ==
- Nicholas Adams (died 1584) (c.1521–c.1584), English MP for West Looe and Dartmouth
- Nicholas Adams (died 1628), English MP for Pembroke (UK Parliament constituency)
- Nick Adams (commentator) also known as Nick Adamopoulos (born 1984), former local councillor and American conservative author

== Sportsmen ==
- Nick Adams (racing driver) (born 1948), English sportscar competitor
- Nicholas Adams (cricketer) (born 1967), English right-handed batsman
- Nick Adams (rugby union) (born 1977), English prop and coach
- Nicky Adams (born 1986), English footballer

== Writers ==
- Nicholas Adams, joint pen name of married American novelists Debra Doyle (1952–2020) and James D. Macdonald (born 1954)
- Nicholas Adams, pen name of English novelist John Peel (writer) (born 1954)
- Nick Adams (writer) (born 1973), African American author of Making Friends with Black People

== Characters ==
- Nick Adams (character), American protagonist of Hemingway's 1920s/1930s short stories

== See also ==
- Nicholas Adam (1716–1792), French linguist and translator
- Nicolas Adames (1813–1887), first Bishop of Luxembourg
- Nic Adam (1881–1957), Luxembourgian Olympic gymnast
