= Nicu (disambiguation) =

Nicu or NICU may refer to:

- Nicu, a given name or surname (with a list of people of this name)
- Neonatal intensive care unit, for newborn infants
- Neurological intensive care unit, for brain injuries etc.
- Nicu's Spoon Theater Company, American theater company
