= Nicholas Walsh =

Nicholas/Nicolas Walsh or Nick Walsh may refer to:

- Nicholas Walsh (bishop) (died 1585), bishop of Ossory in the Church of Ireland
- Nicholas Walsh (judge) (1542–1615), Irish judge, politician and landowner
- Nicholas Walsh (soccer), Australian footballer
- Nicolas Walsh (physician), American physiatrist
- Nicolas Eugene Walsh (1916–1997), American prelate of the Roman Catholic Church
- Nicholas Walsh (Home and Away), fictional character on the Australian soap opera Home and Away
- Nick Walsh, lead singer of Canadian band Slik Toxik
- Nick Paton Walsh (born 1977), British journalist
- Nick Walsh (referee), Scottish football referee
- Nick Walsh (footballer) (born 1965), Australian rules footballer

== See also ==
- Nick Walshe (born 1974), English rugby union footballer
- Nicholas Walshe, English politician, MP for Gloucestershire
