= Nikica =

Nikica is a masculine given name. Nikica is a hypocoristic of the name Nikola. It may refer to:

- Nikica Cukrov (born 1954), a former Croatian football player
- Nikica Gabrić (born 1961), physician and politician
- Nikica Jelavić (born 1985), a Herzegovinian-born Croatian footballer
- Nikica Klinčarski (born 1957), a former Macedonian football player
- Nikica Kolumbić (1930–2009), historian and lexicographer
- Nikica Ljubek (born 1980), a Croatian sprint canoeist who competed in the early 2000s
- Nikica Maglica (born 1965), a Croatian former football player
- Nikica Milenković (born 1959), footballer
- Nikica Valentić (1950–2023), a Croatian politician

== See also ==
- Nikita (given name)
