= Nicholas Hammond (disambiguation) =

Nicholas Hammond (born 1950) is an American and Australian actor and writer.

Nicholas or Nick Hammond may also refer to:

- Nick Hammond (cricketer) (born 1998), English cricketer
- N. G. L. Hammond (1907–2001), British historian
- Nicholas Hammond (ornithologist), English ornithologist and author
- Nick Hammond (born 1967), English footballer
- Nicolas Hammond (born 1964), British author, Rubik's Cube expert
