= Clapton (surname) =

Clapton is an English surname. Notable people with the surname include:

- Danny Clapton (1934–1986), English footballer
- Eric Clapton (born 1945), English musician
- Michele Clapton, British costume designer
- Nathaniel L. Clapton (1903–1967), English schoolmaster
- Nicholas Clapton (born 1955), English singer and writer
- Richard Clapton (born 1951), Australian musician

Fictional characters

- Jamie Clapton, from the British soap opera Doctors
