= Aleksander Mikołajczak =

Polish film, theatre and dubbing actor (born 1953)

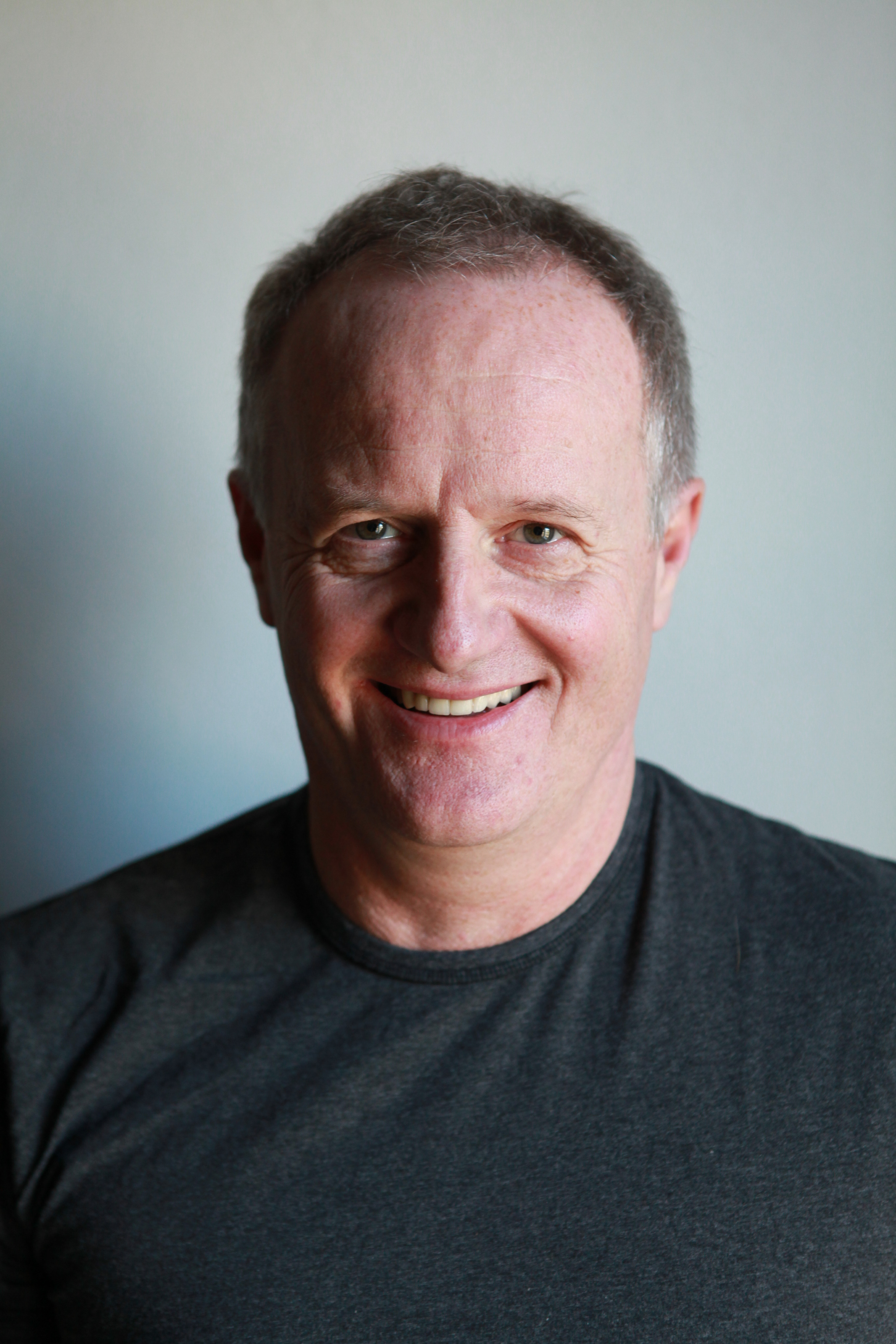
- Born: 24 January 1953 (age 72); Poland
- Occupation: Actor
- Children: 2

Aleksander Mikołajczak (born 24 January 1953 in Poland) is a Polish film, theatre and dubbing actor.

== Biography ==
He graduated from the Ludwik Solski Academy for the Dramatic Arts in Kraków in 1976 and a year later he received his diploma. He co-created the MamTeatr project with his wife, Marzanna Graff. He is also a guest at the Polonia Theatre in Warsaw.

He worked at the Helena Modrzejewska Dramatic Theatre in Legnica (1977-1978), the Jan Kochanowski Theatre in Opole (1978-1979), the Stefan Jaracz Theatre in Łódź (1979-1983), the New Theatre in Warsaw (1983-1989) and the Borderland in Suwalki (1990-1991).

Since 2009 he has been the Honorary Ambassador of Children with Brain Tumors.

In 2010 he received the Amber tree award in the "Best Actor" category for his role in the play "Heart of Power" (pol. Serca Moc).

In 2011 he was awarded the honorary title of "Ambassador of the Siberians" for his role in the play "Give me your hand" (pol. Podaj Dłoń).

=== Personal life ===
He has two children, actress Izabella Miko and a son. His wife is a writer, screenwriter and actress.
