= Nicholas Rowe =

Nicholas or Nick Rowe may refer to:

- Nicholas Rowe (writer) (1674–1718), English dramatist and Poet Laureate
- James N. Rowe or Nick Rowe (1938–1989), American military officer and prisoner of war during the Vietnam War
- Nicholas Rowe (actor) (born 1966), British actor
- Nicholas Rowe (producer), American music producer
- Nick Rowe, guitarist with Bloodsimple from 2002 to 2008
