= Nicholas Thomas =

Nicholas Thomas may refer to:

- Nick Thomas (theatre producer) (born 1959), British entertainment entrepreneur
- Nicholas W. Thomas (1810–1864), American politician
- Nicholas Thomas (anthropologist) (born 1960), British anthropologist
- Nicky Thomas (rugby union), (born 1994), Welsh rugby union footballer
- Nicholas Thomas (British Army officer), British general
- Nick Thomas, former bassist and guitarist for Twenty One Pilots

== See also ==
- Nicky Thomas (singer) (1949–1990), Jamaican reggae singer, otherwise Cecil Thomas
- Nicki Thomas
- Nikki Thomas
