= Thomas Nicholas =

Thomas Nicholas may refer to:

- Thomas Nicholas (MP) (c. 1575–1638), English politician
- Thomas Nicholas (antiquary) (1816–1879), Welsh antiquary and educator
- Thomas Ian Nicholas (born 1980), American film actor, singer, musician, producer, director, and writer
- Thomas Evan Nicholas (Niclas y Glais) (1879–1971), Welsh language poet, preacher and radical

== See also ==
- Thomas St Nicholas, MP for Canterbury
