= Nicholas Davies =

Nicholas Davies may refer to:

- Nicholas Davies (journalist), journalist and author, formerly foreign editor at the Daily Mirror
- Nick Davies (born 1953), British investigative journalist for The Guardian and The Observer
- Nicholas Davies (cricketer) (born 1975), English cricketer
- Nicholas Barry Davies (born 1952), British zoologist
- Nicholas Llewelyn Davies (1903–1980), youngest of the Llewelyn Davies boys, inspiration for Peter Pan and the Lost Boys

== See also ==
- Nick Davis (disambiguation)
