= Nicholas Mitchell =

Nicholas Mitchell may refer to:

- Nick Mitchell (born 1982), American mixed martial artist and retired professional wrestler
- Nick Douglas (born 1967), née Nicholas Mitchell, American musician
- Nicholas Mitchell (presenter), British expert at the Antiques Roadshow, Series 27

== See also ==
- Nicholas Michel (fl. 1353), merchant and MP and mayor for Coventry
