= Louis Collenot d'Angremont =

French counter-revolutionary (1748–1792)

- Born: 1748; Dijon, Kingdom of France
- Died: 21 August 1792 (aged 43–44); Paris, French First Republic

Signature
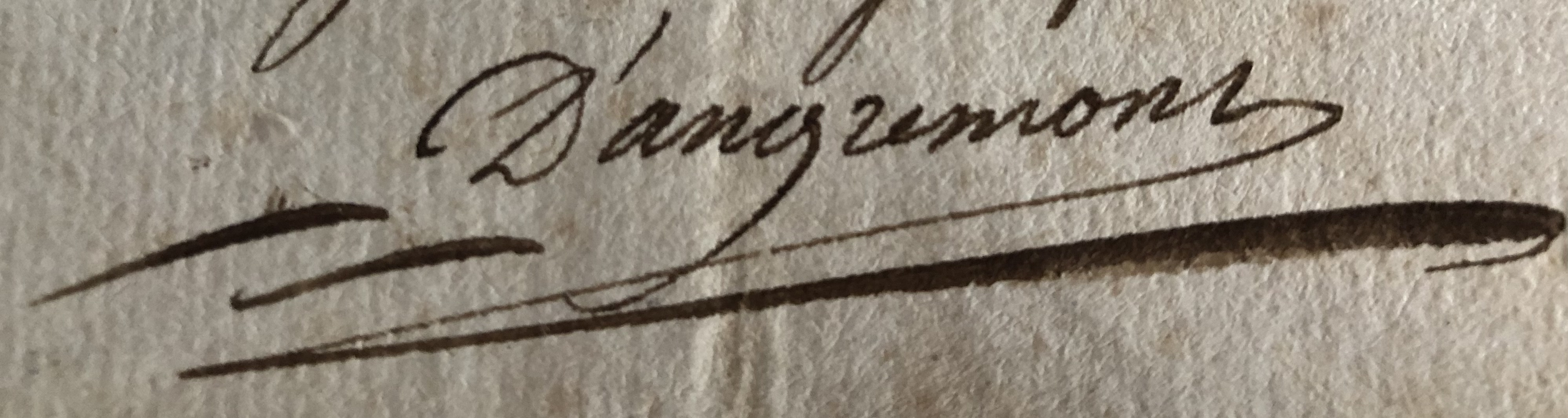

Louis-David Collenot d’Angremont, also known as Dangremont (1748 – 21 August 1792) was a writer and secretary of the administration of the National Guard of Paris. He remains a royalist and counter-revolutionary famous for having been the first to be guillotined for his political ideas, on 21 August 1792.

== Biography ==
Little is known about his origins: Collenot d’Angremont was born in Dijon and grandson of a jailer, or even a provincial executioner. But for some, he would have come from the minor nobility and knight of Saint-Louis. Sometimes given as a relative of Calonne, he was first a language teacher and tutor to the young Marie-Antoinette. We follow him through various documents and registers:? secretary of the King of Poland, Freemason initiated in 1772, lawyer in Parliament, president of the National and Foreign Museum (rue Mazarine); finally he is said to be an "emigration agent".

From July 1789, he was employed in the offices of the Paris City Hall and then became secretary of the administration of the National Guard in 1792.

He is accused of having led, on behalf of the Court, a conspiracy of counter-revolutionary agents seeking to prevent the capture of the Tuileries and the overthrow of the monarchy on 10 August 1792; according to Olivier Blanc, he "had formed veritable organised bands of provocateurs who infiltrated all public demonstrations to cause them to derail."

After a 30-hour trial, he was guillotined by torchlight on the evening of 21 August 1792, on the Place de la Réunion (now Place du Carrousel).

In his Journal during a stay in France on 1 September 1792, the Scottish physician John Moore describes him as the leader of a "numerous troop of about 1,500 men divided into detachments of ten men each, led by a captain and a lieutenant" and fond of playing with a lead stick ironically called "the Constitution."

== Publications ==
He is credited with several unpublished writings:

- une Grammaire française (submitted to the Assembly);
- une Grammaire anglaise;
- une Méthode pour apprendre l’anglais;
- un Discourse on Education;
- a drama: Ariadne auf Naxos;
- a correspondence;
- des Essais poétiques

== Bibliography ==
- Wallon, H. (1880). Histoire du Tribunal révolutionnaire de Paris (in-8°) (in French). Paris: Librairie Hachette. pp. 11–12.
- Monselet, Charles (1853). Histoire anecdotique du Tribunal révolutionnaire (in-18) (in French). Paris: D. Giraud et J. Dagneau. p. 323.
