= Miklós Steinmetz =

Hungarian-born Soviet army captain

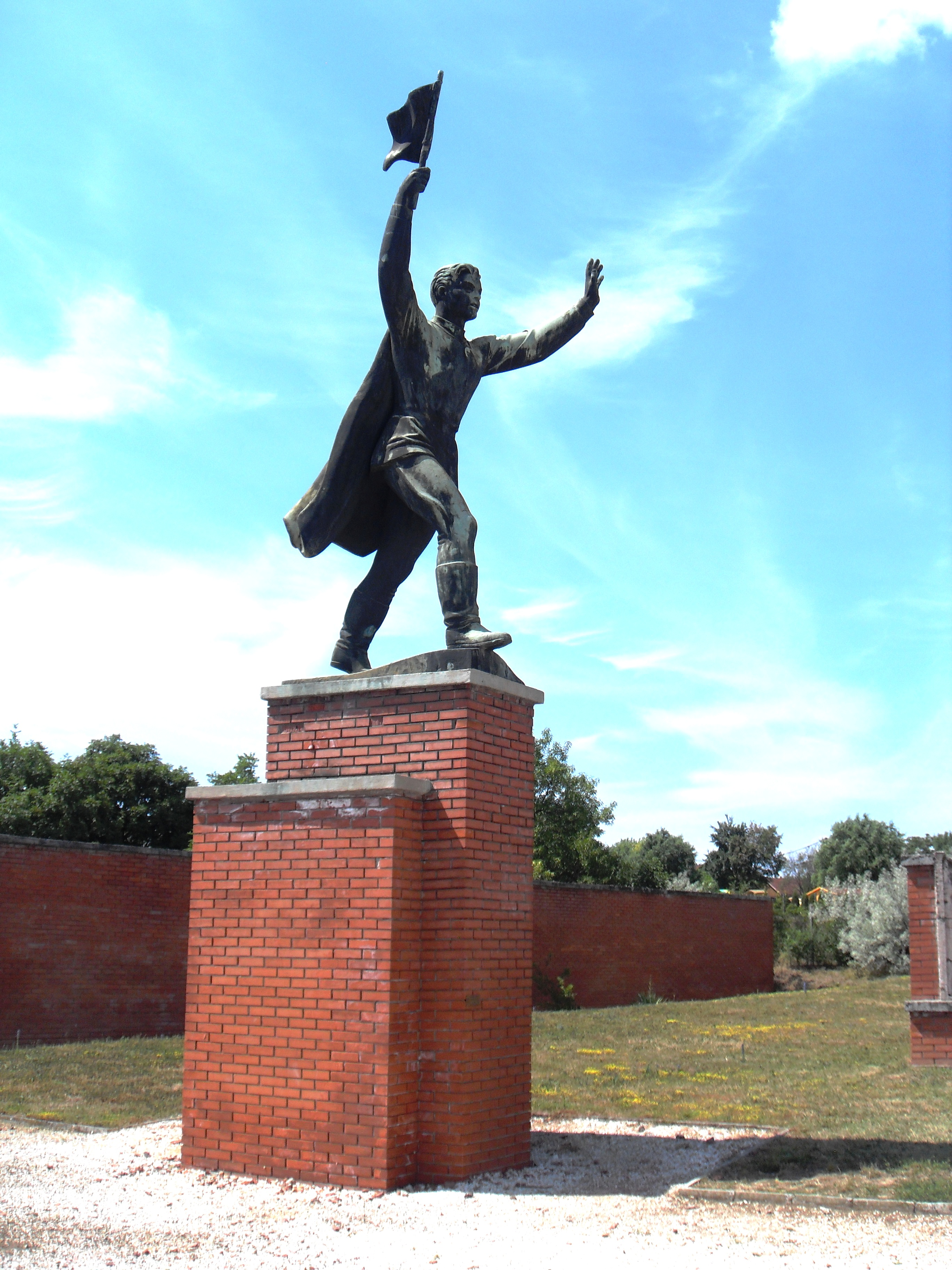
A statue of Steinmetz

Miklós Steinmetz (1913 – December 1944) was a Hungarian-born Soviet Red Army captain. He fought on the Eastern Front of the Second World War and was killed by mortar fire. His name was used in Soviet propaganda and a story concocted that he and fellow officer, Captain Ostapenko, had been trying to save Budapest from a long siege by negotiating a German surrender. A Soviet statue of Steinmetz on the border of Budapest and Vecsés was taken down during the Hungarian Revolution of 1956. A replacement was erected in 1958 and remains in Liberty Square, Pest.

His parents were communists, and after the fall of the Hungarian Soviet Republic in 1919, the family fled to South America before immigrating to the Soviet Union. Steinmetz became a member of the Komsomol – the Soviet Communist Youth Organization, and then fought on the Republican side in the Spanish Civil War, becoming a captain in the Red Army during World War II.

According to Soviet propaganda, in December 1944 (during the Battle of Budapest), when Soviet forces had encircled the Nazi German-controlled Hungarian capital, he delivered the ultimatum demanding the Germans and Hungarians to surrender. He was killed before the Soviet takeover of the city, when his car ran over a mine on the Üllői avenue in Pestszentlőrinc (today part of Budapest).
