= Pierre Solomon Ségalas d'Etchépare =

French physician

Pierre Salomon Ségalas d'Etchépare
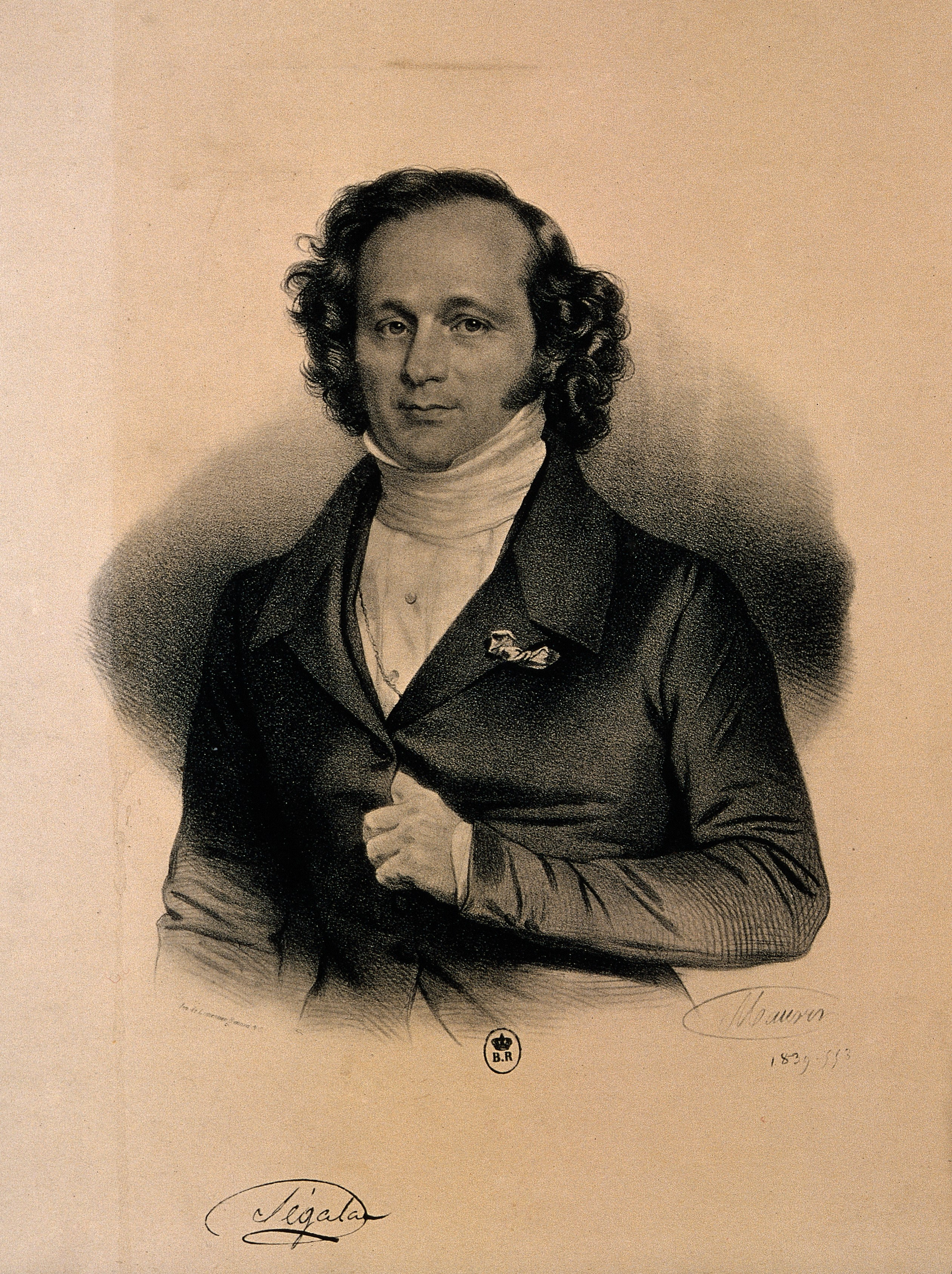
- Pierre Salomon Ségalas d'Etchépare
- Born: 1 August 1792; Saint-Palais, Pyrénées-Atlantiques, France
- Died: 19 October 1875 (aged 83); Paris
- Known for: "speculum for urethra"
- Scientific career
- Fields: medicine

Pierre Salomon Ségalas d'Etchépare (1 August 1792, Saint-Palais, Pyrénées-Atlantiques – 19 October 1875) was a French medical doctor. He is noted for creating the "speculum for urethra", the precursor to the endoscope, which was presented in 1826 to the Academy of Science in Paris, and for the idea of practising an exclusive speciality.
