= Nicholas Roosevelt (silversmith) =

American silversmith

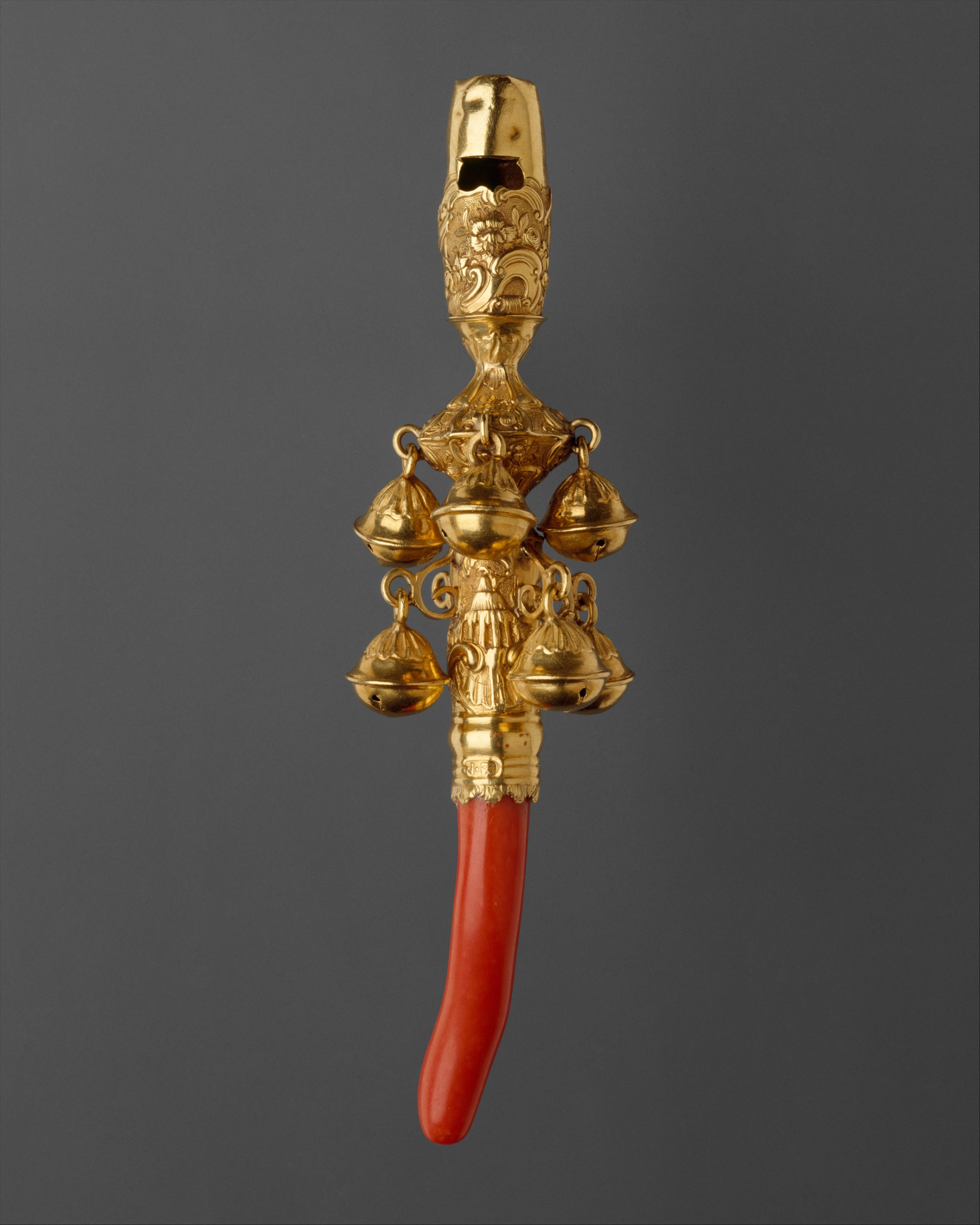
Rattle, whistle, and bells, by Nicholas Roosevelt, 1755–1768

Nicholas Roosevelt (1715 - June 1769) was an silversmith from the Thirteen Colonies, active in New York City.

Roosevelt was born in New York City, where he was christened on June 16, 1715, in the New York Dutch Church. He was apprenticed circa 1730 to Cornelius Wynkoop, made a freeman of the city on March 20, 1738, and married twice: to Catherine Comfort on June 4, 1737, then to Elizabeth Thurman on 24 November 24, 1754. He served on a coroner's jury and on the Common Council, which commissioned him to make gold presentation boxes. His advertisement in the New York Gazette and the Weekly Mercury on January 30, 1769, documents the end of his career:

"To be Let, and enter'd upon the 1st of May next, The house in which Nicholas Roosevelt now lives, at the lower end of Thames Street, on the wharf fronting the North-River: The conveniency and commodiousness of the situation excells any on the river; it fronts two slips, one of which is near 100 feet broad, and the greatest part of the year is fill'd with boats and crafts, from the Jersies and North-River. Is a roomy and convenient house, with seven fire-places; a large yard, in which is a pump and cistern, and a garden and grass plot. Likewise a silver-smith's shop to be let, and the tools of the trade to be sold. Also to be sold by said Roosevelt, a parcel of ready made silver, large and small, Viz. Silver tea-pots and tea spoons, silver hilted swords, sauce-boats, salts and shovels, soup-spoons both scollep'd and plain, table spoons, tea tongs, punch ladles and strainers, milk-pots, snuff-boxes, and sundry other small articles, both gold and silver, as buckles, clasps, buttons, broaches, rings, and lockets, both plain and set with paste moco, &c. &c. which he will sell very reasonable, as he intends declining business, and to move in the Country in the Spring."

Roosevelt's work is collected in the Metropolitan Museum of Art.
