= Nicholas Brooks =

Nicholas Brooks may refer to:

- Nicholas Brooks (historian) (1941–2014), English medieval historian
- Nicholas Brooks (special effects artist) (born 1964), British visual effects artist
- Nicholas Brooks (murderer), convicted of the murder of his girlfriend, Sylvie Cachay
- Nicholas Brooks (figure skater), American figure skater

== See also ==
- Nick Brooks
