= Iisakki Nikkola =

Finnish politician (1887–1959)

A photo of Iisakki Nikkola

Iisakki Elias Nikkola (11 May 1887 – 20 January 1959) was a Finnish politician, born in Kurikka. He was a member of the Parliament of Finland as a representative of the Patriotic People's Movement (IKL) from 1933 to 1944, as an independent from 1944 to 1945 (after the IKL was banned on 23 September 1944) and as a representative of the National Coalition Party from 1951 to 1952.
