= Nikolas Caoile =

American musician

Nikolas Caoile is an American conductor, pianist, and percussionist. In 2010, he was appointed music director and conductor of the Wenatchee Valley Symphony Orchestra. And, since 2006 he has served as director of orchestras at Central Washington University's Department of Music. He has also served as music director of the Lake Union Civic Orchestra and principal conductor of the Salem Chamber Orchestra.

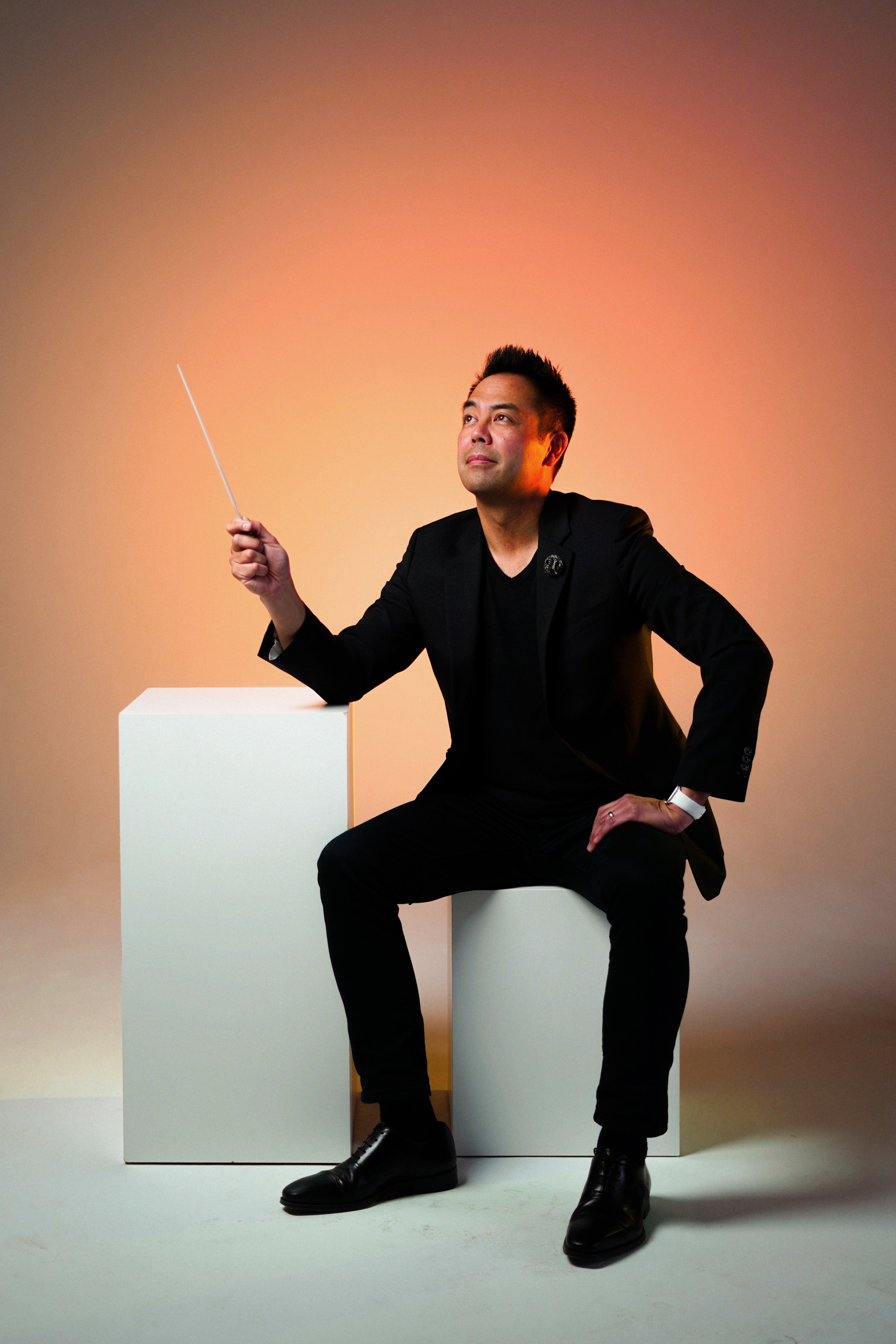
Caoile with Third Angle (PC: Clamber)

== Early life ==
Caoile's father, Agerico Torio Caoile, is a self-taught musician born and raised in Manila, Philippines. His mother, Bachyen Nguyen Caoile, is an accountant born in Vietnam. Caoile started piano at the age of six. Later, he studied to become a pianist and percussionist and was a member of Portland Youth Philharmonic. He received training under Huw Edwards at the Olympia Symphony Orchestra; Bruce McIntosh, a professor emeritus at Willamette University; and Peter Erős at the University of Washington. He eventually received his doctorate from the University of Michigan under Kenneth Kiesler and took a masterclass course in music with Lorin Maazel at the University of Michigan.

== Career ==
Caoile's professional conducting debut was in 2002 with the Olympia Symphony Orchestra. In 2009, he conducted the Philharmonic Orchestra of the Americas in collaboration with Christopher Wheeldon's Morphoses Dance Company at New York City Center. From 2012 to 2016 Caoile was a conductor and artistic director of the Salem Chamber Orchestra. He has also served as a guest conductor at the Gig Harbor Symphony, Northwest Mahler Festival Orchestra, Lake Avenue Orchestra, as well as Rainier Symphony, Orchestra Seattle and Seattle Chamber Singers, Emerald Ballet Theatre, Olympia Symphony, Auburn Symphony, Yakima Symphony Orchestra, Missoula Symphony, and Walla Walla Symphony. Caoile has served as a guest conductor for the Alaska, Idaho, and Indiana All-State Orchestras.

Currently, he serves as a music director and conductor of the Wenatchee Valley Symphony Orchestra, director of orchestras at Central Washington University. He is the former music director and conductor of Lake Union Civic Orchestra. In an interview, Caoile said that his current orchestral interests include: Jean Sibelius's symphonies, Erich Wolfgang Korngold's film scores, Maurice Ravel's ballet scores, and Benjamin Britten's operas. In 2023, Caoile completed a performing and recording project of Philip Glass' 1,000 Airplanes on the Roof with Third Angle New Music.

At Central Washington University, Caoile has led the CWU Symphony Orchestra to invited performances with the Washington Music Educators Association State Conference (2008, 2010, 2016, and 2024) and National Association for Music Educators NW Regional Conference (2011, 2013). In 2018, Caoile conducted Central Washington University's Symphony Orchestra at the John F. Kennedy Center for the Performing Arts for Capital Orchestra Festival. In December 2021, Caoile conducted the Central Washington Symphony Orchestra at The Midwest Clinic in Chicago. The orchestra performed The Rite of Spring, Ravel's Tzigane, and the world premiere of Karel Butz' Diamond Jubilee (for the 75th anniversary of The Midwest Clinic).

On November 14, 2020, Caoile made his debut as a piano concerto soloist, conducting and performing Philip Glass' Piano Concerto No. 3 from the piano with the Wenatchee Valley Symphony Orchestra. In 2022, he performed the piece with Sempre Chamber Music.

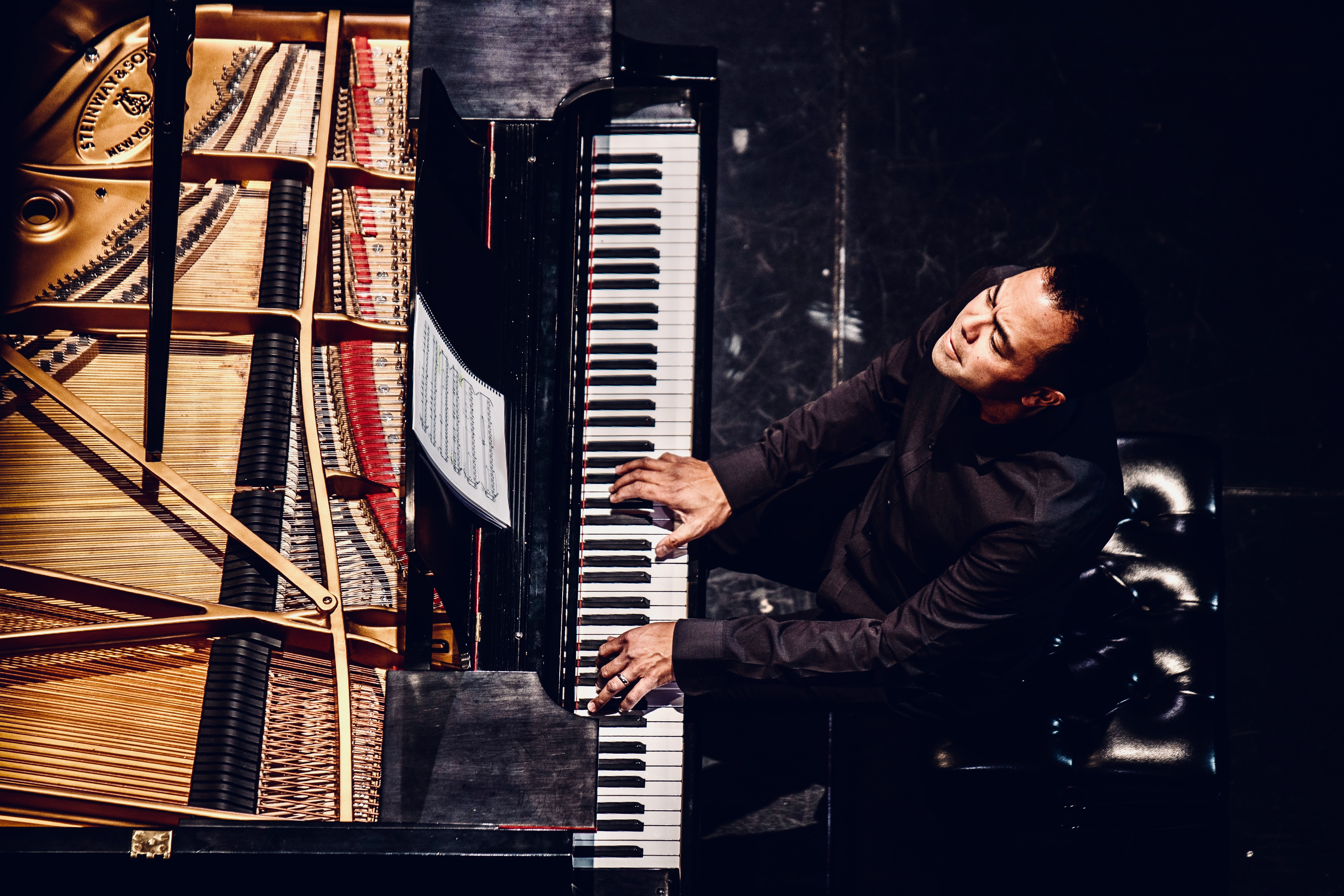

On May 21, 2025, Caoile led the Wenatchee Valley Symphony Orchestra in a performance of Tchaikovsky's Swan Lake with the Grand Kyiv Ballet at McCaw Hall.

== Personal life ==
Caoile is married to mezzo-soprano, Dr. Melissa Schiel (CWU professor of voice).

In May 2024, Caoile became a member of Mensa International (Columbia River Chapter).

== Awards ==
In 2016, he was awarded Outstanding Achievement in Orchestral Direction from the Washington State chapter of the American String Teachers Association. In 2019, Caoile was awarded the Distinguished Alumni Citation from Willamette University.
