= Clopton (name) =

Clopton is both a surname and a given name. Notable people with the name include:

- David Clopton (1820–1892), Alabama politician
- Hugh Clopton (c. 1440 – 1496), Lord Mayor of the City of London
- John Clopton (1756–1816), a United States Representative
- Walter Clopton (died 1400), English lawyer and Chief Justice of the King's Bench
- Clopton Havers (1657–1702) pioneering English physician
- Clopton Lloyd-Jones (1858–1918), English businessman, footballer and cricketer
