= Niek te Veluwe =

Dutch footballer

Personal information
- Date of birth: 21 December 1993 (age 32)
- Place of birth: Doetinchem, Netherlands
- Position: Defensive midfielder

Team information
- Current team: AZSV
- Number: 6

Senior career*
Years	Team	Apps	(Gls)
2012–2013	De Graafschap	5	(0)
2013–	AZSV	45	(7)
- * Club domestic league appearances and goals as of 8 November 2024

Niek te Veluwe (born 21 December 1993) is a Dutch footballer who plays as a midfielder for AZSV.

== Club career ==
Te Veluwe made his debut in professional football for De Graafschap in the match versus FC Den Bosch. He replaced Tim Vincken in the second half. He played for the same amateur club as the likes of Siem de Jong and Luuk de Jong, DZC '68. Former teammate Caner Cavlan also played for DZC '68.
