= Nicholas Alexander =

Nicholas Alexander may refer to:

- Nicholas Alexander, 7th Earl of Caledon (born 1955), son of Denis Alexander, 6th Earl of Caledon
- Nicholas Alexander of Wallachia (died 1364), Prince of Wallachia 1352–1364
- Nicholas Alexander (ski jumper) (born 1988), American competitive ski jumper
- Nicholas Alexander, a character from The West Wing seasons 5 and 6

== See also ==
- Nick Alexander (disambiguation)
