= Nikola Janković =

Nikola Janković may refer to:

- Nikola Janković (football) (born 1993), Serbian footballer
- Nikola Janković (basketball) (born 1994), Serbian basketball player
- Nikola Janković (sculptor) (1926–2017), Serbian sculptor
- Nikola Janković (icon painter) (fl. 19th c.), Serbian icon painter and woodcarver from Macedonia

== See also ==
- Niko Janković
