= Clopton, Gloucester County, Virginia =

Unincorporated community in Virginia, United States

Coordinates: 37°20′45″N 76°32′23″W

Clopton is an unincorporated community in Gloucester County, in the U. S. state of Virginia.
