= Nicolas Walsh (physician) =

Nicolas E. Walsh is an American physiatrist. Walsh is a professor and chairman of the Department of Rehabilitation Medicine at the University of Texas Health Science Center at San Antonio.

He was appointed chairman of the American Board of Physical Medicine and Rehabilitation in 1998.

He graduated from the Air Force Academy in 1969 and later joined the Navy SEALs. He did two tours in Vietnam and received two Silver Stars and a Purple Heart for his service. He received his master's degree in biology from Marquette University and received his medical degree from the University of Colorado.
