= Chicago Muscle =

- League: Premier Basketball League
- Founded: 2011
- Dissolved: 2013
- History: Chicago Muscle (2012-2013)
- Arena: Harper College
- Location: Palatine, Illinois
- Team colors: Purple, orange, white
- Ownership: Urmil Patel, and Christopher Foltz & Company LLC.

The Chicago Muscle was a professional, minor league basketball team in the Premier Basketball League. The Muscle was set to begin play for the 2012 season. Based in Chicago, Illinois, the Muscle's home venue was Harper College in Palatine, Illinois.

The Muscle planned to be the second PBL team to play out of Chicago, following the Chicago Throwbacks which played from 2008 until folding in 2009. In the planning stages, a team called the Chicago Aztecas was set to join, but it folded before tipping off.

The team folded on March 8, 2013, according to the Illinois Secretary of State's website.
