= Nicholas Murray =

Nicholas Murray may refer to:

- Nicholas Murray (Presbyterian) (1802–1861), Moderator of the General Assembly of the Presbyterian Church
- Nicholas Murray (biographer), British biographer, poet and journalist
- Nick Murray (musician), American drummer
- Nick Murray (footballer) (born 2000), Australian rules footballer

== See also ==
- Nickolas Muray (1892–1965), Hungarian-born American photographer and saber fencer
