= Nikola Tunići =

German politician (born 1984)

Member of the Hamburg Parliament
- Incumbent
- Assumed office 26 March 2025

Personal details
- Born: 1984 (age 41–42)
- Party: Christian Democratic Union

Nikola Tunići (born 1984) is a German politician serving as a member of the Hamburg Parliament since 2025. He is the spokesperson for the food service industry of the Christian Democratic Union group in the Parliament.
