= Nicholas Hammond (ornithologist) =

English ornithologist and author

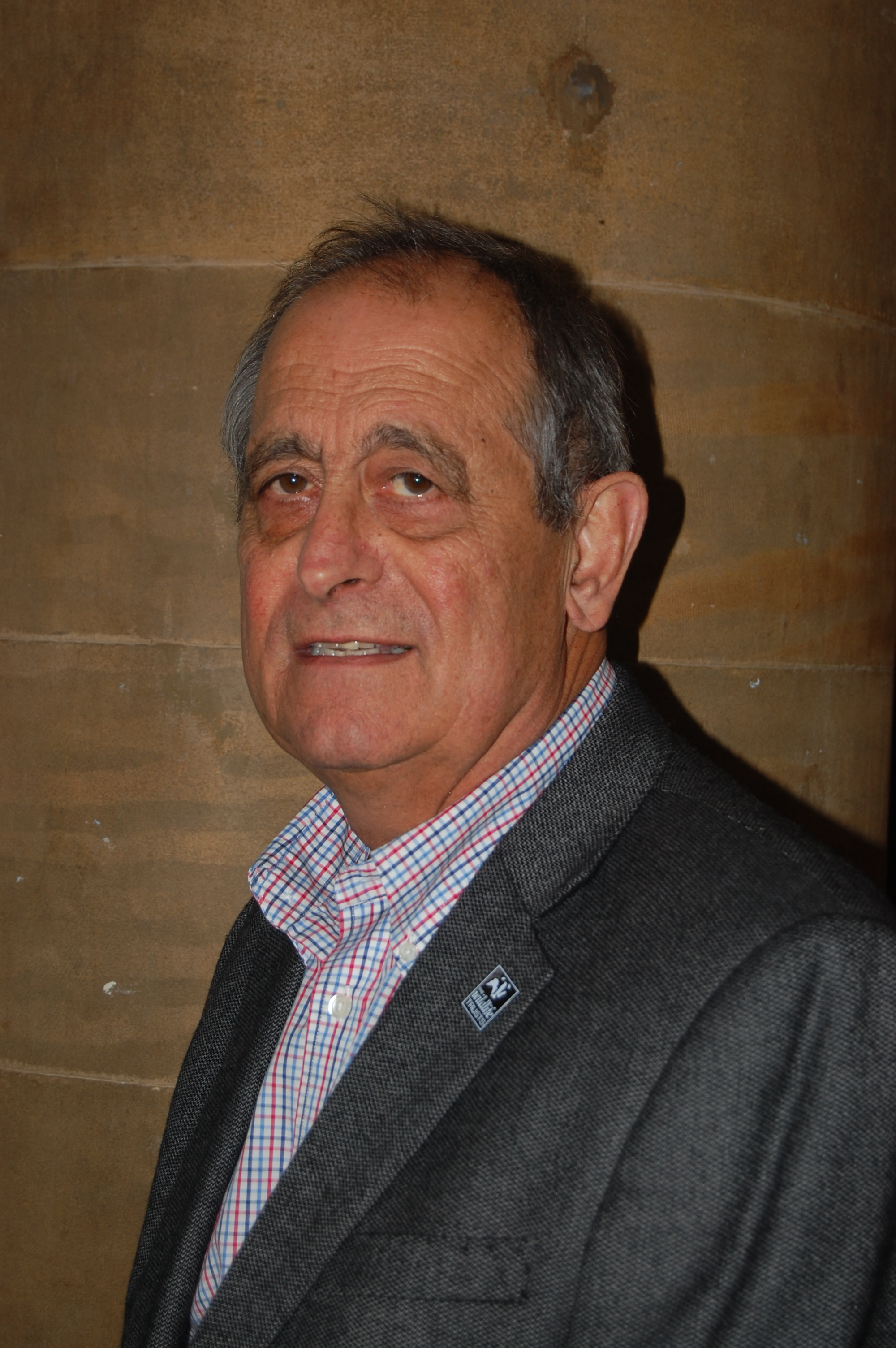
- Hammond in November 2013, wearing a Wildlife Trust lapel badge
- Other name: Nick
- Occupations: Ornithologist and author
- Known for: former director of the Wildlife Trust for Bedfordshire, Cambridgeshire and Northamptonshire
- Nicholas Hammond's voice recorded November 2013

Nicholas Hammond is an English ornithologist and author, and a former director of the Wildlife Trust for Bedfordshire, Cambridgeshire and Northamptonshire. He was editor of the Royal Society for the Protection of Birds' Birds magazine, and later its director of communications. He has written a number of books on, and speaks about, wildlife art.

== RSPB ==
Hammond undertook three stints as editor of the Royal Society for the Protection of Birds (RSPB) magazine Birds, from volume 1 number 7 – vol. 5 no. 5 (November/December 1966—September/October 1974); vol. 6 no. 6 – vol. 6 no. 9 (Spring-Winter 1977) and vol. 10 no. 3 – vol. 11 no. 1 (Autumn 1984-Spring 1986). He also served as the charity's director of communications.

== Works ==
- The Wildlife Trusts Guide to Birds. New Holland. 2002. ISBN 9781859749586.
- Birds of Britain and Europe. Pan Books. 1980. ISBN 9780330260237.
- Twentieth century wildlife artists. Woodstock, N.Y., USA: Overlook Press. 1986. ISBN 9780879512217.
- Birds Of Prey (Bird Behaviour Guide). Hamlyn. 1993. ISBN 9780540012770.
- Waders (Bird Behaviour Guide). Hamlyn. 1994. ISBN 9780600579748.
- Wildlife Art Gallery; Artists for Nature Foundation (1995). Artists for Nature in Extremadura. Wildlife Art Gallery. ISBN 9780952623601.
- Modern wildlife painting. Pica Press. 1998. ISBN 9781873403556.
- How to Identify Birds. Collins. 2006. ISBN 9780007194483.
