= Nicholas Owen =

Nicholas Owen may refer to:

- Nicholas Owen (Jesuit) (c.1562–1606), one of the Forty Martyrs of England and Wales
- Nicholas Owen (priest) (1752–1811), Welsh Anglican priest and antiquarian
- Nicholas Owen (journalist) (born 1947), BBC news presenter
- Nick Owen (born 1947), presenter for Midlands Today
- Nicholas Bond-Owen (born 1968), child actor of the 1970s and 80s
