= Clopton, Richmond, Virginia =

Unincorporated community in Virginia, US

Coordinates: 37°28′31″N 77°26′44″W

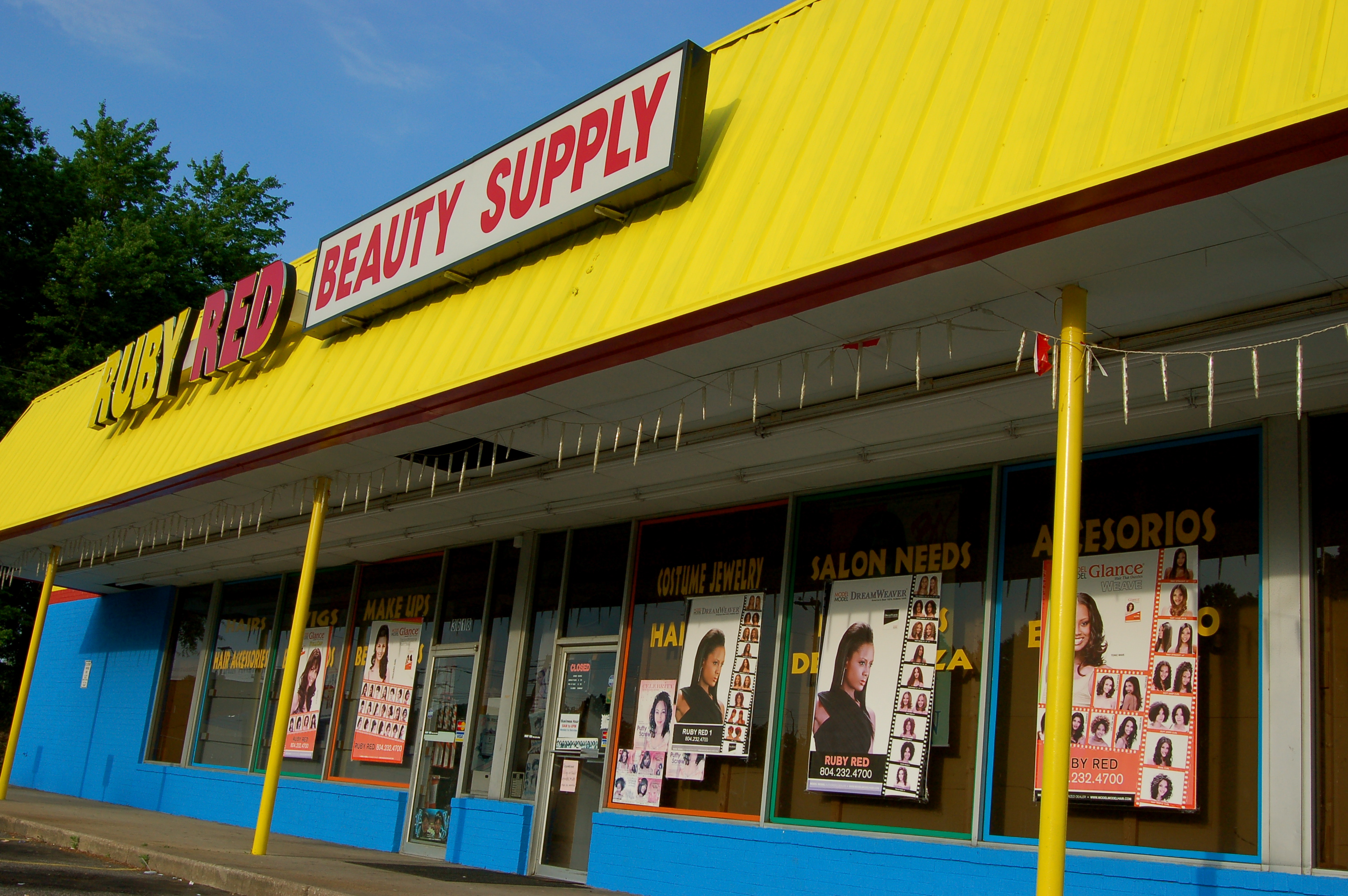
Ruby Red shop in Clopton.

Clopton is an unincorporated community in Richmond, in the U.S. state of Virginia.
