= Nicu =

Nicu is both a masculine Romanian given name and a Romanian surname. Notable people with the name include:

Given name:

- Nicu Ceaușescu (1951–1996), Romanian communist
- Nicu Constantin (1938–2009), Romanian actor
- Nicu Constantinescu (1840–1905), Romanian politician
- Nicu Covaci (born 1947), Romanian painter and musician
- Nicu Paleru (born 1973), Romanian Gypsy musician
- Nicu Porsena (Ionescu) (1892–1971), Romanian writer
- Nicu Stoian (born 1957), Romanian volleyball player
- Nicu Vlad (born 1963), Romanian weightlifter

Surname:

- Epaminonda Nicu (born 1979), Romanian footballer
- Maximilian Nicu (born 1982), German-Romanian footballer

== See also ==
- Nicu (disambiguation)
