= Nicholas Jackson =

Nicholas Jackson may refer to:

- Nicholas Jackson (editor) (born 1987), American author, writer, and magazine editor
- Nicholas Lane Jackson (1849–1937), English sports administrator and author
- Nicholas Jackson, ring name of Nicholas Massie (born 1989), American wrestler of The Young Bucks
- Sir Nicholas Jackson, 3rd Baronet (born 1934), British composer and organist
- Nicholas Jackson, after whom Jacksonville, Arkansas, United States, is named
- Nicolas Jackson (born 2001), Senegalese footballer

== See also ==
- Nicola Jackson
