= Nicholas Clapton =

English singer (born 1955)

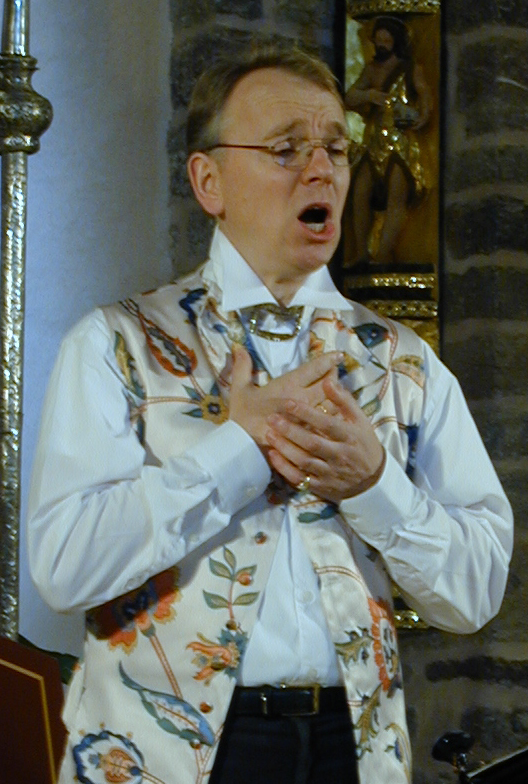
- Nicholas Clapton performing in Kotor, Montenegro 2001

Background information
- Born: September 16, 1955 (age 71)

Nicholas Clapton (born 16 September 1955) is an English countertenor, singing-teacher and author.

== Life and career ==
Clapton was born in Worcester, England, and read music at Magdalen College, Oxford. He studied singing with David Mason and Diane Forlano, and made his professional debut at the Wigmore Hall in 1984. In the following year, he was a double prize-winner at the Concurso "Francisco Viñas" in Barcelona, and in 1987 won the English Song Award.

Clapton is particularly known for countertenor roles in contemporary opera, the heroic castrato repertoire of the eighteenth century, and romantic art song (in partnership with the pianist Jennifer Partridge). He has performed in major opera houses and concert halls around the world, and has given over forty world premières (including six operas).

Unusual events in his career have included: a Purcell concert in that composer's tercentenary year in a former Palace of Culture in Siberia; playing three different reincarnations of the great castrato Farinelli; and accompanying himself on the castanets in Simon Holt's Six Caprices. In concert and oratorio, as well as major works by Bach and Handel, Clapton's repertoire includes Wagner's Wesendonck Lieder, Elgar's Sea Pictures, Vaughan Williams' Five Mystical Songs and the Verdi Requiem.

Having taught for several years at Trinity College of Music in London, Nicholas Clapton was also a professor of Singing at the Royal Academy of Music until 2015. He gave classes at the Dartington International Summer School for over twenty years, and until 2013 was a visiting professor at the Zeneakadémia in Budapest. He has also taught in Prague, Belgrade and the Netherlands. His 2004 biography of Alessandro Moreschi was chosen by the Tablet magazine as one of its Books of the Year for 2005; (it was re-issued in a larger second edition as Moreschi and the Voice of the Castrato in 2008). In June 2005 Clapton became a Doctor of Liberal Arts of the Liszt Ferenc Music University, Budapest. In 2006 he presented the documentary Castrato for BBC Four television, and curated the exhibition Handel and the Castrati at the Handel House Museum, London. His second book, Budapest, City of Music, was published in March 2009.

== Discography ==
- Gerald Barry: The Intelligence Park (NMC) and The Triumph of Beauty and Deceit (Largo)
- Maurice Duruflé: Requiem (CRD)
- Nicola LeFanu: Canción de la Luna (Naxos)
- Nicola Porpora: Cantatas (Hungaroton)
