= Nicholas Nikolayevich =

Nicholas Nikolayevich, Grand Duke Nicholas Nikolayevich of Russia, and similar terms, may refer to:

- Grand Duke Nicholas Nikolaevich of Russia (1831–1891)
- Grand Duke Nicholas Nikolaevich of Russia (1856–1929), his son
