= Carew =

Carew may refer to:

- Carew (surname)
- Carew, Pembrokeshire, in Wales
  - Carew (electoral ward), a ward coterminous with the Welsh community
- Carew, New Zealand, in the Ashburton District
- Carew, South Australia, see Tatiara District Council#Geography
- Carew, West Virginia, in the United States

== See also ==
- Carew Park F.C., in Limerick, Ireland
- Carew Tower, a tower in Ohio, United States
- Seaton Carew, a village in Hartlepool, County Durham, England
- Carew & Co (Bangladesh) Ltd, spirit producer in Bangladesh
