= Nicholas Adam =

French linguist and writer

Nicholas Adam (1716–1792) was a French linguist and writer.

Born in Paris, he achieved distinction by authoring a grammar book which bore the title: La vraie manière d'apprendre une langue quelconque, vivante ou morte, par le moyen de la langue française ("True manner of learning an unspecified, living or dead language, by the means of the French language"). It consisted of five grammars: French, Latin, Italian, German, and English. He published another book which he called "Les quatre chapitres", on reason, self-love, love of our neighbour, and love of virtue; writing it in good and bad Latin, and good and bad French. He has also left many translations of classic works, among them, Alexander Pope's "Essay on Man", Samuel Johnson's "Rasselas", Joseph Addison's "Cato", Edward Young's "Night Thoughts", etc. He was a favourite of Choiseul, who sent him as French ambassador to Venice. It is said that he knew all the languages of Europe and possessed a rare gift of communicating his knowledge to others.
