= Mikołaj =

Mikołaj is the Polish cognate of given name Nicholas, used both as a given name and a surname. It may refer to people:

In Polish (or Polish-Lithuanian) nobility:

- Mikołaj Kamieniecki, Polish nobleman and the first Grand Hetman of the Crown
- Mikołaj Krzysztof "the Orphan" Radziwiłł, Polish-Lithuanian lord
- Mikołaj Mielecki, Polish nobleman and politician
- Mikołaj Ostroróg, Polish nobleman
- Mikołaj Potocki, member of the Polish nobility, magnate, and the Field Hetman of the Crown
- Mikołaj "the Black" Radziwiłł, noble of the Grand Duchy of Lithuania, Palatine of Vilnius, and Grand Chancellor of Lithuania
- Mikołaj "the Red" Radziwiłł, Polish-Lithuanian lord, Palatine of Vilnius, Grand Chancellor, and Grand Hetman of Lithuania
- Mikołaj VII Radziwiłł, Polish-Lithuanian lord, and Lord Grand Chamberlain of Lithuania
- Mikołaj Sienicki, notable member of the landed nobility of the Kingdom of Poland
- Mikołaj Szyszkowski, bishop of Warmia from 1633 until his death in 1643
- Mikołaj Zebrzydowski, Palatine of Lublin, Grand Marshal of the Crown, and Palatine of Kraków

In Polish music:

- Aga Mikolaj (1971–2021), stage name of Agnieszka Beata Mikołajczyk, a Polish operatic soprano
- Mikołaj Gomółka, Polish composer
- Mikołaj Radomski, Polish composer
- Mikołaj Zieleński, Polish composer

In Polish literature:

- Mikołaj Hussowski, Belarusian and Polish Renaissance writer
- Mikołaj Rej, one of the best known Polish poets and writers of the Renaissance

In Cinema:

- Mikołaj Kopeć, Polish director based in France. Co-creator of production house Têtes Parlantes.

In other fields:

- Mikołaj Kopernik, usually translated as Nicolaus Copernicus, Renaissance mathematician and astronomer, known for formulating heliocentrism
- Mikołaj Kubica (1945–2020), Polish gymnast
- Mikołaj Sieniawski, notable Polish magnate, military commander, and prominent politician
- Mikołaj Trąba, Polish Roman Catholic priest, Royal Notary, Vice-Chancellor of the Crown, bishop of Halicz, and archbishop of Gniezno
