= Brixton =

District in the London Borough of Lambeth, in England

Coordinates: 51°27′27″N 00°07′03″W

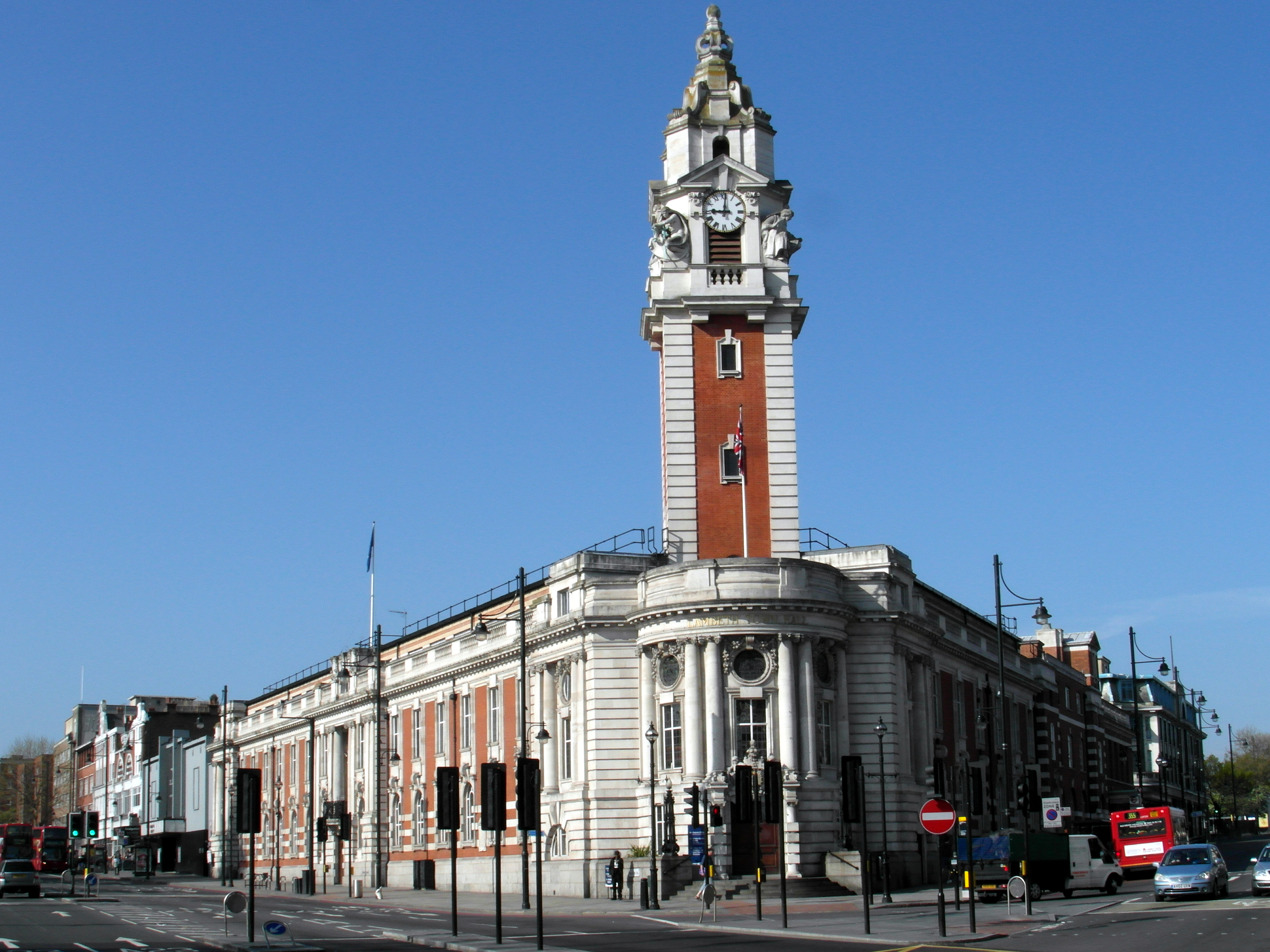
- Lambeth Town Hall

- Location within Greater London
- Population: 78,536 (2011 census)
- OS grid reference: TQ315755
  - Charing Cross: 3.8 mi (6.1 km) N
- London borough: Lambeth
- Ceremonial county: Greater London
- Region: London
- Country: England
- Sovereign state: United Kingdom
- Post town: LONDON
- Postcode district: SW2, SW9
- Dialling code: 020
- Police: Metropolitan
- Fire: London
- Ambulance: London
- UK Parliament: Clapham and Brixton Hill; Dulwich and West Norwood
- London Assembly: Lambeth and Southwark

Brixton is an area of South London, part of the London Borough of Lambeth, England. The area is identified in the London Plan as one of 35 major centres in Greater London. Brixton experienced a rapid rise in population during the 19th century as communications with central London improved.

Brixton is mainly residential, though includes Brixton Market and a substantial retail sector. It is a multi-ethnic community, with a large percentage of its population of Afro-Caribbean descent. It lies within Inner London and is bordered by Stockwell, Clapham, Streatham, Camberwell, Tulse Hill, Balham and Herne Hill. The district houses the main offices of Lambeth London Borough Council.

Brixton is 2.7 mi (4.3 km) south-southeast from the geographical centre of London (measuring to a point near Brixton Underground station on the Victoria line).

== History ==
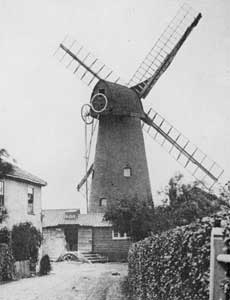
Ashby's Mill, Brixton, also known as Brixton Windmill in 1864

A map showing the Brixton ward of Lambeth Metropolitan Borough as it appeared in 1916.

=== Toponymy ===
The name Brixton is thought to originate from Brixistane, meaning the stone of Brixi, a Saxon lord. Brixi is thought to have erected a boundary stone to mark the meeting place of the ancient Brixton hundred court of Surrey. The location is unknown but is thought to be at the top of Brixton Hill, at a road known at the time as Bristow or Brixton Causeway, long before any settlement in the area.

=== Until the mid-19th century ===
Brixton marks the rise from the marshes in the north of the ancient parish of Lambeth up to the hills of Upper Norwood and Streatham. At the time the River Effra flowed from its source in Upper Norwood through Herne Hill to Brixton. At Brixton the river was crossed by low bridges for Roman roads to the south coast, now Brixton Road and Clapham Road. The main roads were connected through a network of medieval country lanes, such as Acre Lane, Coldharbour Lane, Brixton Water Lane and Lyham Road, formerly Black Lane. It was only at the end of the 18th century that villages and settlements formed around Brixton, as the original woodland was gradually reduced until the area was covered in farmland and market gardens known for game and strawberries.

The area remained undeveloped until the beginning of the 19th century, the main settlements being near Stockwell, Brixton Hill and Coldharbour Lane. With the opening of Vauxhall Bridge in 1816, improved access to Central London led to a process of suburban development. The largest single development, and one of the last in suburban character, was Angell Town, laid out in the 1850s on the east side of Brixton Road, and so named after a family that owned land in Lambeth from the late 17th century until well into the 20th. As bridges were built across the Thames in the early 19th century those working in the City of London and the West End moved to south London. The first development was in Washway, now Brixton Road. With the enclosing of the Manor of Lambeth, owned by the Archbishop of Canterbury, in 1806 and the opening of Vauxhall Bridge in 1816, terraced houses and detached villas started to line the main roads. The Rush Common enclosure stipulations dictated that houses had to be set back from the main roads, allowing for generous gardens. St Matthew's Church on part of the former common land was consecrated in 1824. The parish of St Matthew Brixton, one of five subdivisions of the ancient Lambeth parish, stretched from Camberwell Green in the northeast, to Clapham Road in the northwest, to the outer edge of Brockwell Park in the southeast and to Kingswood Road in the southwest.

Ashby's Mill, one of the few surviving windmills in London, was built in 1816, just off Brixton Hill and surrounded by houses built during Brixton's Victorian expansion. The Surrey House of Correction, later Brixton prison, was established in 1819.

As part of the Reform Act 1832 the expanding area of London was given representation with the creation of new parliamentary boroughs covering the metropolitan area. Only the part of Brixton north of St Matthew's Church became part of the Lambeth parliamentary borough, reflecting the still semi-rural nature of the southern part of the area. The population of Brixton was 10,175 in 1841, about 10% of the parish of Lambeth. In twenty years the population of both had doubled.

=== Victorian expansion ===
When the London sewerage system was constructed during the mid-19th century, its designer Sir Joseph Bazalgette incorporated flows from the River Effra into his 'high-level interceptor sewer', also known as the Effra sewer.

Brixton was connected to central London by rail on 25 August 1862 when Brixton and South Stockwell railway station was opened by the London, Chatham and Dover Railway on the line from Victoria. On 13 August 1866 the London, Brighton & South Coast Railway opened Loughborough Park railway station with connections to London Bridge and the following year to Victoria. With the arrival of the railways a building boom set in. Brixton was transformed into a middle class suburb between the 1860s and 1890s and Brixton developed into a major shopping centre. The first purpose-built department store, Bon Marché (Brixton), was opened on Brixton Road in 1877 and Electric Avenue was one of the first shopping arcades to have electric lighting. The now famous Brixton Market began in Atlantic Road and was moved to Station Road in the 1920s to ease traffic congestion.

In 1881 the population of Brixton was 62,837, now home to a quarter of the parish of Lambeth.

A prominent building on Brixton High Street (at 472–488 Brixton Road) is Morleys, an independent department store established in the 1880s. In this time, large expensive houses were constructed along the main roads in Brixton, which were converted into flats and boarding houses at the start of the 20th century as the middle classes were replaced by an influx of the working classes.

=== Before World War II ===
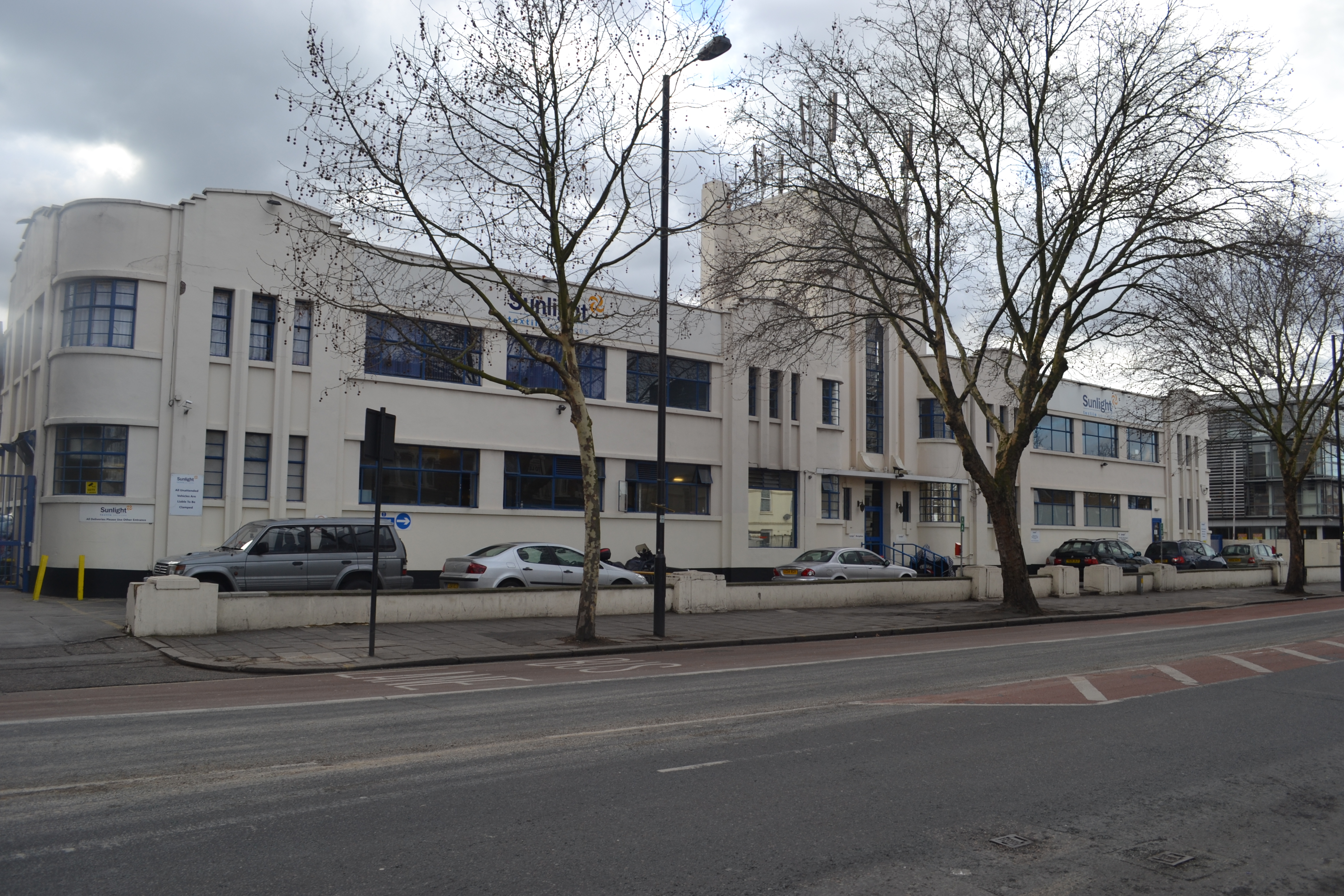
The Sunlight Laundry, Brixton

By 1925, Brixton attracted thousands of new people. It housed the largest shopping centre in south London at the time, as well as a thriving market, cinemas, pubs and a theatre. In the 1920s, Brixton was the shopping capital of south London with three large department stores and some of the earliest branches of what are now Britain's major national retailers. Today, Brixton Road is the main shopping area, fusing into Brixton Market.

On the western boundary of Brixton with Clapham stands the Sunlight Laundry, an Art Deco factory building. Designed by architect F.E. Simpkins and erected in 1937, this is one of the few Art Deco buildings that is still owned by the firm that commissioned it and is still used for its original purpose.

The Brixton area was bombed during World War II, contributing to a severe housing crisis, which in turn led to urban decay. This was followed by slum clearances and the building of council housing.

=== 1948: Windrush generation ===
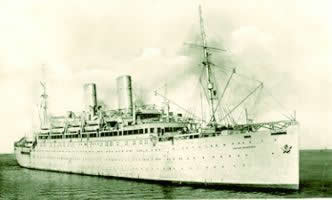
The Empire Windrush which brought immigrants from the Caribbean to Tilbury in 1948.

In the 1940s and 1950s, many immigrants, particularly from the West Indies and Ireland, settled in Brixton, with it becoming the "unofficial reception centre" for those arriving in London. By 1959, there were around 7,000 non-White residents in the area.

The first wave of immigrants (492 individuals) who formed the British African-Caribbean community arrived in 1948 at Tilbury Docks on the HMT Empire Windrush from Jamaica and were temporarily housed in the Clapham South deep shelter. The nearest Labour Exchange (Jobcentre) was on Coldharbour Lane, Brixton, and the new arrivals spread out into local accommodation.

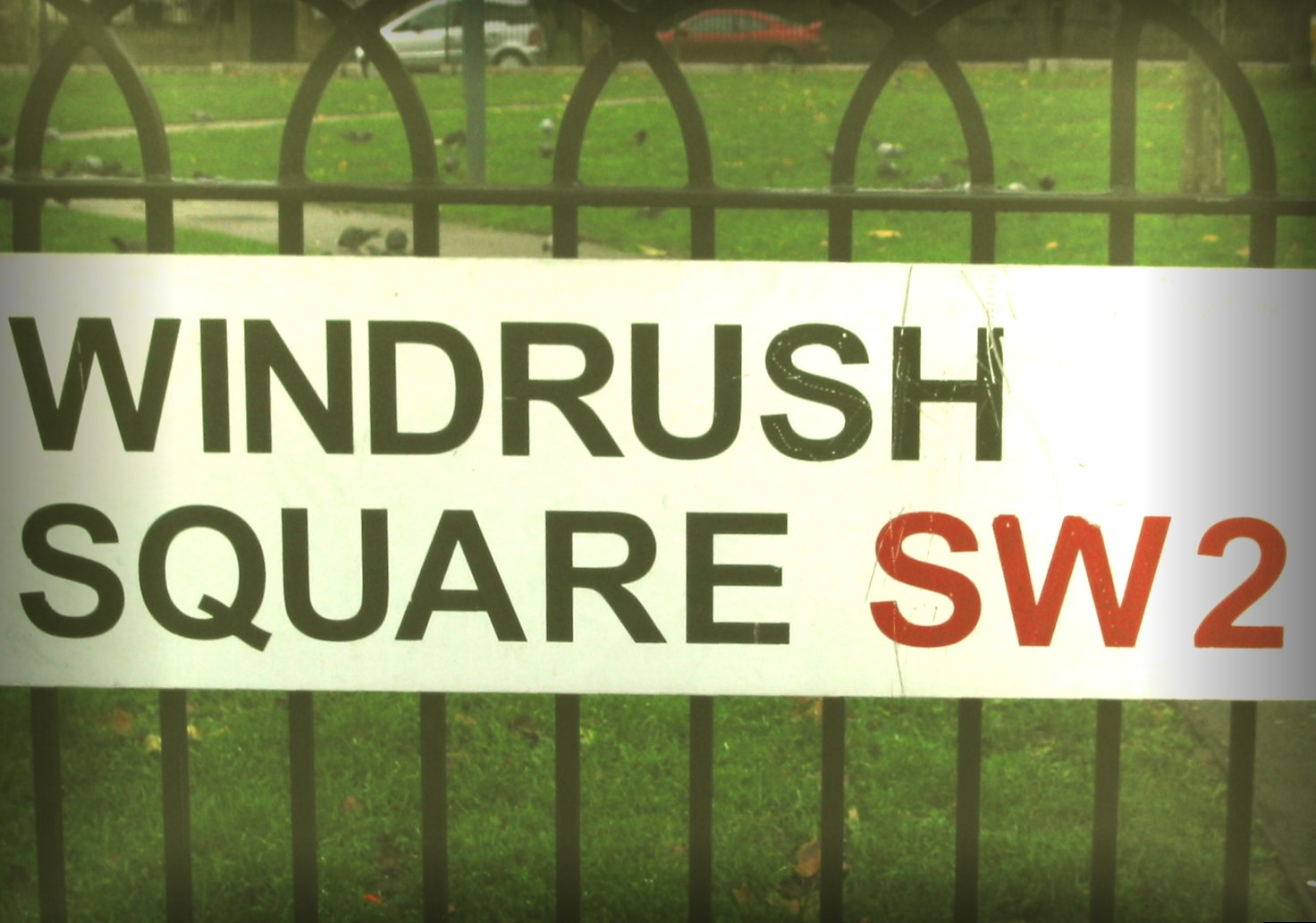
Windrush Square street sign

Many immigrants only intended to stay in Britain for a few years, but although a number returned to the Caribbean, the majority remained to settle permanently. The arrival of the passengers has become an important landmark in the history of modern Britain, and the image of West Indians filing off its gangplank has come to symbolise the beginning of modern British multicultural society. In 1998 the area in front of Brixton Library was renamed "Windrush Square" to mark the 50th anniversary of the arrival of the Windrush.

=== 1980s: Riots after police actions and Scarman Report ===
Brixton was the scene of riots in April 1981 at a time when Brixton underwent deep social and economic problems—high unemployment, high crime, poor housing, no amenities—in a predominantly African-Caribbean community. The Metropolitan Police began Operation Swamp 81 at the beginning of April, aimed at reducing street crime, largely through the repeated use of the so-called sus law, which allowed police officers to stop and search any individual on the grounds of mere "suspicion" of possible wrongdoing. Plain clothes police officers were dispatched into Brixton, and within five days almost 1,000 people were stopped and searched under this law. There was intense local indignation at this, since the vast majority of those stopped by the police were young black men. The riot resulted in almost 279 injuries to police and 45 injuries to members of the public, more than a hundred vehicles were burned (including 56 police vehicles), and almost 150 buildings were damaged, with 30 burned. There were 82 arrests. Reports suggested that up to 5,000 people were involved in the riot.

Following the 1981 Brixton riot the Government commissioned a public inquiry into the riot headed by Lord Scarman. The subsequent Scarman report was published in November 1981 and found unquestionable evidence of the disproportionate and indiscriminate use of 'stop and search' powers by the police against black people. The report made a number of recommendations and led to a new code for police behaviour in the Police and Criminal Evidence Act 1984 and the creation of an independent Police Complaints Authority in 1985. The 1999 Macpherson Report, an investigation into the murder of Stephen Lawrence, found that recommendations of the 1981 Scarman report had been ignored and concluded that the police force was "institutionally racist".

=== 1990s ===
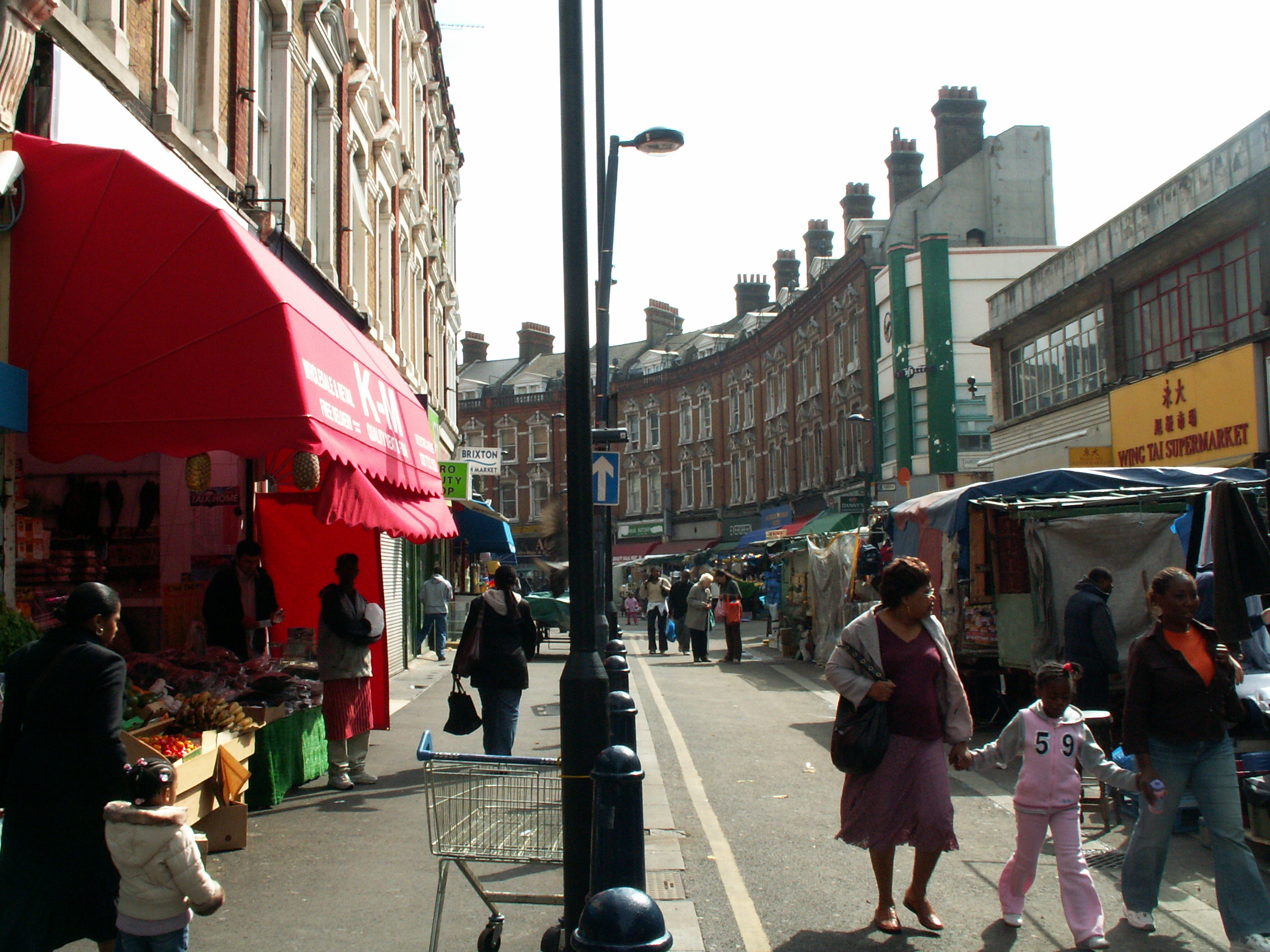
Electric Avenue, inspiration of the Eddy Grant single, part of Brixton Market, and site of the 1999 bombing

John Major's childhood roots in the area were used in a campaign poster leading up to the 1992 election: "What does the Conservative Party offer a working class kid from Brixton? They made him Prime Minister."

The 1995 riots were sparked by the death of a black man, Wayne Douglas, in police custody and occurred in an atmosphere of discontent about the gentrification of Brixton.

In April 1999, Brixton Market was the site of the first of three attacks known as the London nail bombings. The other two, which followed within a fortnight, were in Brick Lane, the heart of East London's Bangladeshi community, and the Admiral Duncan pub in Soho, frequented predominantly by the gay community. In the Brixton attack, 48 people were injured. The bomber was caught after the third attack; the BBC reported that he intended to ignite a race war across Britain with his bombing campaign. He was convicted of murder and given six concurrent life sentences.

=== 2000s: regeneration vs. gentrification ===
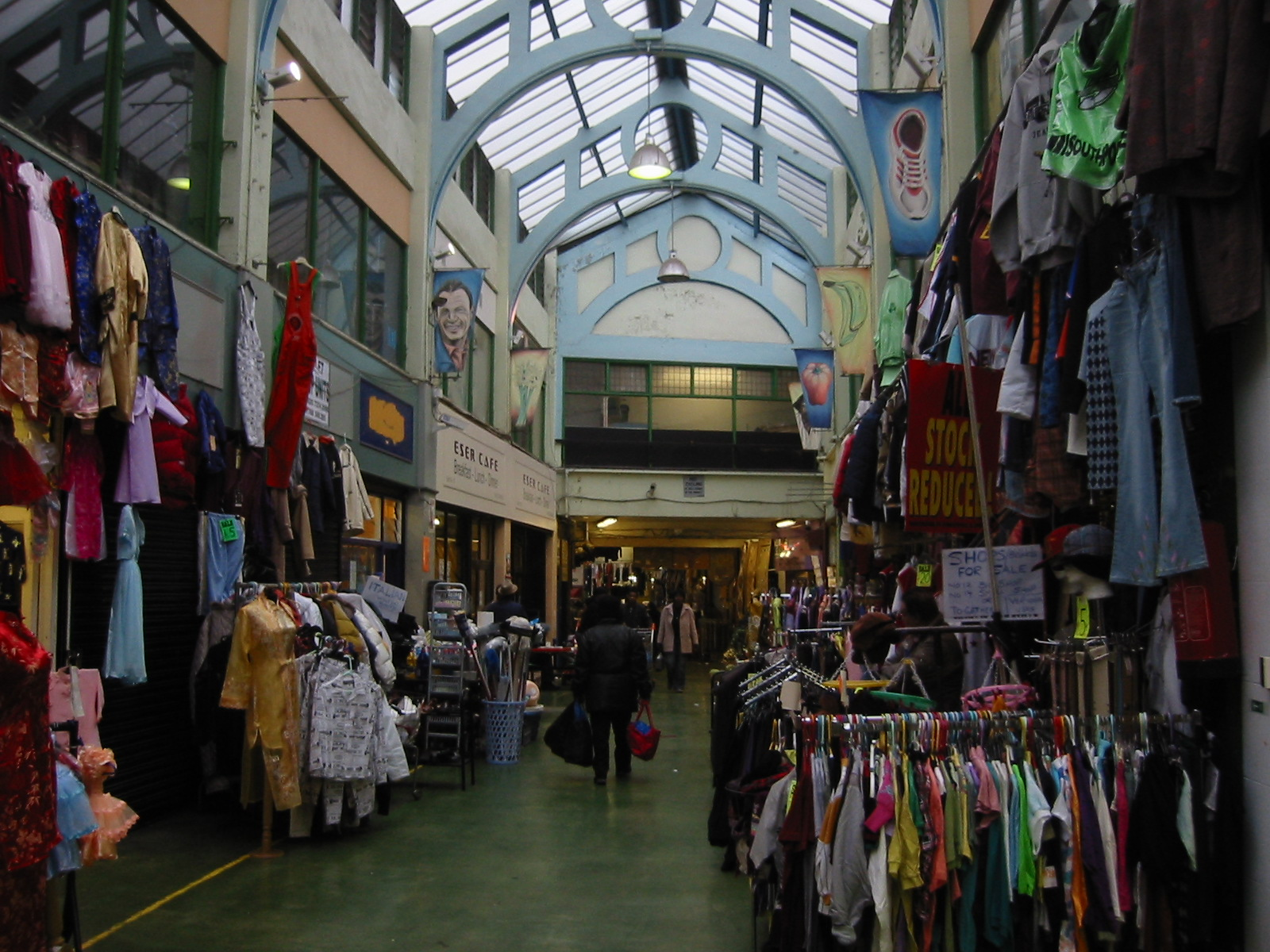
Brixton Market

It is debated whether the area's 21st-century renaissance should be deemed regeneration or gentrification. Some say wealthy and middle-class people are taking advantage of the area's location and the thriving bohemian art scene, while others argue that the area is undergoing exciting regeneration. In recent years, Brixton has hosted a regular farmers' market on Station Road, as well as pop-up restaurants and shops. New art galleries, delicatessens, bars, cafes, and vintage clothing stores, particularly in and around Brixton Village Market have also opened, which some believe is gentrifying the area in a similar way to that in nearby Clapham.

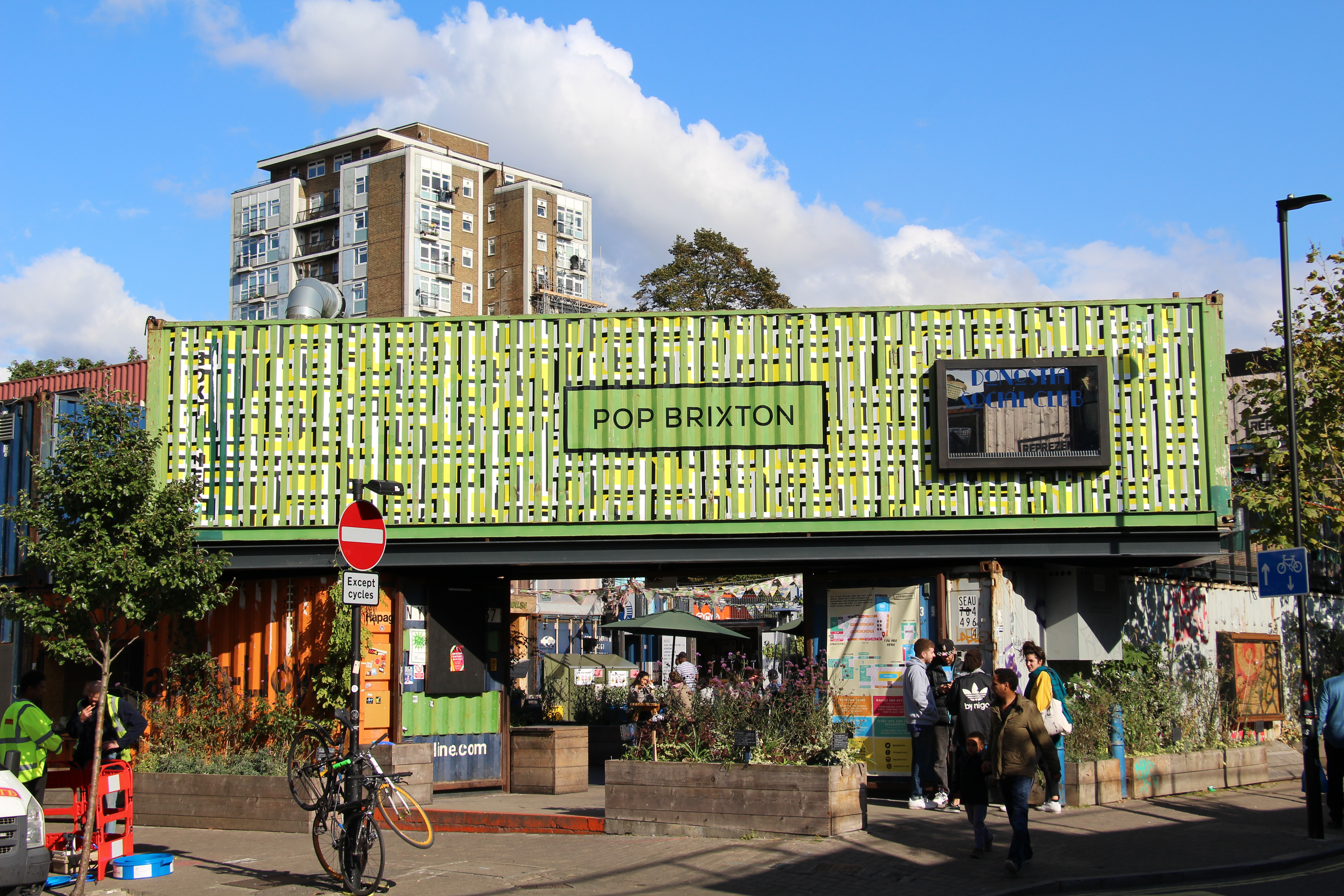
Pop Brixton

Pop Brixton exemplifies the ongoing discussion about regeneration. Originally created as a community project, opinion is divided over whether Pop fulfils its intentions of being part of the local community, with some arguing that Pop is seen as just another tourist and retail attraction, and that the council did not meaningfully engage with Brixton residents. Others have welcomed its arrival for its entrepreneurial approach and benefiting start-ups, and that it brings people into the area which has benefited trade and its popularity.

In April 2015, a Reclaim Brixton protest was held by local residents and activists opposing gentrification.

In March 2016, a campaign to save the businesses that occupy the railway arches commenced, with long-running local businesses being forced out due to rent-rises. The council passed the plans for Network Rail to refurbish them in August.

In May 2019, plans for a 20-storey tower block providing office space were unveiled by Taylor McWilliams, a Texan property developer whose company Hondo Enterprises had bought Brixton Market in 2018. This plan drew a large opposition from the local community and campaign groups, already concerned with the threat of eviction of a popular local supermarket. Despite a petition and overwhelming opposition, council planners approved the development on 3 November 2020. However, following a long campaign by protestors, the developer withdrew the planning application in July 2023.

2023 saw the council begin the public consultation for the regeneration of 6 Canterbury Crescent (International House) and 49 Brixton Station Road (Pop Brixton).

== Transition town and local currency ==
Brixton was one of the first inner-city based 'Transition town' projects in the UK. Brockwell Park hosts the now annual Urban Green Fair, first held in summer 2007.

=== Brixton pound ===
The Brixton pound was first trialled at Transition Town Brixton's "Local Economy Day" on 19 June 2008. It was then launched on 17 September 2009 by Transition Town Brixton. The Brixton pound is a local currency that is available as an alternative to sterling. The first trading day of the Brixton pound was on 18 September 2009 with 80 local businesses accepting the currency.

The Brixton pound aims to boost the local economy and build a mutual support system amongst independent businesses by tying local shoppers to local shops and by encouraging local shops to source goods and services locally. The notes are available in B£1, B£5, B£10, and B£20 denominations and depict local celebrities such as the community activist Olive Morris and the environmentalist James Lovelock. Lambeth Council has endorsed the project, which the New Economics Foundation helped to develop.

On 29 September 2011, the Brixton pound launched an electronic version of the currency where users can pay by text message. A second issue of the paper currency was launched, featuring a new set of well-known people with Brixton connections: On the B£1, the Black Cultural Archives founder Len Garrison, on the B£5, NBA basketball player Luol Deng (the reverse was inspired by the Ark Evelyn Grace Academy), David Bowie on the B£10 and World War II secret agent Violette Szabo on the B£20.

The reverse of the notes, designed by a Brixton creative agency This Ain't Rock'n'Roll, feature notable local landmarks such as the Stockwell Skatepark, public art on Electric Avenue, Nuclear Dawn (one of the Brixton murals), and the Stirling Prize-winning Ark Evelyn Grace Academy. All four notes feature a design motif inspired by Coldharbour Lane's Southwyck House (or "Barrier Block").

In 2015, to celebrate the Brixton pound's fifth anniversary, the Turner Prize-winning artist Jeremy Deller was commissioned to design a limited-edition B£5 note. It was described as "psychedelic and political", with the front featuring bright colors and the back with a quotation from Karl Marx's Das Kapital ("Capital is money, capital is commodities...By virtue of it being value, it has acquired the occult ability to add value to itself. It brings forth living offspring, or, at the least, lays golden eggs.")

Other towns and cities in the UK that have used their own currency include the city of Bristol, Totnes in Devon, Stroud in Gloucestershire and Lewes in Sussex.

== Housing ==
=== Housing estates ===
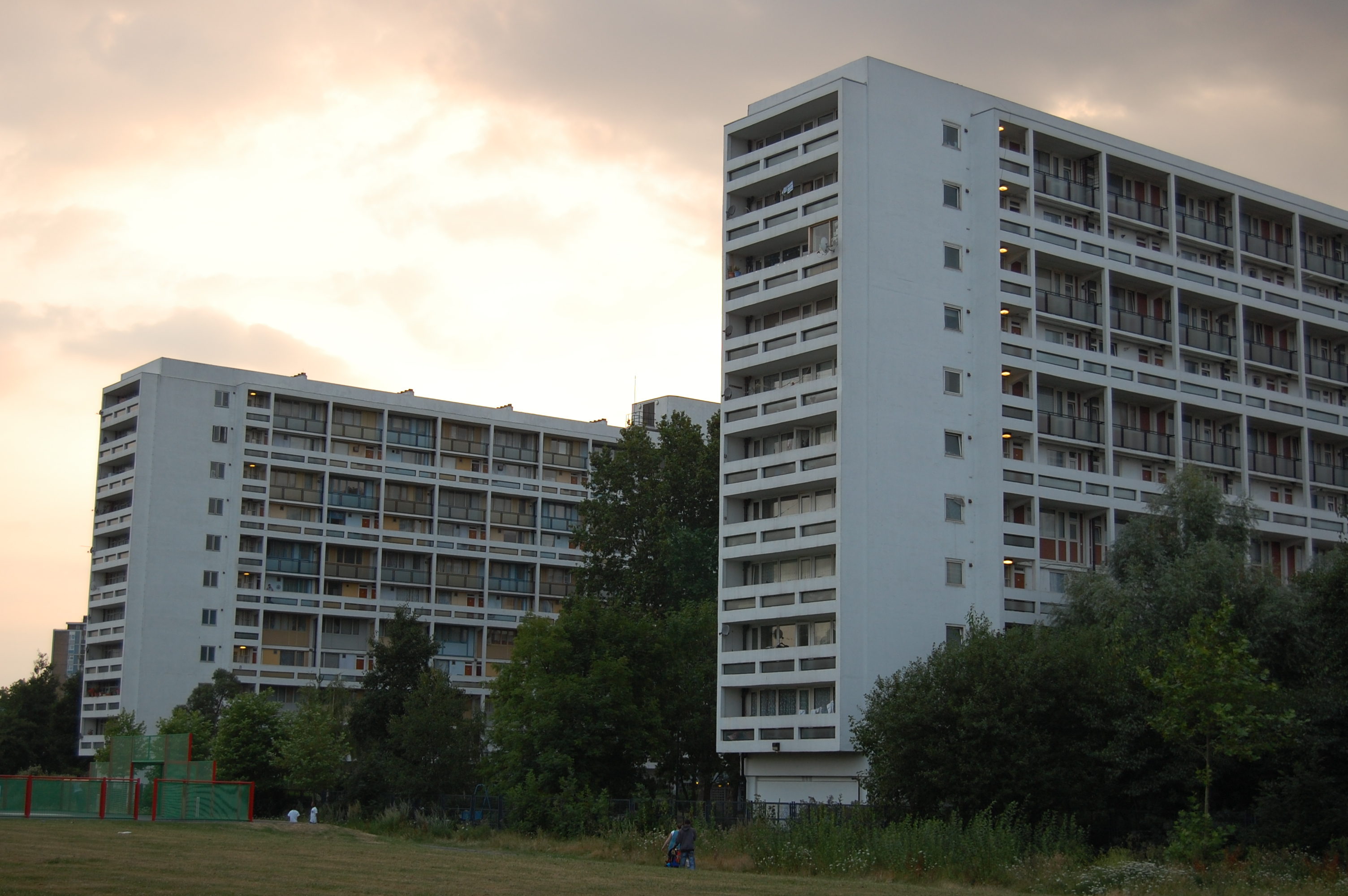
The Loughborough Estate in the east of the area

Brixton is home to several particularly large housing estates: Stockwell Park Estate off Stockwell and Brixton Roads respectively; Myatt's Fields South and North off Vassall Road; Angell Town off Brixton Road on the boundary with Camberwell; Cowley on Cowley and Vassall Roads, Loughborough in the centre of Brixton, Tulse Hill estate, Somerleyton estate and Moorlands Estate, situated off Coldharbour Lane. There are also smaller estates such as Blenheim Gardens, Caldwell Gardens, Church Manor and Hertford. These estates account for a large part of the Brixton residence.

Estates like the Stockwell Park Estate and the Angell Town Estate were originally designed to accommodate high-level walkways which were envisaged to link the whole of Brixton. The ground-floor garages of these estates have proved to be a major security problem. The Somerleyton Estate is dominated by Southwyck House (known locally as "Barrier Block"), a large horseshoe-shaped brick and concrete 1970s structure that backs onto Coldharbour Lane. The 176-apartment block was originally constructed in this shape to provide a noise barrier against Ringway 1, a proposed inner-London motorway that was planned to pass through Brixton and Camberwell, later abandoned.

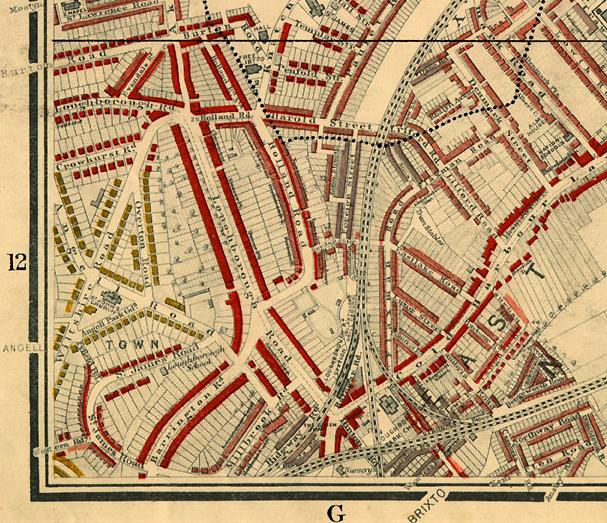
Map of Brixton in 1889, showing Coldharbour Lane, Angell Town and Loughborough Road. Published in Life and Labour of the People in London by Charles Booth. The red areas are "middle-class, well-to-do" and the yellow areas are "upper-middle and upper classes, wealthy".

Some housing estates have been linked with urban decay and crime. New gates and iron bars have been constructed for the Loughborough Estate around Loughborough Road and Minet Road in response to a number of murders around the estate. The Loughborough Estate is home to more than 3,000 families and a mix of 1940s low-rise buildings and 1960s/1970s tower blocks and houses. Problems of urban decay have been reported around Loughborough Junction, the catchment area for Loughborough Estate, the Angell Town Estate and the Moorlands Estate.

=== Victorian buildings ===
Brixton still features some grand Victorian housing.

=== Brixton Market ===
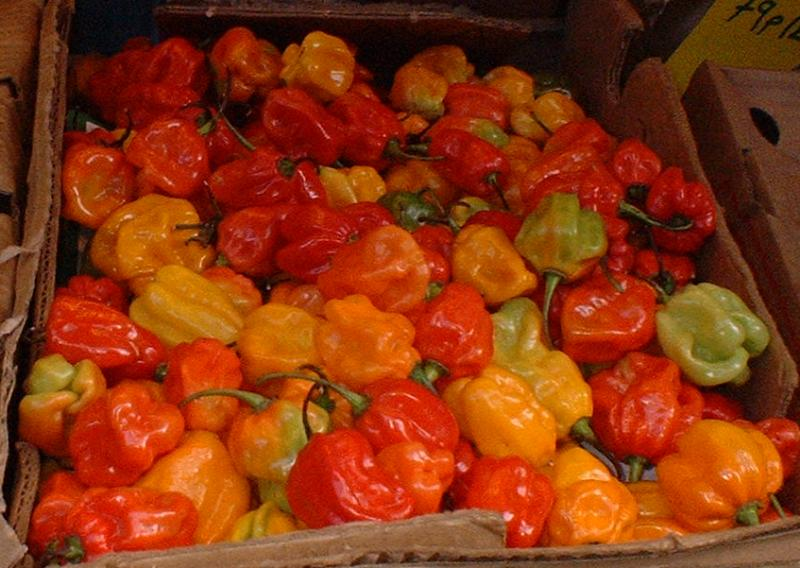
Scotch bonnet peppers imported from the Caribbean on sale at Brixton Market. The peppers are a key ingredient of "Jerk" dishes (Caribbean cuisine).

Brixton Market is open every day, selling a range of African-Caribbean products and reflects other communities in the local area with Indian and Vietnamese supermarkets and South American butchers amongst the shops and stalls. London Farmers' Markets opened a farmers market on Brixton Station Road in September 2009. It is open every Sunday from 9.30am to 2pm.

== Culture ==
=== Brixton murals ===
After the riots in 1981 a series of murals were funded by the council. The murals portray nature, politics, community and ideas. The surviving murals include the Brixton Academy Mural (Stockwell Park Walk) by Stephen Pusey (1982) showing a mixed group of young people, intended to portray the natural harmony that could be found between children of mixed backgrounds in the local schools.

Recent contributions towards Brixton's mural tradition include the portrait of Michael Johns on Popes Road by Dreph, created as part of Brixton Design Trail in September 2017 and the temporary installation of "Remain, Thriving" by Njideka Akunyili Crosby at Brixton tube station, a commission by Art on the Underground. In 2018 Dreph completed a large mural depicting Michelle Obama in Dorrell Place.

=== Entertainment ===
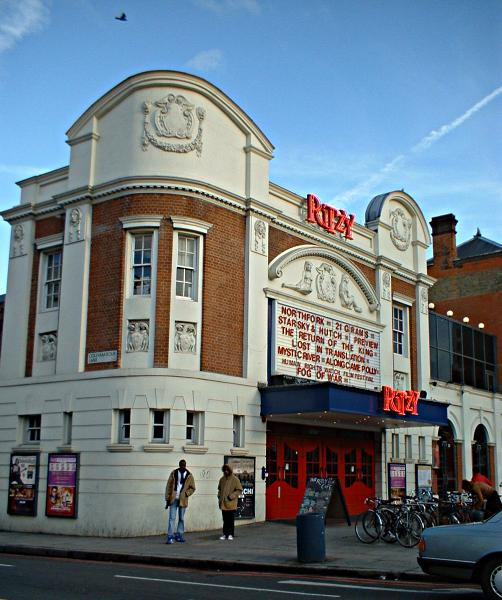
The Ritzy Cinema

The Ritzy Cinema is a formerly independent cinema now owned by Picturehouse Cinemas. The building was designed as the Electric Pavilion in 1910 by E. C. Homer and Lucas, one of England's first purpose-built cinemas.

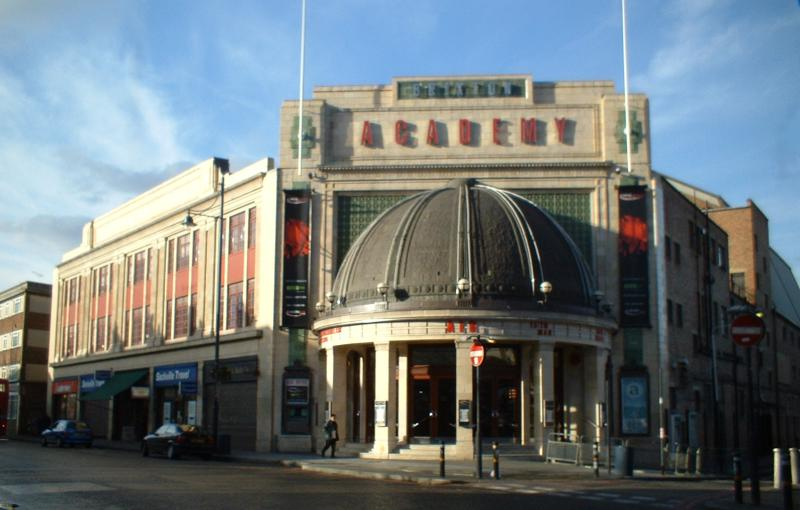
Brixton Academy

Brixton has a significant clubbing and live music scene. Large venues include Brixton Academy and Electric Brixton. A range of smaller venues such as The Windmill, Brixton Jamm, and Phonox are a major part of London's live music scene. The Brixton Splash is an annual one-day street party held since 2006. The event is community run, showcasing local talent and celebrating the cultural diversity and history of Brixton.

=== Record shops ===
Brixton has had a number of popular record shops. Desmond's Hip City on Atlantic Road existed from the 1970s until its closure in 1989. A record by the band Skydiggers; Desmond's Hip City is named after the shop. In 2018, filmmaker Molly Dineen made a film about the owner of Blacker Dread Muzik Store called Being Blacker. Brixton's current record shops include Supertone Records (opened in 1983) selling soundsystem reggae and Container Records which sells dance music.

=== Sport ===
Brixton is also home to a 1970s purpose-built skatepark, named Stockwell Skatepark, its own Dominoes team, the Brixton Immortals started by the community's Windrush Generation and bicycle co-operative Brixton Cycles.

=== Media ===
Brixton is served by two local news blogs - Brixton Blog running since 2010 which also prints a monthly newspaper, and Brixton Buzz formed in 2011.

=== Radio ===
Choice FM was an independent local radio station broadcasting from studios in Trinity Gardens from 1990 to 2004. It is now replaced by Capital XTRA. Reprezent Radio is a community radio station that broadcasts from Pop Brixton to the local area on 107.3FM. Brixton has always been served by a number of long-running community pirate radio stations including Lightning and Vibes FM.

== Religious sites ==
=== Christian churches ===
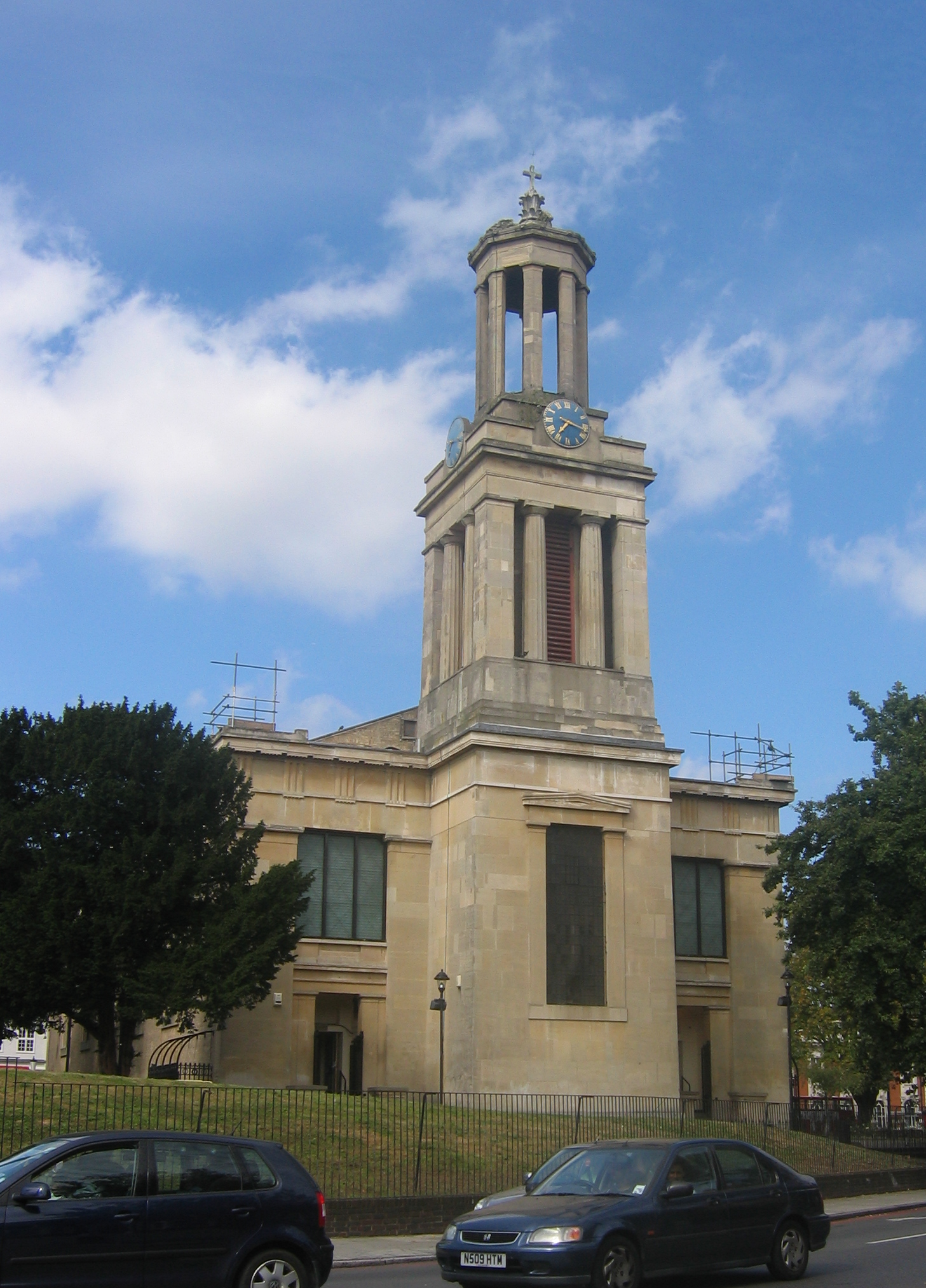
St Matthew's Brixton

Brixton lies within the Anglican Diocese of Southwark. The grade II* listed St Matthew's Church, located on Brixton Green, was built in 1822 by the architect C. F. Porden in the Greek Revival style. It is one of the "Waterloo churches" built to celebrate Britain's victory at the Battle of Waterloo. St. Saviour's Church was a location filming site of Alfred Hitchcock's The Man Who Knew Too Much in 1955, identified in the film as Ambrose Chapel.

The 1868 parish church of St Jude, located on Dulwich Road, was designed by the architect John Kirk of Woolwich. It closed in 1975, and the parish merged with St Matthew's. The church building is today used as business premises by a publishing company.

Christ Church on Brixton Road is an Art Nouveau and Byzantine-style Grade II* listed building built in 1902 by Beresford Pite, and St Paul's church on Ferndale Road was originally built in 1958 as a Seventh-day Adventist church by John Soper.

Corpus Christi Church in Brixton comes under the remit of the Roman Catholic Archdiocese of Southwark.

=== Brixton Mosque ===
The Masjid ibn Taymeeyah, or Brixton Mosque and Islamic Cultural Centre, is located in Gresham Road, close to Brixton Police Station. The mosque has facilities for both men and women and space for 400 worshippers during prayer. Opened in 1990, it is one of the oldest mosques in south London. The mosque provides religious, social and financial support to its members.

The mosque made international headlines when it was reported that Richard Reid, the so-called "shoe bomber", had attended the mosque. Abdul Haqq Baker, chairman of Brixton Mosque, told the BBC that Reid came to the mosque to learn about Islam but soon fell in with what he called "more extreme elements". Zacarias Moussaoui, who was convicted of conspiring to kill citizens of the US as part of 11 September 2001, terrorist attacks, made his initial steps into radical indoctrination in Brixton Mosque, where he met Reid, though he was expelled from the mosque after he turned up wearing combat fatigues and a backpack, and pressured the cleric to give him information on joining the jihad. Abdullah el-Faisal, a radical Muslim cleric who preached in the UK until imprisoned for stirring up hatred and later deported to Jamaica in 2007, was associated with the Brixton Mosque and began preaching to crowds of up to 500 people, but was ousted by its Salafi administration in 1993. Afterward, he gave a lecture he called The Devil's Deception of the Saudi Salafis, scorning the Salafi Muslims (especially the members of the Brixton Mosque), calling them hypocrites and apostates (takfir).

=== Brixton Synagogue ===
Brixton Synagogue at 49 Effra Road opened in 1913 and closed in 1986, with the congregation then amalgamating with the nearby Streatham Synagogue. The front of the building still exists.

== Governance ==
Brixton lies within the parliamentary constituencies of Clapham and Brixton Hill and Dulwich and West Norwood. Since the last boundary changes in 2022, Brixton town centre has been divided between four wards of Lambeth Council.

- Brixton Acre Lane
- Brixton North
- Brixton Rush Common
- Brixton Windrush

The area east and southeast of central Brixton and including Brockwell Park is in the Herne Hill and Loughborough Junction ward.

== Policing, drugs and crime ==
=== Operation Swamp ===
Brixton was the centre of "Operation Swamp 81." Focused on reducing street crime, it made heavy use of the so-called sus law, which allowed police to stop and search individuals on the basis of a "suspicion" of wrongdoing. Plainclothes police officers were dispatched into Brixton, and in five days almost 1,000 people were stopped and searched. The local community was not consulted about the operation and tensions between the black community and the police on the streets of Brixton reached breaking point. Local residents complained that young, inexperienced police officers were provoking confrontation.

=== Gang culture ===
In 2003 The Independent reported that around 200 "hardcore Yardies" were based in Lambeth, some operating as members of "Firehouse Posse" or Brixton's "Kartel Crew". Yardies were historically associated with Jamaican immigrants and had a recognised stronghold in Brixton. Parts of Brixton were referred to as "Little Tivoli" after "Tivoli Gardens", a notorious "garrison community" in Jamaica ruled by gunmen. In 1999 a scandal broke over Metropolitan Police detectives allowing two known Jamaican Yardies to stay in Britain as an intelligence tool. Eaton Green, one of the Yardies, escaped bail in Jamaica in 1991 and settled in Brixton, dealing in crack cocaine. Three months later Green was arrested by a Brixton constable, Steve Barker, and became a paid informer. Green provided intelligence about Yardie activity for two years, continuing the use of firearms and the dealing of crack throughout this time.

Several gangs are headquartered in the Brixton area. The "Murderzone" (MZ) gang, which is involved in illegal drug dealing, hail from the Somerleyton Estate. The "Poverty Driven Children"/"Peel Dem Crew" (PDC) are located in the Angell Town and Loughborough Junction area. "Organised Crime" (OC), a gang linked with various shootings and an ongoing rivalry with the Peckham Boys, are based in the Myatts Field Estate. GAS Gang, which stands for "Guns and Shanks", "Grind and Stack", "Grip and Shoot", or "Gangsters Always Shoot", was located mainly in Angell Town.

In 2011, five of the most prominent members of the GAS Gang—Ricardo Giddings, Helder Demorais, Jamal Moore, Shaquille Haughton and Kyle Kinghorn—were sentenced to a total of 76 years in prison for the murder of rival gang member, fifteen-year-old Zac Olumegbon.

Members of local gangs are mostly in their late teens or early 20s, with gang leaders usually being childhood friends. Brought up in some of London's poorest areas some gang members reportedly move from house to house on an almost nightly basis, making it hard to track them. According to the Metropolitan Police, these youth gangs are far from organised criminal masterminds; however, they continue to evade the police and have been responsible for numerous offences of homicide. Operation Trident officers stated that it is a "struggle" to persuade local people to testify, because of fear of reprisals. Trident officers stated that some gang members were "inept at handling powerful guns", and that gangs have machine guns, in 9 mm. According to the detective many of the deactivated guns are shipped in from the Balkans and then reactivated. Brixton has been noted as one of the most significant origins of UK drill.

=== Drugs ===
Some media commentators persistently call Brixton "the drugs capital of London". Val Shawcross, Labour representative on the London Assembly for Lambeth and Southwark, runs a "Brixton Drug Crime" campaign and she states on her website:

I have been raising the disgraceful state of Brixton and the existence of an open drugs market in the centre – with the Council, Mayor and the Metropolitan police... The police, the Drugs and Firearms Unit and Transport Operational Unit officers have been undertaking long-term surveillance of the area (Brixton Town Centre) culminating in a three-day operation at the end of June to arrest those dealing Class A drugs... The police will be carrying out continuing covert operations in Brixton and patrolling with drug detection dogs. This is a long-term crackdown with the aim on cleaning the dealers out of Brixton.(retrieved July 2008)

For many decades, Brixton has had a reputation for cannabis use and the BBC has quoted a local resident as saying "People have always smoked cannabis in Brixton – everyone knows that, people have walked down the street smoking spliffs for years." This reputation was amplified by the "softly softly" police approach to cannabis that was piloted in Brixton in 2001 to 2005. Concerns were raised about "drug tourism" to the area. The "softly-softly" pilot occurred in the context of a wider debate in Britain about the classification of cannabis. Despite the pilot being stopped and replaced by a "no deal" policy, the Metropolitan Police was in favour of a reclassification of cannabis from class B to class C. Cannabis was officially reclassified in Britain from a class B down to a class C drug in early 2004. In January 2009 the UK government reclassified cannabis back to a class B drug.

=== JayDay Cannabis Festival ===
From 2001 to 2004, Brockwell Park hosted the annual Cannabis Festival, or JayDay, organised by the Cannabis Coalition. The police reportedly maintained a low profile, tolerating the smoking of cannabis. In 2005 the London Borough of Lambeth rejected the application for a further Cannabis Festival on the following grounds:

While Lambeth Council supports freedom of speech and the right to take part in a legitimate campaign, the council cannot condone illegal activities such as cannabis use and drug pushing – both of which have taken place at a previous festival held by the Cannabis Coalition. Indeed, council officers monitoring the event in the past were approached by drug dealers who offered them drugs.

=== Brian Paddick ===
In 2001, Brian Paddick, then Police Commander for the London Borough of Lambeth, became subject of newspaper headlines due to the implementation of a pilot cannabis programme in Brixton, also known as the "softly softly" approach, as well as his posts made on the Brixton-based Urban75 internet forum. Police officers were instructed not to arrest or charge people who were found to be in possession of cannabis. They were instead to issue on-the-spot warnings and confiscate the drugs. Although Paddick is credited with the idea, the pilot programme was sanctioned by the Commissioner of Police of the Metropolis, Sir John Stevens. Paddick asserts that he implemented the policy because he wanted his officers to deal with cannabis quickly and informally so that they could concentrate on heroin and crack cocaine offences, and street robbery and burglary, which were affecting the quality of life in Lambeth to a greater extent. The pilot was ended December 2005 and was replaced by a so-called "no deal" policy on cannabis in Brixton following complaints about increasing numbers of dealers openly selling the drug.

Paddick had been a sergeant on the front line during the 1981 Brixton riot, an experience which shaped his attitudes about confrontational police action and strengthened his belief in community policing. In December 2000 he was appointed Police Commander for Lambeth, where he worked until December 2002, fulfilling his ambition of becoming head of policing in Brixton. Paddick gained much support from the local community for his approach to policing and addressed a rally in his support in March 2002, leading Dominic Casciani from the BBC to comment:

If someone had said just five years ago that black, white, young and old, straight and gay, liberal and anarchist would all be standing together giving a standing ovation to a police commander in Brixton, people might have said they had smoked one spliff too many.

=== Gun crime ===
In June 1998, gun crime in Brixton was reported on widely in connection with the linked murders of Avril Johnson and Michelle Carby, in Brixton and Stratford respectively. Both women were shot in their homes in separate, but connected, attacks; in addition, both victims were shot in the head. In 2008 Tony Thompson, a former Time Out news editor, reported that "Gun crime began to escalate following a series of south London gang executions in the late 1990s." Thompson states that "Previous Met operations were seen as putting down the black community. Trident, from the start, was intelligence-led and had strong links with the black community."

In 2001 the Metropolitan Police raised concerns over rapidly increasing gun crime in London. At the time Lambeth had the highest rate of robberies in London. In July 2001 two armed police officers shot dead black 29-year-old Derek Bennett in Brixton, Angell Town Estate, after Bennett brandished a gun-shaped cigarette lighter. The verdict of the subsequent inquest ruled that Bennett had been "lawfully killed", the verdict was upheld in a subsequent appeal.

In December 2004 Operation Trident officers and armed officers were assisting Lambeth police in a number of stop and search operations targeting "suspected gunmen or vehicles that have been associated with firearms" and called "Operation Trident Swoop" by the police. The Metropolitan Police hoped that "the searches will deter suspects from carrying weapons and prevent shootings taking place, as well as possibly recovering weapons and leading to arrests." Superintendent Jerry Savill, Lambeth Police has responsibility for policing in the Brixton area, stated:

This operation is aimed very specifically at people we have information to suggest may be involved in gun crime or other offences. We want to send out a very clear message to those who carry guns in Lambeth, don't. It is time to stop the vast majority of people in this borough feeling afraid to be on the street and make it the gunmen who are fearful of their community helping the police to arrest them.

In September 2006 Brixton was the scene of a widely reported shooting, involving two boys being shot in the packed McDonald's on Brixton Road/Acre Lane.

In 2007 firearm offences rose by 4 per cent in London, totalling 3,459 "gun-enabled" crimes, including 30 gun murders of which nine victims were aged 18 or under. A series of gun crimes in the Brixton, Clapham and Streatham, including the Murders of three boys in one week, led some media commentators to call the area "gun capital".

== In popular culture ==
=== Music ===
- The 1979 The Clash song The Guns of Brixton, was written and featuring lead vocals by Paul Simonon, who a grew up in Brixton together with fellow The Clash member Mick Jones.

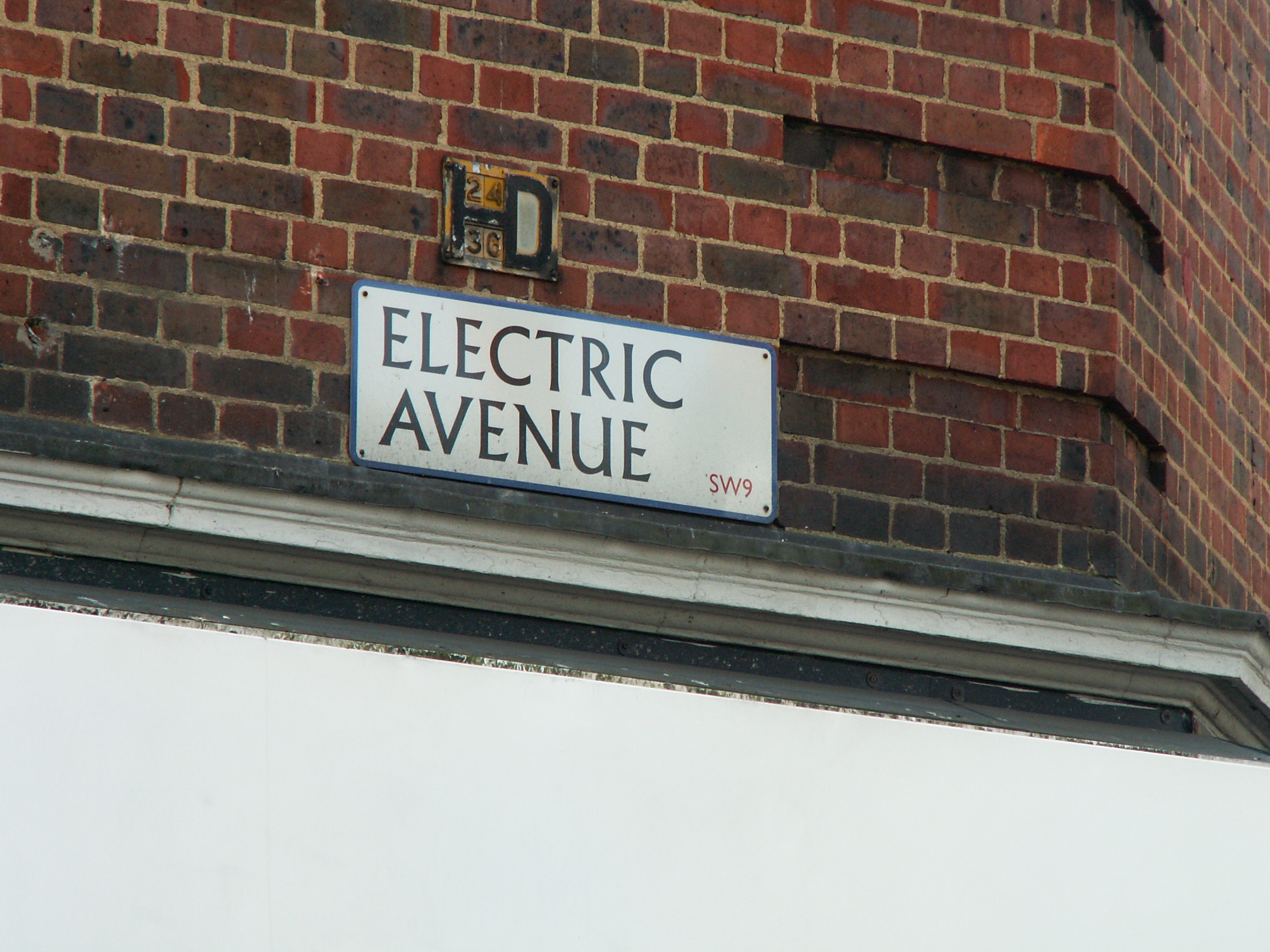
Electric Avenue, the street that gave its name to Eddy Grant's 1982 single

- A 2022 article from Complex named Brixton as the "Mecca of UK drill" due to two original UK drill groups - 150 and 67 - originating in the borough.

=== Film and television ===
- In the 1975 film Monty Python and the Holy Grail, one of the fictional co-directors listed is Reg Llama of Brixton.
- The 1987–1988 sitcom version of The Lenny Henry Show is set in Brixton, with Henry's character Delbert Wilkins playing a DJ on the fictional pirate radio station "Brixton Broadcasting Company, the BBC".
- Sarah Manning, a fictional character from Orphan Black, the 2013-2017 BBC America series, was from Brixton.
- Director Richard Parry's 2001 film South West Nine (SW9), whose name refers to the postcode covering much of central Brixton, was shot here. Confusingly, this postcode is officially that of Stockwell – although the northern part of Brixton falls within the boundary – whereas SW2 (the Brixton Hill sorting office) also covers Tulse Hill A204 road, Streatham Hill and Brixton Hill.
- In the 2023 Disney+ MCU television series Secret Invasion, Brixton is featured by actual location and name, in the second episode, set in 1997, as a secret hideout location/meeting place for Samuel. L. Jackson's character Nick Fury and a refugee alien species called Skrulls.
- The 2023 romantic comedy film Rye Lane contained scenes filmed in the covered market Brixton Village, specifically at the restaurant "Salpike" at which Colin Firth served the main actors.

=== Literature ===
- In John Le Carré's novel Tinker, Tailor, Soldier, Spy, the "scalphunters" of Britain's MI6 are based in Brixton, in "a grim flint schoolhouse... behind a flint wall with glass and barbed wire on the top." They are the section of MI6 specializing in "hit-and-run jobs... too dirty or too risky for the residents abroad" such as "murder, kidnapping, or crash blackmail."

=== Internet ===
- Urban75 is a long-running internet forum based in Brixton.

== Transport ==
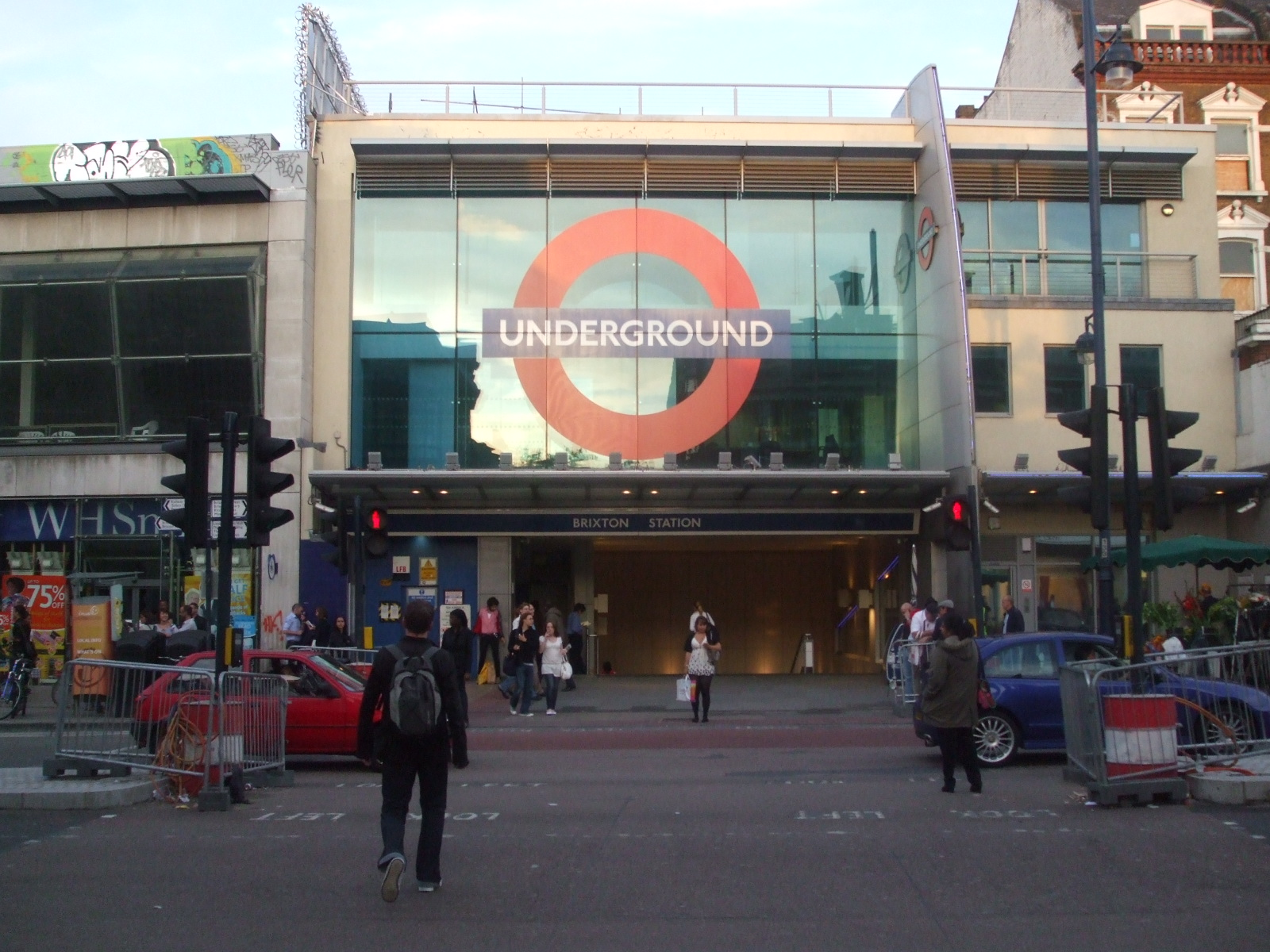
Brixton tube station entrance

=== Buses ===
Brixton is served by London Buses routes 2, 3, 35, 37, 45, 59, 109, 133, 159, 196, 250, 322, 333, 345, 355, 415, 432, P4, P5, N2, N3, N35, N109, and N133.

=== London Underground ===
The nearest station is Brixton on the Victoria line. Around the corner from it is the National Rail station.

=== National Rail ===
The nearest station is Brixton for Southeastern services towards London Victoria and Orpington. It is located around just around the corner from the Underground station.

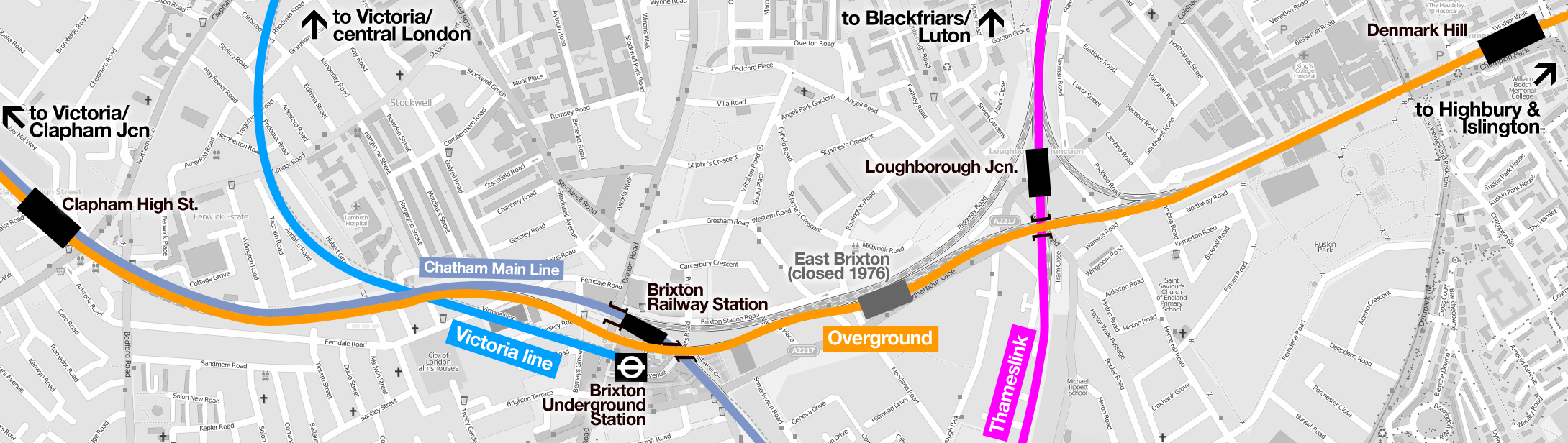
Map of rail & tube lines passing through Brixton

=== Road network ===
Brixton is located on several main roads. The A203, A204 and A2217 links the area to Vauxhall Bridge and the A23 London to Brighton road runs through the area from the north to the south. Brixton was due to be a major interchange of the South Cross Route, part of the London Ringways plan, which was cancelled in the 1970s.

== Notable people ==
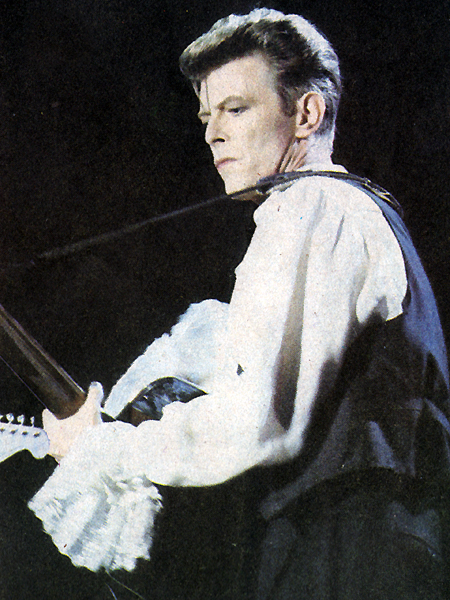
Musician David Bowie

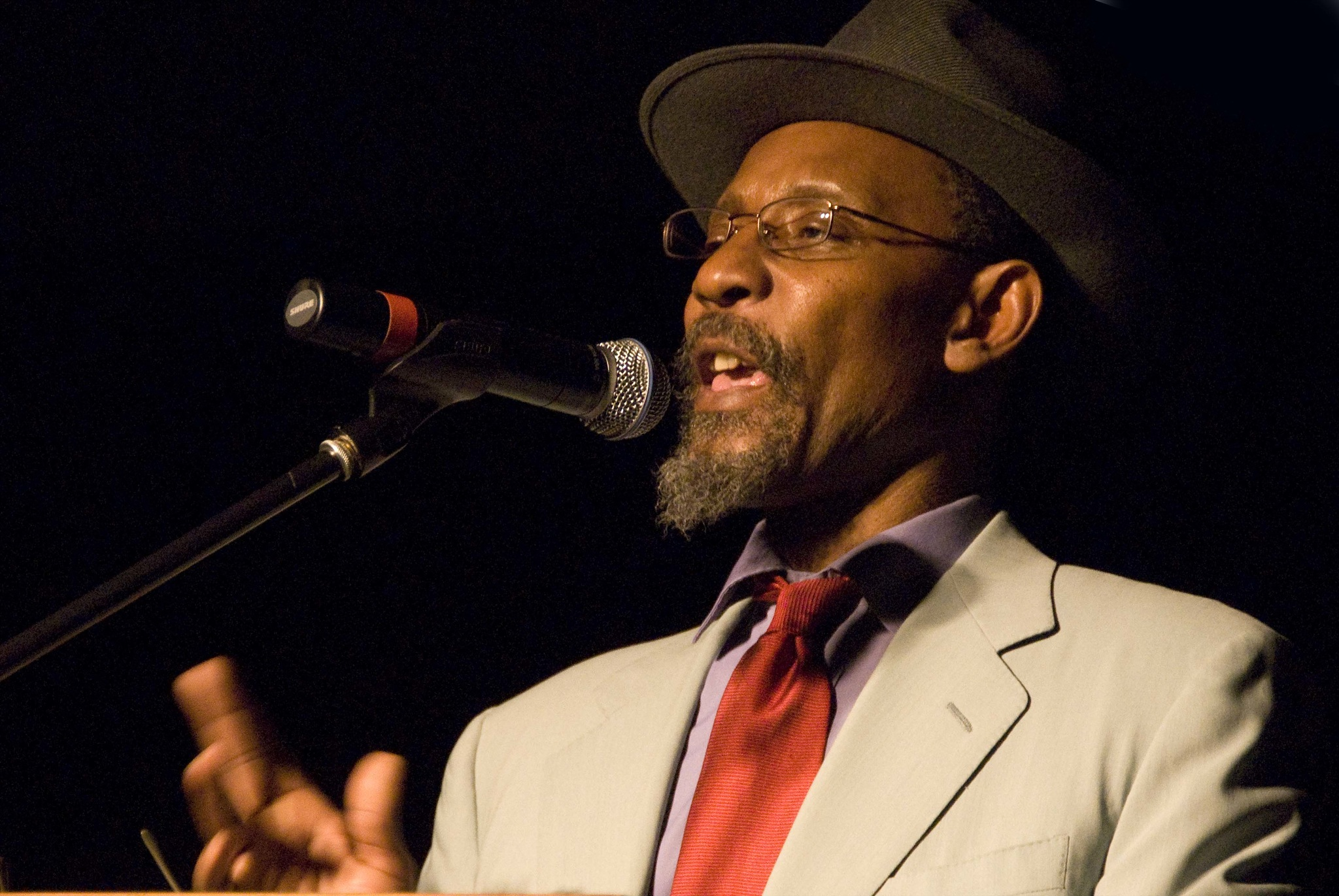
Poet Linton Kwesi Johnson

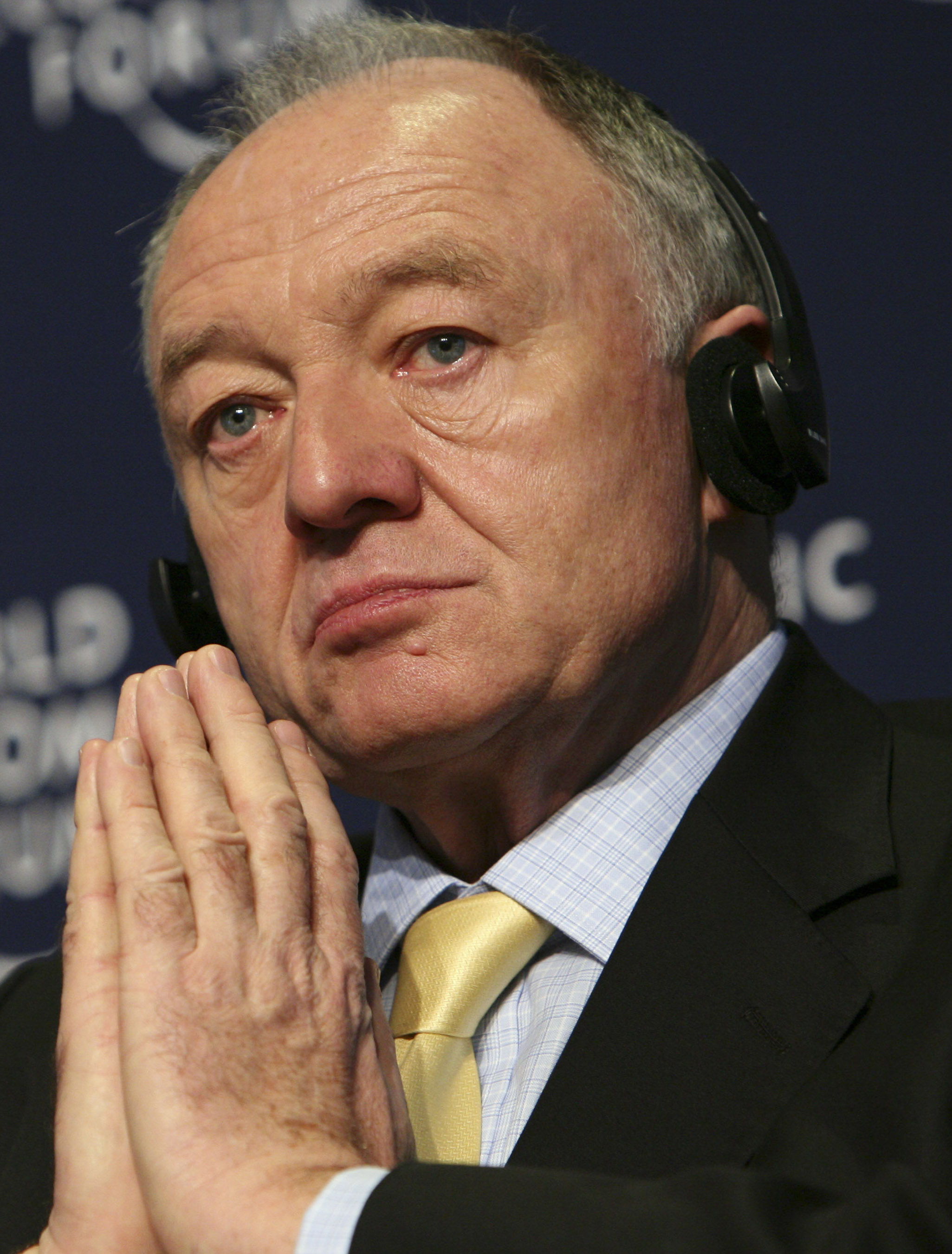
Former Mayor Ken Livingstone

Three people who have lived in Brixton have blue plaques marking their former homes:

- Havelock Ellis, pioneer sexologist lived at Dover Mansions on Canterbury Crescent
- C. L. R. James, the writer and black political activist, lived in Railton Road, above the offices of Race Today
- Dan Leno (1860–1904), an English music hall comedian famous for his drag acts (56 Akerman Road)

Other notable people with Brixton connections include:

- David Bowie, singer, songwriter and actor
- Peter Hawkins, voice artist, actor
- Ken Livingstone, former Mayor of London
- Linton Kwesi Johnson, poet
- John Major, former British Prime Minister, began his political career as a local Lambeth councillor
- Max Wall, comedian and music hall performer
- Freddie Davies, comedian and actor
- Poly Styrene, singer of the band X-Ray Spex
- Jumpin Jack Frost, drum and bass producer and DJ
- Danny Williams, heavyweight boxer
- Frank Dillane, film actor
- Paul Simonon and Mick Jones of The Clash
- Dillinja, drum and bass producer
- Daniel Mulloy, screenwriter, director
- Alabama 3, musical group, formed in Brixton
- Basement Jaxx, house music duo, formed in Brixton
- EBK, musician
- Fruitbat, musician, Carter the Unstoppable Sex Machine
- Jan Chappell, actress, best known as Cally in Blake's 7
- Joe Cornish, BBC presenter, producer
- Bradley McIntosh, musician, S Club 7
- Sharon Osbourne, television personality, music manager, wife of Ozzy Osbourne
- Skin, singer, Skunk Anansie
- Stereo MC's, acid jazz/club group, formed and based in Brixton
- Martin Millar, novelist
- Rudy Narayan, barrister and civil rights activist
- James Lovelock, environmentalist, famous for proposing the Gaia hypothesis
- Frank Reginald Carey, Second World War fighter ace
- Jo Self, artist
- Iwan Thomas, Olympic athlete
- Nyron Nosworthy, professional footballer
- Shivani Kapoor, Indian model
- Ty, rapper
- Sneakbo, rapper
- Big Narstie, rapper
- Luol Deng, NBA player, Chicago Bulls and Miami Heat
- Alex Wheatle, novelist
- Lisa Maffia, singer and TV personality
- Bunmi Mojekwu, actress
- James Dagwell, journalist and former BBC News presenter
- La Roux (Elly Jackson), musician
- Hew Locke, contemporary artist
- Nikki Sudden, musician, the Jacobites
- Danny Kirwan, musician, Fleetwood Mac
- Clive Dunn (1920–2012), actor, Dad's Army
- Jean Kent (1921–2013), actress
- Philip Lindsey Clark, sculptor
- AJ Tracey, rapper
- Dillian Whyte, Jamaican-born boxer
- Dave, rapper
- Bob and Alf Pearson, British musical double act
- Deno, rapper
- Pearl Mackie, actress
- Pat Marsh, secretary of the British Ice Hockey Association
- Herbert Morrison, Labour politician
