= Born Romantic =

2000 film by David Kane

- Directed by: David Kane
- Written by: David Kane
- Produced by: Michele Camarda
- Starring: Craig Ferguson; Jane Horrocks; Catherine McCormack; David Morrissey; Olivia Williams
- Cinematography: Robert Alazraki
- Edited by: Michael Parker
- Production companies: United Artists; BBC Films; Harvest Pictures
- Distributed by: Optimum Releasing
- Release date: 9 March 2001 (UK)
- Running time: 96 min
- Country: United Kingdom
- Language: English
- Box office: £255,000

Born Romantic is a 2000 British film directed by David Kane. The film is centered on a salsa club and depicts four love stories. Fergus is trying to find the one he left behind on the eve of their wedding, charmer and Rat Pack fanatic Frankie woos the beautiful Eleanor and the robber Eddie falls hopelessly in love with dowdy cemetery worker Jocelyn. Meanwhile, taxi driver Jimmy is transporting all of them and dealing with a love story of his own.

== Plot ==
Salsa dancing and 'El Corazon', a London Salsa Club provide the backdrop for the love-inspired efforts of three unlikely romantics:

Fergus (David Morrissey), who arrives in London from his native Liverpool, on a search for Maureen ('Mo') Docherty (Jane Horrocks), the high-school sweetheart he jilted years ago.

Eddie (Jimi Mistry), the incompetent mugger who falls for Jocelyn (Catherine McCormack), the neurotic "absentee grave tender" (she tends the graves of loved ones for people who cannot).

Frankie (Craig Ferguson), a hopeless romantic trapped in the fifties and still sharing a house with his ex. He pursues the elegant and snobbish Eleanor (Olivia Williams), art restorer by day and Salsa dancer by night.

All are connected by Jimmy (Adrian Lester), a cab driver, and a place, 'El Corazon'.

== Cast ==
- Craig Ferguson as Frankie
- Jane Horrocks as Maureen "Mo" Docherty
- Adrian Lester as Jimmy
- Catherine McCormack as Jocelyn
- Jimi Mistry as Eddie
- David Morrissey as Fergus
- Olivia Williams as Eleanor
- Kenneth Cranham as Barney
- John Thomson as First Cab Driver
- Ian Hart as Second Cab Driver
- Paddy Considine as Ray
- Hermione Norris as Carolanne
- Sally Phillips as Suzy
- Jessica Hynes as Libby
- Ashley Walters as Lee

== Production notes ==
The film features various London locations, including the interior of the British Museum.

The interior scenes of the Salsa club 'El Corazon' were filmed in a real Salsa club called the Loughborough Hotel in Loughborough Road, Brixton, South London, now a converted block of flats.

Also all the Salsa dancers were club members who participated in the film as extras.

The soundtrack includes a number of Latin dance hits:

- "Píntame", performed by Elvis Crespo
- "Acuyuye", performed by DLG
- "Ella Fue" performed by Fania All-Stars
- "Yo No Como Camaron" performed by Saoco
- "Oye Como Va" performed by Cheo Feliciano
- "Bururu Barara" performed by Fruko y sus Tesos
- "Ran Kan Kan" performed by Tito Puente
- "Ojalá" performed by Kassav
- "La Engandora" performed by Ruben Gonzalez
- "Yamulemau" performed by Joe Arroyo
- "Como Ves" performed by Ozomatli
- "La Bomba" performed by Ricky Martin
- "Indestructible" performed by Robby Salinas
- "L.O.V.E." performed by Craig Ferguson
- "Sway" performed by Dean Martin
- "Baby Won't You Please Come Home" performed by Jane Horrocks and Dean Martin
- "Fear & Love" performed by Morcheeba
- "Doin Jobz 4 Tha Mob" performed by Pigforce
- "Yes Sir I Can Boogie" performed by Nina Miranda
- "My Own High" performed by Shiver

== Reception ==
The film grossed £198,000 ($291,255) in its opening weekend in the United Kingdom. It grossed £255,000 ($376,090) worldwide.
