= Brixton Windmill =

Brixton Windmill may refer to:

- Ashby's Mill, a windmill in Brixton, South London
- The Windmill, Brixton, a pub and live music venue adjacent to and named after Ashby's Mill
