= JD Twitch =

Scottish DJ and producer (1968–2025)

- Born: Keith McIvor; 2 March 1968; Balerno, Scotland
- Died: 19 September 2025 (aged 57)
- Occupations: Record producer; DJ

Keith McIvor (2 March 1968 – 19 September 2025), better known as JD Twitch, was a Scottish DJ, record producer and label founder, best known as one half of the duo Optimo with Jonnie Wilkes. Active in club culture from the late 1980s, he was a central figure in Glasgow's dance scene and became internationally recognised for his eclectic, genre-crossing approach to DJing.

== Early life ==
McIvor was born in 1968 in the village of Balerno on the outskirts of Edinburgh, where he was also raised. He moved to Glasgow in 1986 to attend university. He became involved in club culture across both cities, initially DJing electro and EBM in Edinburgh before embracing house and techno during the acid house era.

== Career ==
In the early 1990s, McIvor co-founded the club night Pure, which became a key event in Scotland's early house and techno movement.

=== Optimo ===
In 1997, McIvor and Wilkes launched Optimo (Espacio), a Sunday night event at Glasgow's Sub Club named after the Liquid Liquid track "Optimo". Described as "one of Glasgow's most beloved club nights", it ran until 2010 and became renowned for its adventurous programming and hosting artists including LCD Soundsystem, TV on the Radio, Grace Jones, and Lee "Scratch" Perry. According to DJ Mag, "the party set a new standard for clubbing with its fearless programming and inclusive policies, pushing everything from techno, electro, and post-punk to disco, funk and even pop classics with a chaotic and experimental spirit."

Over the next 15 years, they toured internationally, performing at numerous clubs and festivals while holding residencies at venues such as The Berkeley Suite in Glasgow and Phonox in London. McIvor also organized events in Glasgow such as Bucky Skank, focused on Jamaican sound system culture (with Wilkes), and So Low, centered on industrial, cold wave, minimal synth and related genres. Several of these events also supported local food banks.

In 2024, the duo marked the 25th anniversary of their club night with a two-part double-vinyl compilation. Reviewing the release for DJ Mag, Kristan J. Caryl called Optimo 25 "the sound of history" that distilled the energy of more than 500 events into a "snapshot of the music they believed in then and stand by now."

=== Production and label work ===
McIvor also gained recognition as a solo artist, with releases on labels including Let's Get Lost, Juno Records, and Heavenly Recordings. He spent a short period signed to Matador Records in the early 2000s. He was an active producer and remixer, credited with over 100 remixes for artists such as Franz Ferdinand, Róisín Murphy, Manic Street Preachers, and Florence + the Machine. He often worked under temporary aliases including Tomorrow the Rain Will Fall Upwards, This Is Belgium, and Betty Botox.

McIvor founded the label Optimo Music and its sub-imprints (Optimo Music Digital Danceforce, Optimo Trax, So Low, and Against Fascism Trax), releasing a wide range of material including the Brazil-focused Selva Discos. The label was known for its diverse and experimental catalogue that included releases by Factory Floor, Chris Carter, and Saint Sappho. Optimo also curated notable compilations such as How to Kill the DJ (Part Two).

In 2019, McIvor curated the soundtrack to Beats (2019), a film set in Scotland's 1990s rave scene.

== Illness and death ==
In July 2025, McIvor announced that he had been diagnosed with an untreatable brain tumour. He died at the Prince and Princess of Wales Hospice in Glasgow, on 19 September 2025, aged 57.

== Selected discography ==
- May Day (EP, Optimo Music)
- Sketches for Winter (mixtape, Optimo Music)
