= EBK =

EBK may refer to

- DJ EBK (born 1978), British musician
- Eastbrook railway station, in Wales
- Eastern Bontoc language
- Ecobank Kenya
- École Belge de Kigali, a Belgian school in Rwanda
- Einstein–Brillouin–Keller method
- Ertebølle culture, a Mesolithic culture of Europe
- Esbo Bollklubb, a Finnish football club
- Swiss Federal Banking Commission
- EBK Jaaybo, American rapper
- Elite ball knowledge, a 2020s slang term
