= Phonox =

Nightclub in London

- Interactive map of Phonox
- Location: 418 Brixton Road, London
- Coordinates: 51°27′52″N 0°6′52.2″W
- Owner: The Columbo Group
- Type: Nightclub
- Capacity: 450

Construction
- Opened: 2015

Website
- Official website

Phonox is a nightclub in Brixton, London, specialising in electronic music. It occupies the building that was previously used by the club Plan B. The club opened in September 2015 with a residency by the DJ Jasper James.

In 2019, DJ Magazine listed it as one of its top 100 DJ nightclubs. Both Time Out and Cosmopolitan list it as one of London's best nightclubs.
