= St Matthew's Church, Brixton =

Church in Brixton, London

Coordinates: 51°27′35″N 0°6′58″W

St Matthew’s Church, Brixton
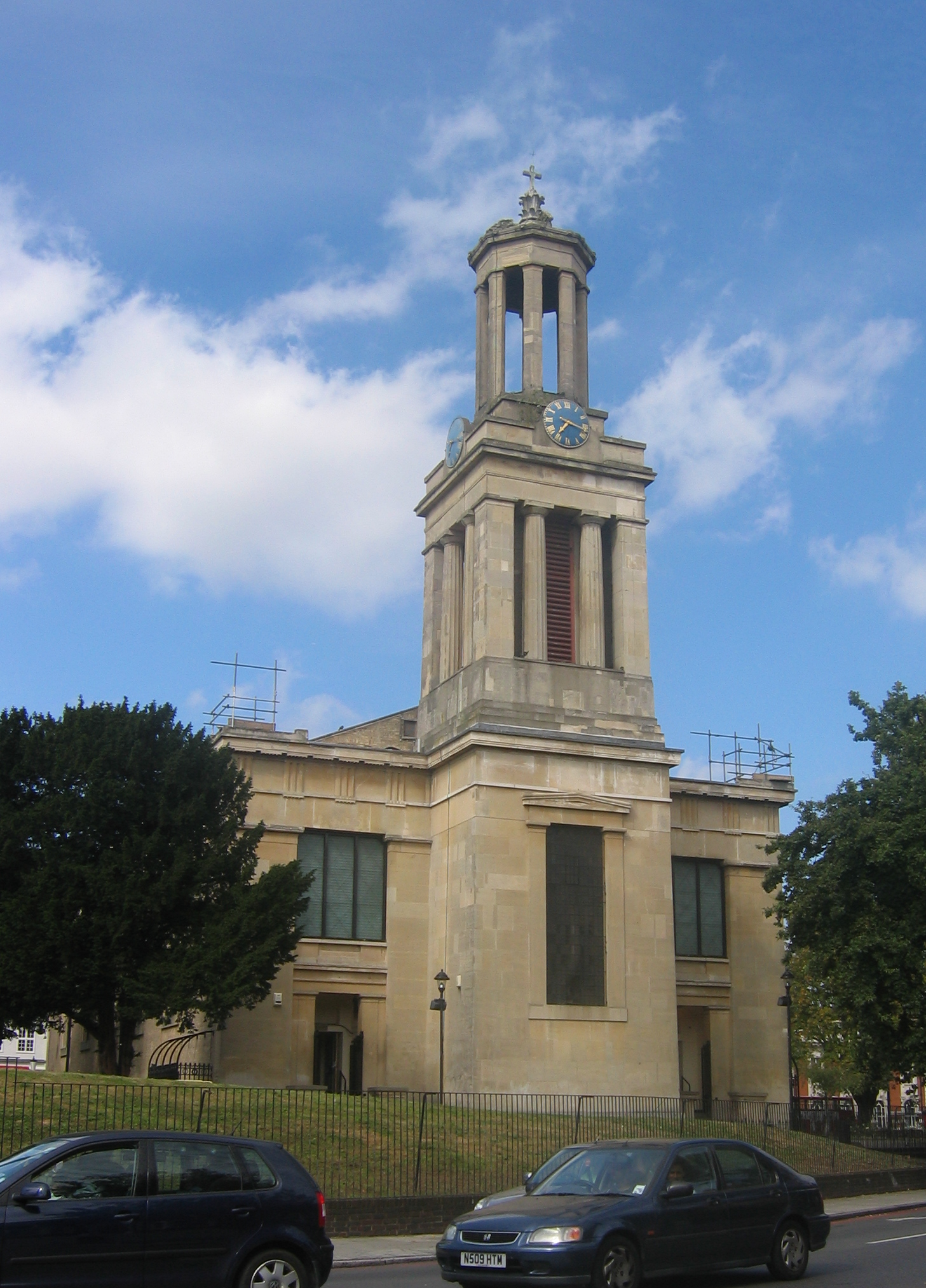
- St Matthew’s Church, Brixton
- Denomination: Church of England
- Website: http://www.stmatthewsbrixton.org/

History
- Dedication: St Matthew

Architecture
- Architect: Charles Ferdinand Porden
- Groundbreaking: 1 July 1822
- Completed: 21 June 1824

Administration
- Province: Canterbury
- Diocese: Southwark
- Archdeaconry: Lambeth
- Deanery: Lambeth North
- Parish: Brixton St Matthew with St Jude

Clergy
- Vicar: Rev Stephen Sichel

St Matthew's Church is a Church of England church in the London Borough of Lambeth. It is a Grade II* listed building which occupies a prominent position at the junction of Brixton Road, Brixton Hill and Effra Road. The church was constructed following the Church Building Act 1818 and was consecrated in 1824.

== Parish ==
Until 1824, Brixton was part of the large ancient parish of Lambeth, whose church stood about 3 miles (4.8 km) away, next to Lambeth Palace. These arrangements were inconvenient for those living in the new housing that was already starting to appear along the main roads passing through Brixton, a situation that was addressed by the construction of four new churches named after the four Evangelists at Waterloo, Kennington, Norwood and St Matthew's at Brixton. The St Matthew's parish created in 1824 included Brixton, Brixton Hill, Herne Hill, Tulse Hill and (in modern terms) the Loughborough Junction and western Camberwell area.

In 1886 the population of the parish amounted to 13,924 and was served by three clergy. The total proportion attending (morning and evening services) was 12.4%.

In 1901 the population of the parish was 12,029. In the following year, there were two clergymen and the total proportion attending was 11.2%. The Church was able to support large scale musical events through its own amateur orchestra and oratorio choir: in 1902 there were five concerts and in 1903 seven, conducted by the organist Douglas Redman, including ambitious works such as Gade's cantata Zion and Tchaikovsky's Pathetique symphony.

In 2002 St Matthew's parish was united with that of St Jude's in East Brixton, whose church building had been sold in 1980 and which had no incumbent since 1991. St Jude's was built in 1867–68.

Based on statistics from the UK census, the Diocese of Southwark estimates the population of the parish was 12,100 in 2001 and 15,500 in 2011. It is not clear whether the figure for 2001 includes people who were then living in the former parish of St Jude's.

== Building ==
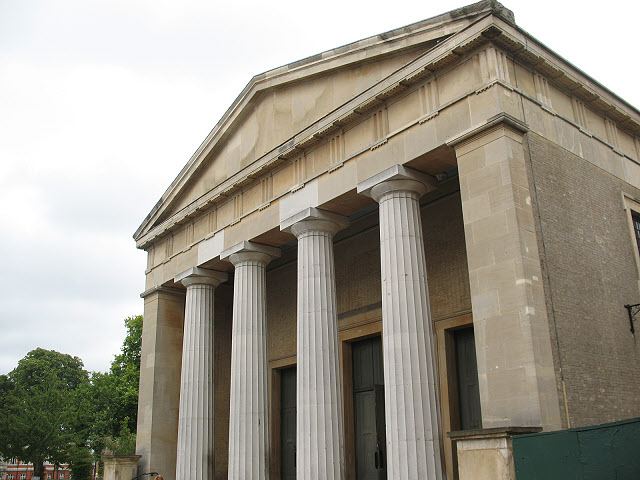
Portico of St Matthew's Church

The church was constructed following the Church Building Act 1818, which allowed for new churches in overpopulated parishes. Land was taken from Rush Common for the church. Initial works began late in 1821 and the foundation stone was laid by Charles Manners-Sutton, Archbishop of Canterbury on 1 July 1822. The church was consecrated in 1824.

Since 19 October 1951 St Matthew's church has been designated a Grade II* listed building. It was designed by Charles Ferdinand Porden (1790-1863) with the foundation stone laid in 1822 and the church consecrated two years later. The building is a rectangle, with a massive Greek Doric entrance portico at the west end, fronting onto Brixton Hill. A tower stands at the east end of the building.

During the 1970s and subsequently, major internal alterations have been carried out to provide accommodation for a variety of activities, including continued use of a part by the Anglican congregation.

The building and its churchyard occupies a highly visible triangular site at the junction of major roads, but pedestrian access is somewhat restricted because of the width of these roads and the density of the traffic.

== Architecture ==
Constructed on a stone plinth, the church is built of yellow brick, enhanced with dressings in stone and Roman cement. The west portico is tetrastyle in antis with Doric columns. Entry is through a set of three large doors, which have original cast iron boot scrapers. The sides of the church have five bays with pilasters, and entry to the crypt is made down flights of stairs through doors protected by wrought iron gates. The tower has a square bell stage with Doric screens, below an octagonal "Tower of the Winds" topped by a crown and cross and with a clock at its base.

== Notable people ==
Former British Prime Minister John Major married Norma Major in the church in 1970.
