= Loughborough Road =

Road in Brixton, South London

Coordinates: 51.469°N 0.105°W

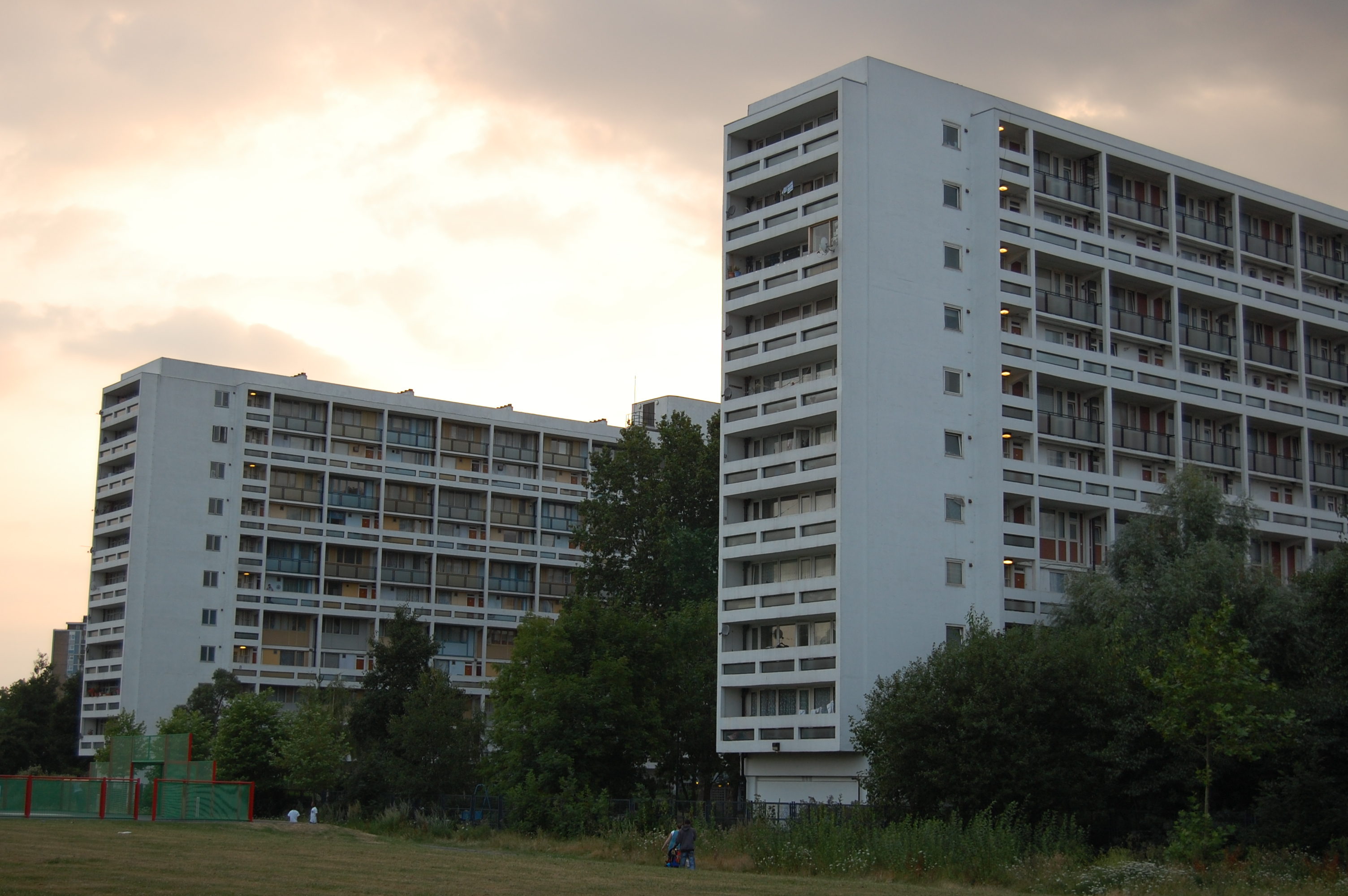
Two blocks in the Loughborough Estate

Loughborough Road is in Brixton, in the south London Borough of Lambeth. Running between Brixton Road and Loughborough Junction, it has always been mainly residential, but in the past two centuries has included many shops and taverns.

== History ==
Loughborough Road was named after the seventeenth century manor house owner, Henry Hastings, first Baron Loughborough. It is a street of two halves. The north end between Brixton Road and Akerman Road, remains largely as it was built in the 1850–60s. However, from Akerman Road down to Coldharbour Lane, little remains of the original Victorian housing, which was demolished to make way for the Loughborough Road Estate.

== Loughborough Road Estate ==
Loughborough Road was not as badly affected as some streets in the area from German bombing during World War II. However, many of the older houses towards the Coldharbour Lane end of the street were demolished for projects to meet the huge post-war demand for housing. One project, Iveagh House, was described at its opening in 1952 as the first block of “semi-luxury” flats for single women to be built in South London by the Guinness Trust housing society since the war. The Loughborough Road Estate, meanwhile, which was built by the London County Council between 1953 and 1957, was a mixed-density development that included nine blocks, each of eleven storeys.

== Pubs ==
In the nineteenth and twentieth centuries the street had four pubs: the Angell Arms, the Loughborough Hotel, the Hero of Switzerland, and the White Hart. The Hero of Switzerland, the last surviving pub, rebuilt in the 1960s, closed in 2020. For well over a quarter of a century from the mid-1870s, members of the Brixton Bowling Club used the well-tended green attached to the Hero of Switzerland to hold its championships, and to play against other clubs. It was so closely associated with the site, it renamed itself the Hero of Switzerland Bowling Club. In the early 1880s, the Hero of Switzerland was also the headquarters of the Brixton Ramblers Cycling Club. The Loughborough Hotel, a destination for ‘disco’ and clubbing, closed in the early 2000s. It remains almost legendary in south London for the Mambo Inn, a club with DJs playing a mix of Afro, Latin and Reggae music to packed crowds.

== Notable residents ==
Many residents of Loughborough Road have been associated with the area's vibrant music hall and entertainment industry. They included the trick cyclist Jack Lotto (1856-1944), who would become one of the co-founders of the entertainment industry charitable organisation, the Grand Order of Water Rats; Augusta Carolina Rosaline Wingfield, who in the late 1800s performed as “Alphonsine, Queen of the Spiral”; the funambulist, Ella Zuila (1854-1926) and her acrobat husband George Loyal (1848-1920); and Irish-born “blackface” comedian George Le Clerq and his actor wife, Georgina White.

Other residents included the Percy family whose business operations ranged from feather dressing to taxidermy, and Nelly Roberts (1872-1959), an orchid artist who documented early species brought to Britain from around the world by wealthy collectors.
