= Ashby's Mill =

Brixton Windmill

Brixton Windmill
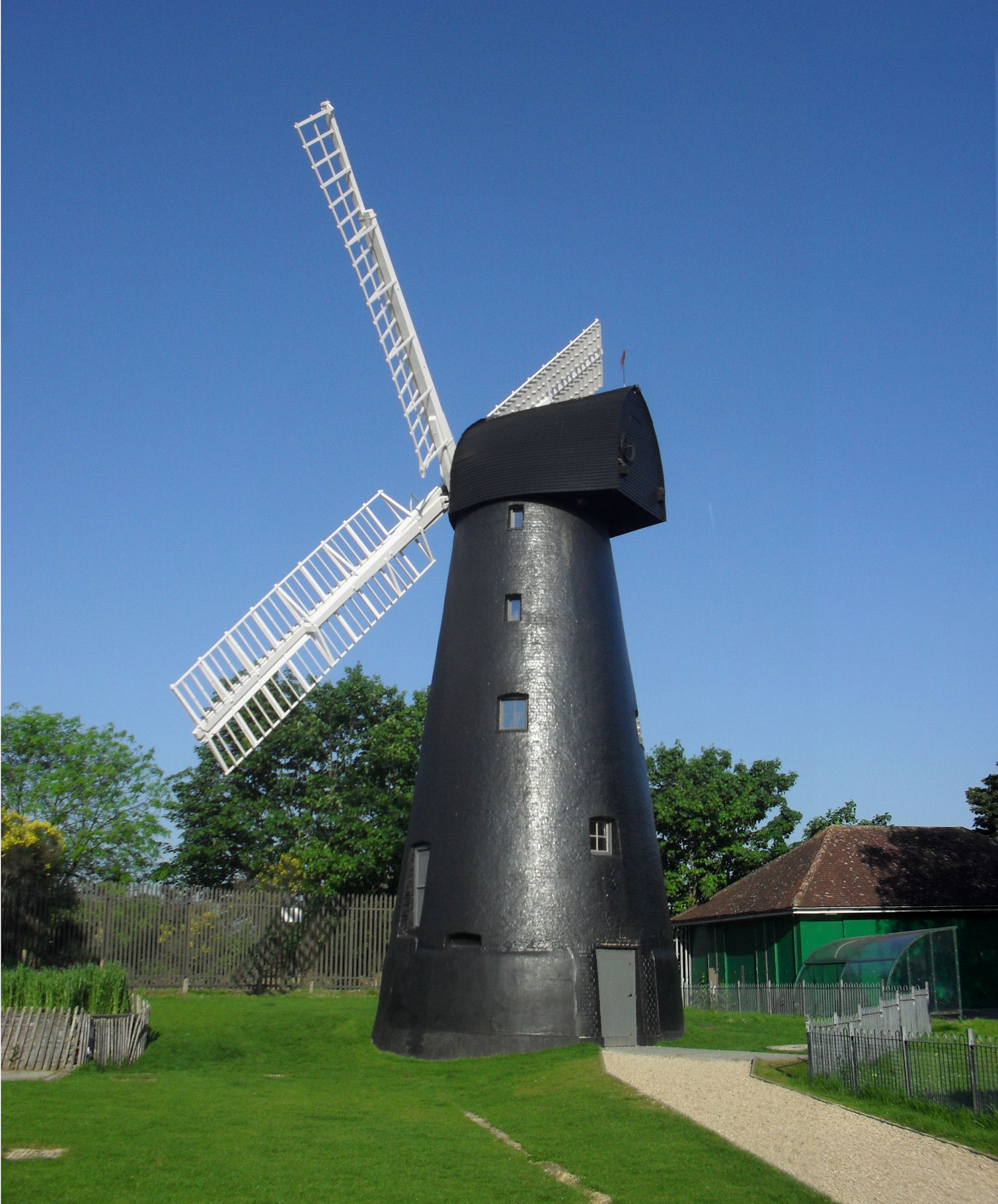
- The mill in 2012

Origin
- Mill name: Ashby's Mill
- Grid reference: TQ 303 737
- Coordinates: 51.453219°N 0.123849°W
- Operator: London Borough of Lambeth
- Year built: 1816

Information
- Purpose: Corn mill
- Type: Tower mill
- Storeys: Four storeys
- No. of sails: Four sails
- Type of sails: Two Common sails and two Patent sails
- Windshaft: Cast iron
- Winding: Hand winded by wheel and rope
- Auxiliary power: Steam engine, later replaced by a gas engine

Ashby's Mill, often referred to as Brixton Windmill, is a restored grade II* listed tower mill at Brixton in the London Borough of Lambeth. The mill was in Surrey when built and has been preserved.

== History ==
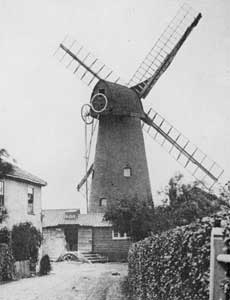
The mill in working order, 1864

Ashby's Mill was built in 1816 and worked by wind until 1862, when the business was transferred to a watermill at Mitcham on the River Wandle. The sails were removed in 1862 and two years later the windmill was relegated to use as a store. In 1902, the lease on the watermill expired and a steam engine was installed in the windmill. This was later replaced by a gas engine. The windmill was worked by engine until 1934, and supplied wholemeal flour to West End hotels and restaurants.

After the war, there were proposals to demolish the mill and build a block of flats. The proposal was rejected and it was decided to conserve the mill, which was restored in 1964 by London County Council. New sails were fitted, and machinery from a derelict windmill at Burgh le Marsh, Lincolnshire installed to replace that which had been removed. The work was done by Thompson's, the Alford millwrights. Following restoration, the mill was opened to the public at Easter 1968. The mill passed to Lambeth Council in 1971 and remains in their ownership. Further restoration was carried out in 1978 and 1983, but the windmill had been placed on the Buildings at Risk Register in 1995.

The Friends of Windmill Gardens had been formed in April 2003 with the aim of restoring the windmill and surrounding area as a public amenity. In September 2004, an archaeological dig was organised, with assistance from the Museum of London Archaeology Service. A £25,000 grant was given by Lambeth Borough Council towards repairs to the mill and gardens. A £2,000,000 restoration plan has been put together with assistance from the Horniman Museum and the Society for the Protection of Ancient Buildings. An application for a grant from the Heritage Lottery Fund was submitted. The Heritage Lottery Fund granted £397,700 towards the restoration. Lambeth Council and the Friends of Windmill Gardens also contributed towards the restoration of the mill, which cost £581,000. The restored mill was officially opened to the public on 2 May 2011 by Chuka Umunna, MP for Streatham.

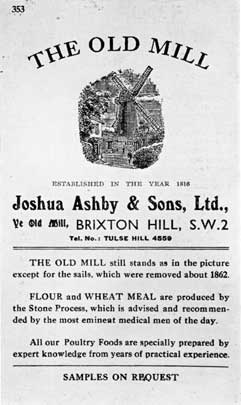
Leaflet from Ashby's mill, Brixton, 1914

== Description ==
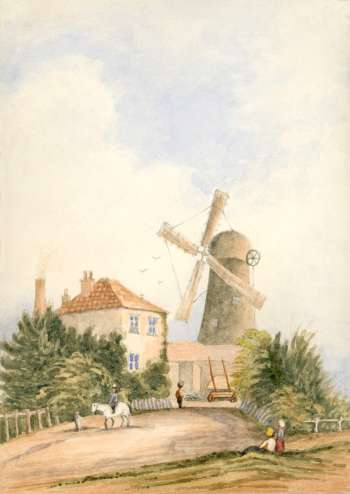
Painting of mill, c.1820

Ashby's Mill is a four-storey brick tower mill with a boat shaped cap. It had two Patent sails and two Common sails. The cap was winded by a hand wheel, no fantail being fitted. The cast iron windshaft is the only remaining original piece of machinery. The mill is 22 feet (6.71 m) diameter at the base and 39 feet 6 inches (12.04 m) to the curb, and 49 feet (14.94 m) high overall.

== Millers ==
- John Ashby 1816 - 1845
- Joshua Ashby 1860s - 1934
