= Dreph =

English graffiti artist

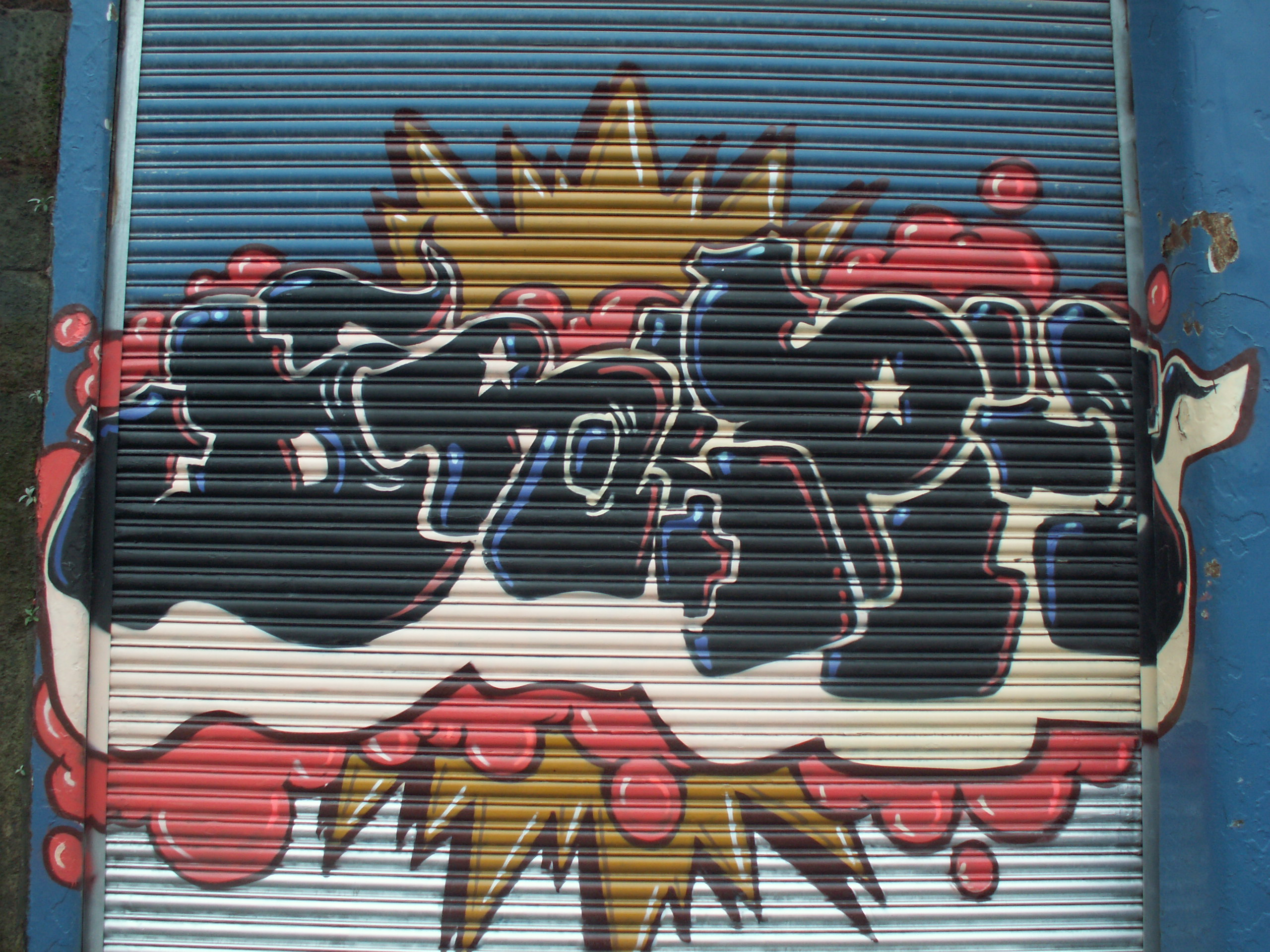
- A piece by Dreph on a roller shutter, 2005
- Born: Neequaye Dsane; 1973 (age 51–52); Nottingham, Nottinghamshire, England
- Style: Muralism
- Movement: Graffiti
- Website: dreph.co.uk

Tag

Neequaye Dreph Dsane (born 1973), also known as Dreph, is a London-based visual artist known for large-scale portraits in the public realm.

== Biography ==
He was born in Nottingham to Ghanaian parents, grew up in Windsor, and now lives in east London.

In 2017, in a series of 10 murals across London entitled You Are Enough, depicting women of African and Caribbean descent, he paid "tribute to ordinary women who do extraordinary work for the betterment of their communities and society".
