= Street crime =

Criminal offense in a public place

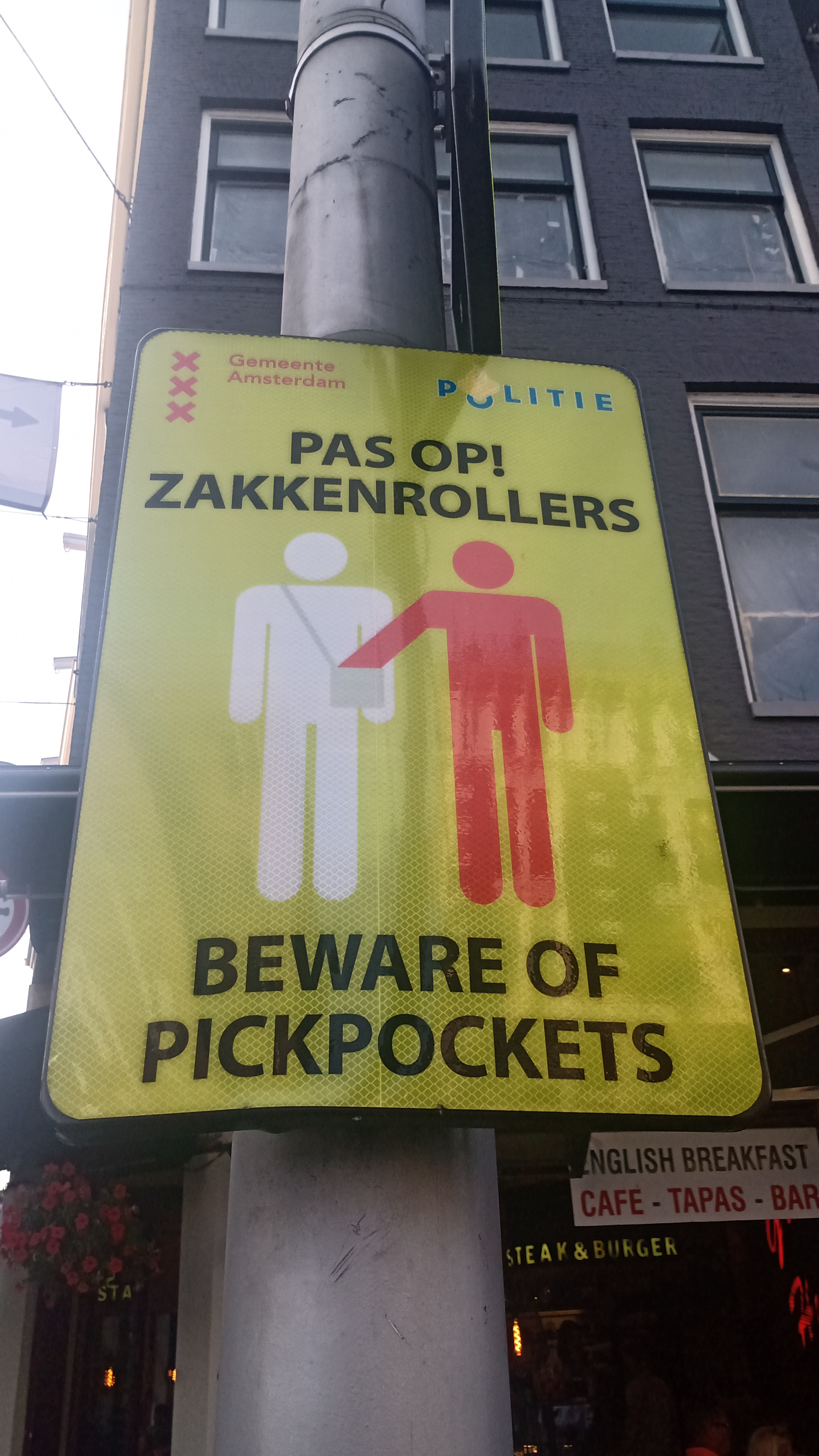
Sign on an Amsterdam street warning of pickpockets

Street crime is a loose term for any criminal offense in a public place. According to London's Metropolitan Police Force, "Robbery, often called 'mugging', and thefts from victims in the street where their property is snatched and the victim is not assaulted are also considered 'street crime'." Examples of street crime include pickpocketing, the open illegal drugs trade, prostitution in the form of soliciting outside the law, the creation of graffiti and vandalism of public property, and assaults. As a generic term, street crime may include all of these, as well as offenses against private properties such as the stealing of hub caps.

The majority of street crimes, as portrayed by various news media, are initiated by criminals seeking quick financial gains. However, they can also be carried out by organized individuals with the common goal of profiteering. On the other hand, not all of these instances are considered by the FBI to be "organized crimes" due to the random nature of the crimes themselves. The term "organized crime" does not often include organized street crimes. Organized crime is often a major business, consisting of many individuals associated with the common goal of criminal profiteering. In contrast, street crimes are normally conducted by hastily and loosely formed groups of individuals with the common goal of gaining illicit money through immediate criminal acts.

== Economic and social impact ==
In 2016, the government allocated $31.8 billion to the Justice Department, where that money was utilized to incarcerate criminals, police them, enforce the law, and defend the interests of the United States. This not only takes a toll on the government's budget but also on taxpayers and multiple other organizations where money is being deducted in order to imprison criminals. In order to compensate for the increased budget for the Department of Justice, often taxes are increased, and oftentimes individuals spend money to prevent encountering crime. Other factors impact those who are victims of these crimes, where they are spending money on medical care, property damages, and oftentimes the loss of a steady income for their families. Areas of urban decay, characterized by abandoned buildings and cars, unkempt vacant lots, and broken windows, tend to attract the homeless and increase criminal activity. Instead of helping to improve these areas, which can be done by communities, the areas often start out with minor offenses but often become major events.

"A second factor is that increasing public concern about the safety of the streets has generated vigorous demands for more police protection and a growing public recognition of the limited capacity of many police agencies to mount an effective program of crime control and prevention. Crime seems to be getting out of hand, engulfing new neighborhoods and erupting in riotous assault, looting, and arson in the central slum areas of the big cities. A statistical report that did not show more crime under such conditions would seem puzzling indeed to the ordinary citizen. A cyclical pattern has been set in motion where the increasing public readiness to accept an accurate portrayal of the full dimensions of the crime problem meets an increased willingness to supply it. As the iceberg of crime rises to the surface of public visibility the need to bring new and more sophisticated resources to bear on the law enforcement task will become increasingly evident."

The sociological impact of crime causes societies to feel unsafe and demand the government protect its people from criminals, thus fueling the mass incarceration policy within the United States. There has been a steady increase in individuals who have been incarcerated; ideally, this benefits societies, but crime has exponentially increased over the last decade due to fear. Because individuals fear living in communities where small crimes are prevalent, these areas are often overlooked, and crime rates increase.

== Social influences on street crime ==
The motivation for street crimes has been explored by multiple studies, including a study cited by Iowa State University, where 55 street crime culprits were interviewed in order to determine the social links tied to street culture.

After interviewing those who participated in approximately 101 occurrences of street crimes, among the principal reasons for these crimes, including assault and robbery, were determined to be for societal status and recognition and thrill and excitement. The cultural viewpoint behind street crimes is built on the foundation that the intention of committing these acts comes from shared societal norms that support and reinforce violence. Street crimes are often amplified by the expansion and creation of gangs that propagate and reinforce these types of street culture behaviors.

Other factors that lead to street crimes are poverty, unemployment, and parental neglect. Crime rates in areas that are characterized by higher rates of unemployment and poverty are estimated to be greater than in other well-developed areas. There is a greater probability of unemployed adolescents not only being offenders but also victims of violence and street crimes. In addition, people with low self-control have a higher chance of committing street crimes. When individuals have low self-control, they tend to make decisions without thought, which leads to street crimes. Another underlying cause of street crime stems from parents who deal with more financial or social pressures, as they are at a higher risk of practicing poor parental techniques such as insufficient disciplinary actions, neglect, and ineffective supervision. Such parental actions are likely to increase the likelihood of teenage participation in street crimes.
