= Christ Church, Brixton Road =

Coordinates: 51°28′39″N 0°6′46″W

- Christ Church, North Brixton
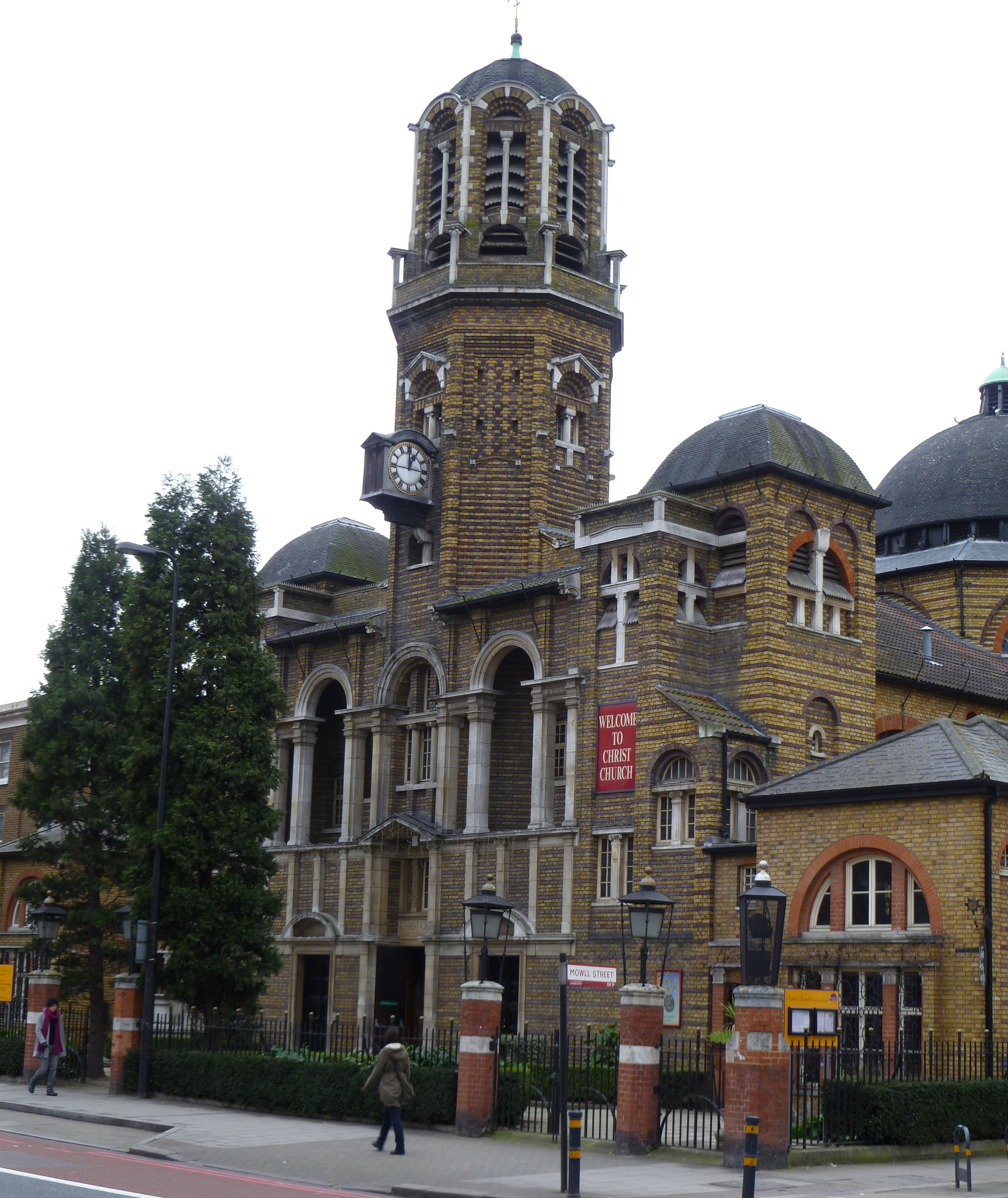
- Photo of the church
- Christ Church, Brixton Road
- Location: 96 Brixton Road, London SW9 6BE
- Country: England
- Denomination: Church of England

History
- Founder: Rev William Mowll

Architecture
- Architect: Arthur Beresford Pite
- Style: Neo-Byzantine
- Years built: 1899 - 1902

Administration
- Diocese: Anglican Diocese of Southwark
- Parish: Brixton Road

Clergy
- Vicar: Rev Tim Jeffreys

Christ Church on Brixton Road in Lambeth SW9 is an Art Nouveau and Byzantine Revival Grade II* listed building built in 1902 by Arthur Beresford Pite for his brother-in-law, Rev William Mowll. The foundation stone of the new church was laid on 13 December 1898 by Princess Helena, and the old church was demolished in 1899. The foundation stone, by Edward Johnston, was cut by Eric Gill in 1902. The church was consecrated by Edward Talbot, the Bishop of Rochester, on 5 December 1902. There is a prominent clock on the exterior of church, probably erected at the time of its construction. The outside pulpit in the south-west corner was designed by Weir, Burrows and Weir and was dedicated on 3 November 1907.

The present church was built on the site of an earlier chapel, formerly the independent Holland Chapel, which was sold to Anglicans in 1835, enlarged and renamed "Christ Church" in 1855. The foundation stone of the new church hall was laid on 24 July 1897, and the building was completed in 1899.

There are five stained glass windows in the church. One is St Paul preaching to the Athenians, by James Powell and Sons, which had been in the previous church building. The other four are by Clayton & Bell: The Good Samaritan, a companion pair of the Sacrifice of Isaac and the Presentation by Hannah of her son Samuel to Eli, and The Resurrection.

There was a Hunter organ in the earlier church, which was transferred to the new church in 1902. This was subsequently removed: it is now installed in St Osmund's Church, Derby. It was replaced by a Willis in 1919. This has been supplemented by a digital organ installed in 2007.

Located in a recent addition to the church is Café van Gogh, named in recognition of Vincent van Gogh, who lived briefly nearby at 87 Hackford Road, where there is now a Blue plaque and which is open to visitors.
