= DJ EBK =

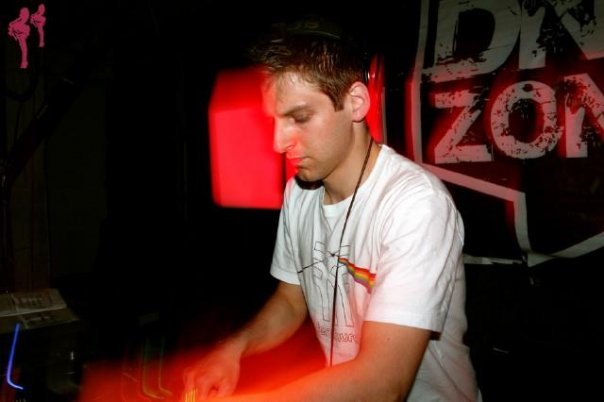
- EBK performing in Denmark, 2008

Background information
- Also known as: EBK
- Origin: London, United Kingdom
- Genres: Drum and bass
- Occupations: Producer, DJ, musician
- Years active: 1999 – Present
- Labels: Renegade Hardware; Dispatch Recordings; DSCI4 Recordings; Revolution Recordings; Compostie Records; Sudden Def Recordings; Defcom Records; Industry Records
- Website: www.facebook.com/djebk

EBK is a drum and bass producer and DJ from London, England, with 10 years of releases on influential labels including Renegade Hardware and Dispatch Recordings.

EBK is an abbreviation for E-Blok, which was EBK's DJ name in his early teens. It plays on the fact he is of Polish descent, hence Eastern Bloc.

== Biography ==
EBK cut his teeth as a teenager in the 1990s DJing Jungle on pirate and internet radio stations including Flex FM and interFACE (www.Pirate-Radio.org) before becoming the co-founder of Composite Records a label that at the turn of the millennium was an integral part of drum and bass's movement towards the rolling techno influenced subgenre now known as Neurofunk.

Following a number of releases on Renegade Hardware including 'Soma' and 'Blackboard Jungle' EBK came to prominence in 2007 with the release of '1000 Years' on Renegade Hardware's album 'Above The Game' along with his remix work for Sudden Def Records.

His tracks are played by DJs across the board and have got national radio support in the UK from broadcasters including Mary Anne Hobbs and the late John Peel.

== Discography ==
=== Releases ===
- 2000: Radium / Vision on Composite Recordings
- 2000: Kerbkrawler / Motor City on Composite Recordings
- 2001: 2000:2000 on Composite Recordings
- 2002: Underwater Lazers on Heads of Industry LP
- 2004: Hard Focus with Holdtight on Here Comes Trouble – Volume 12 | Trouble on Vinyl
- 2005: Apparition with Vicious Circle on Black Out EP – Volume 1 | Defcom Records
- 2006: Blackboard Jungle on Fear No Evil LP sampler | Renegade Hardware
- 2006: Cruise Control with Vicious Circle on Something Sick LP | DSCI4 Records
- 2006: Meltdown / Motel with Danny Holdtight on Tech Itch Records
- 2006: Powder People / Vacuum with Prolix on Powder to the People EP | Industry Records
- 2006: Soma on The Vendetta EP | Renegade Hardware
- 2007: 1000 Years on Above The Game LP | Renegade Hardware
- 2007: Lightly Salted (EBK Remix) on Sudden Def Recordings
- 2007: Skatter on Detrimental EP | Renegade Hardware
- 2008: Retina on Spy Technologies – Volume 5 | DSCI4 Records
- 2010: Hybrid on Revolution Recordings
- 2010: Mud on Dispatch Recordings
- 2010: Clouds on Renegade Hardware
- 2011: Mainframe with Octane & DLR feat. Gusto on Renegade Hardware
- 2011: Zulu Fade with Octane & DLR on Dispatch Recordings

== DJ performances ==
EBK has performed all over the United Kingdom and Europe, Thailand and India among other countries. In London, EBK is resident at club night Renegade Hardware.

His DJ sets cover a broad spectrum of styles often embracing elements including neurofunk, minimal, rolling and techno.
