= Brixton Road =

Street in Lambeth, London

Coordinates: 51°27′44″N 0°06′58″W

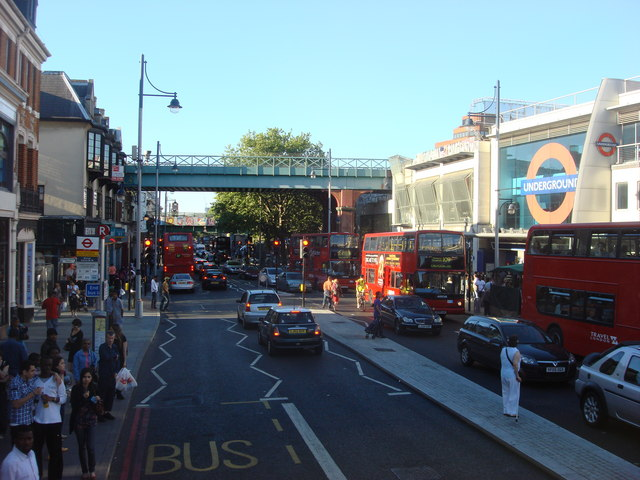
Brixton Road, looking north

Brixton Road is a road in the London Borough of Lambeth (south London, England), leading from the Oval at Kennington to Brixton, where it forms the high street and then forks into Effra Road and Brixton Hill at St Matthew's church at the junction with Acre Lane and Coldharbour Lane. Brixton Market is located in Electric Avenue near Brixton Underground station and in a network of covered arcades adjacent to the two railway viaducts. The market arcades were declared listed buildings in 2009 following controversial proposals by Lambeth Council to replace them with a large US-style mall. The former "Brixton Oval" is at the southern end with Lambeth Town Hall, the Ritzy Cinema, the Brixton Tate Library (with a statue of Henry Tate outside) and St Matthew's church. The space was renamed Windrush Square in 2010, in honour of the area's early Caribbean migrants and the HMT Empire Windrush, which in 1948 brought 492 passengers from Jamaica to London.

Brixton Road dates back to the Roman era when it was part of the London to Brighton Way. The River Effra used to be visible near Lambeth Town Hall, but is now underground, serving as a storm drain. Fronting Brixton Road at the north end is the Neo-Byzantine style Christ Church, opened in 1902. For much of its length Brixton Road remains lined by Regency period terraces of houses that once made a virtually continuous frontage from Kennington to Brixton. These had become semi-derelict by the 1970s when some were replaced, but many were refurbished by the Greater London Council, mostly as social housing.

Brixton Road is part of the A23.

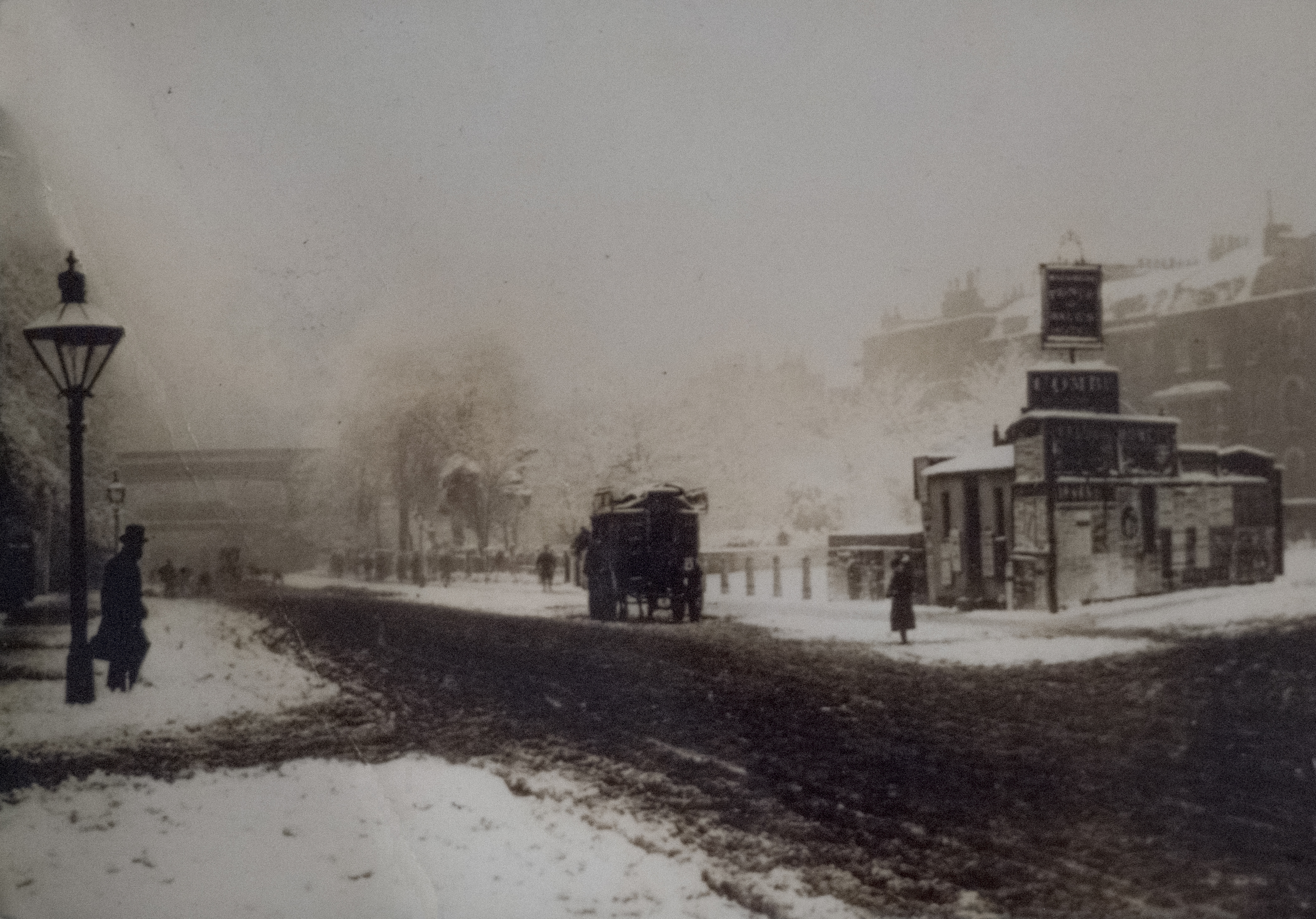
Brixton Road in 1883

In the 1887 detective novel A Study in Scarlet, an abandoned house off the Brixton Road is the very first of the numerous crime scenes appearing in the Sherlock Holmes books and stories.

== See also ==
- Brixton riot (1981)
