= Timeline of London (21st century) =

The following is a timeline of the history of London in the 21st century, the capital of England and the United Kingdom.

== Timeline ==
London's timeline in the 21st century.

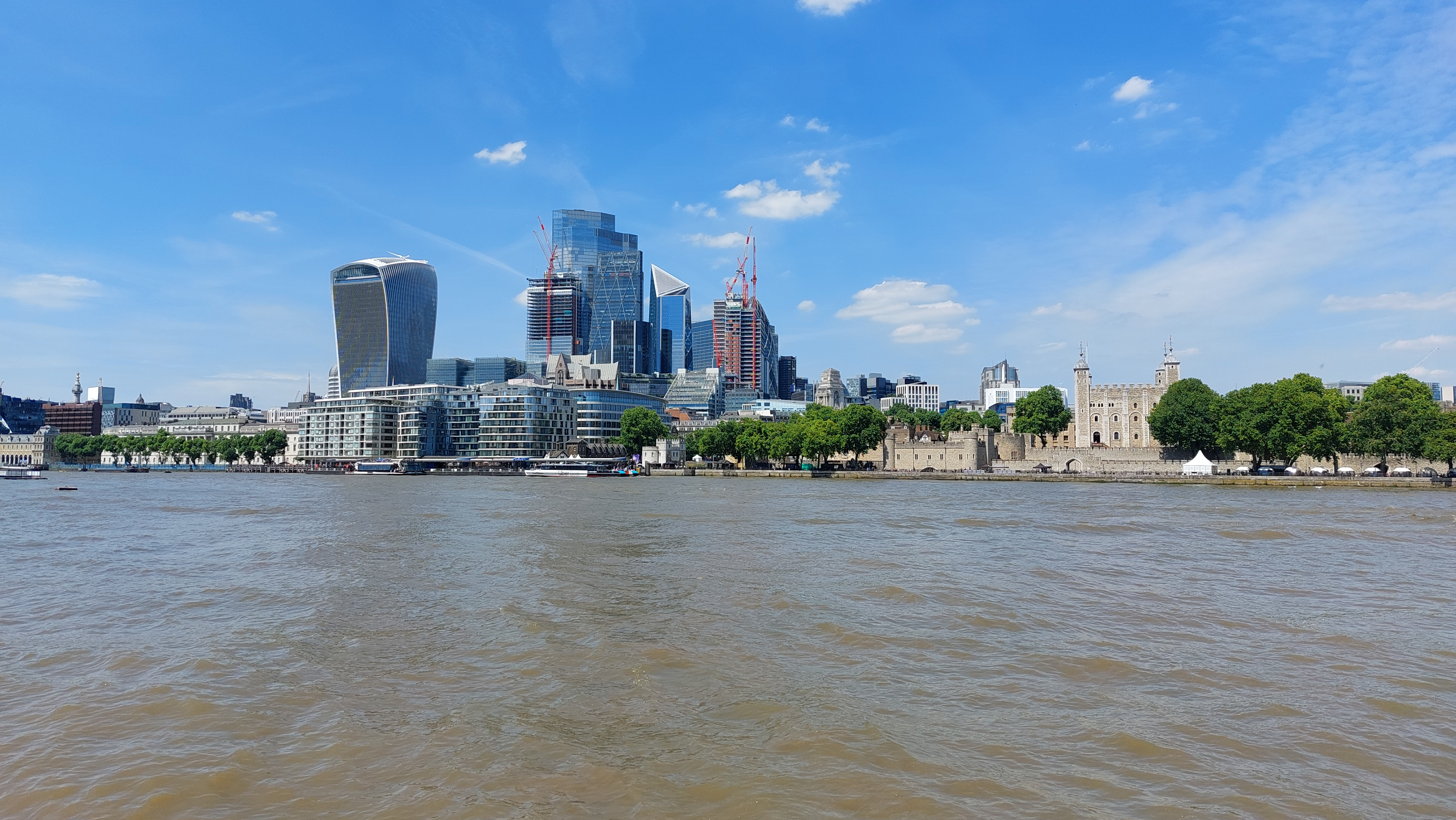
The skyline of the City of London, Thames, and Tower of London in June 2022. Taken from City Hall

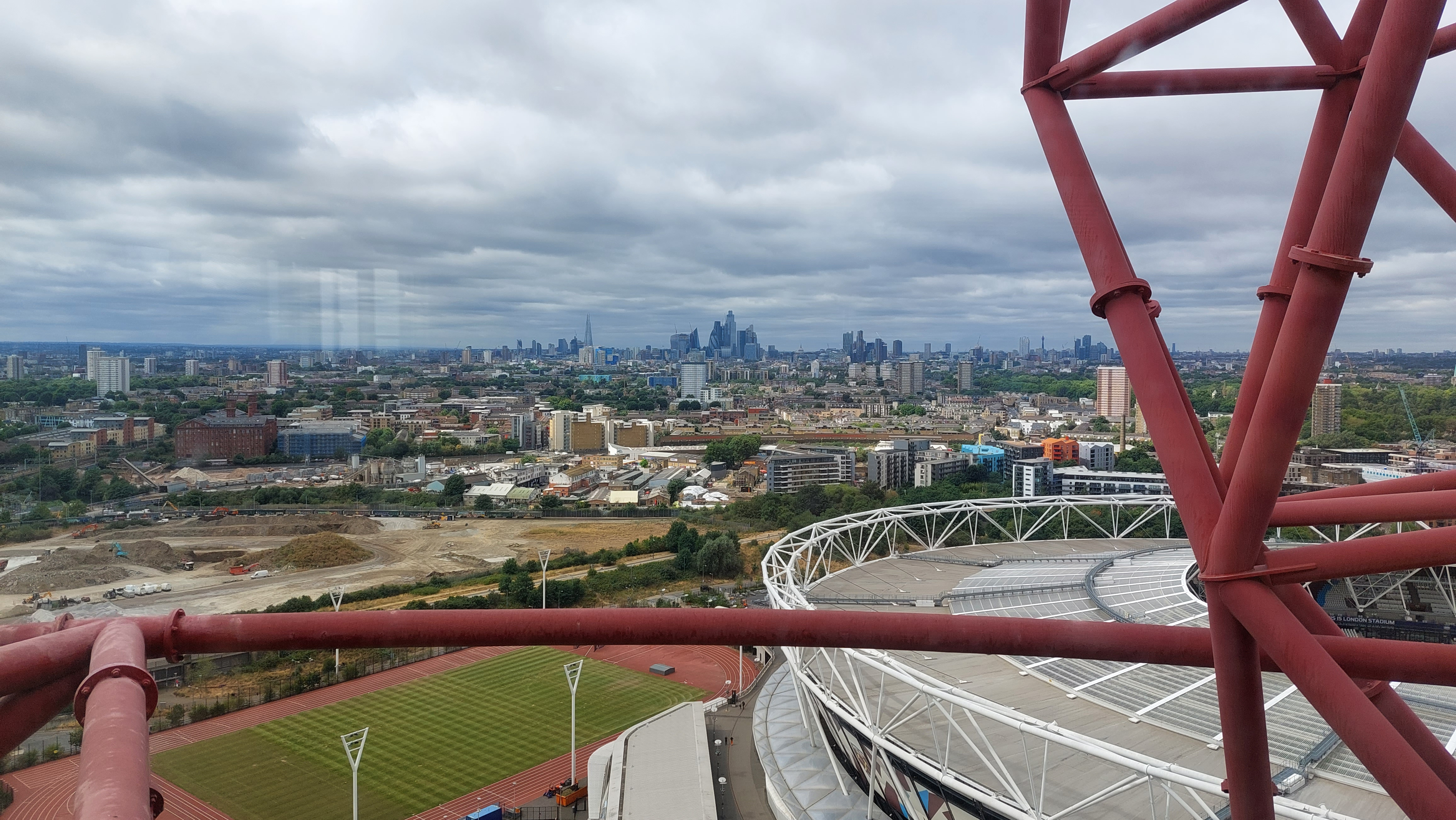
A view of London from the Arcelor Mittal Orbit, which was completed in 2012, in August 2022. Some of London's iconic buildings, including The Shard and St Paul's Cathedral, can be seen in the distance.

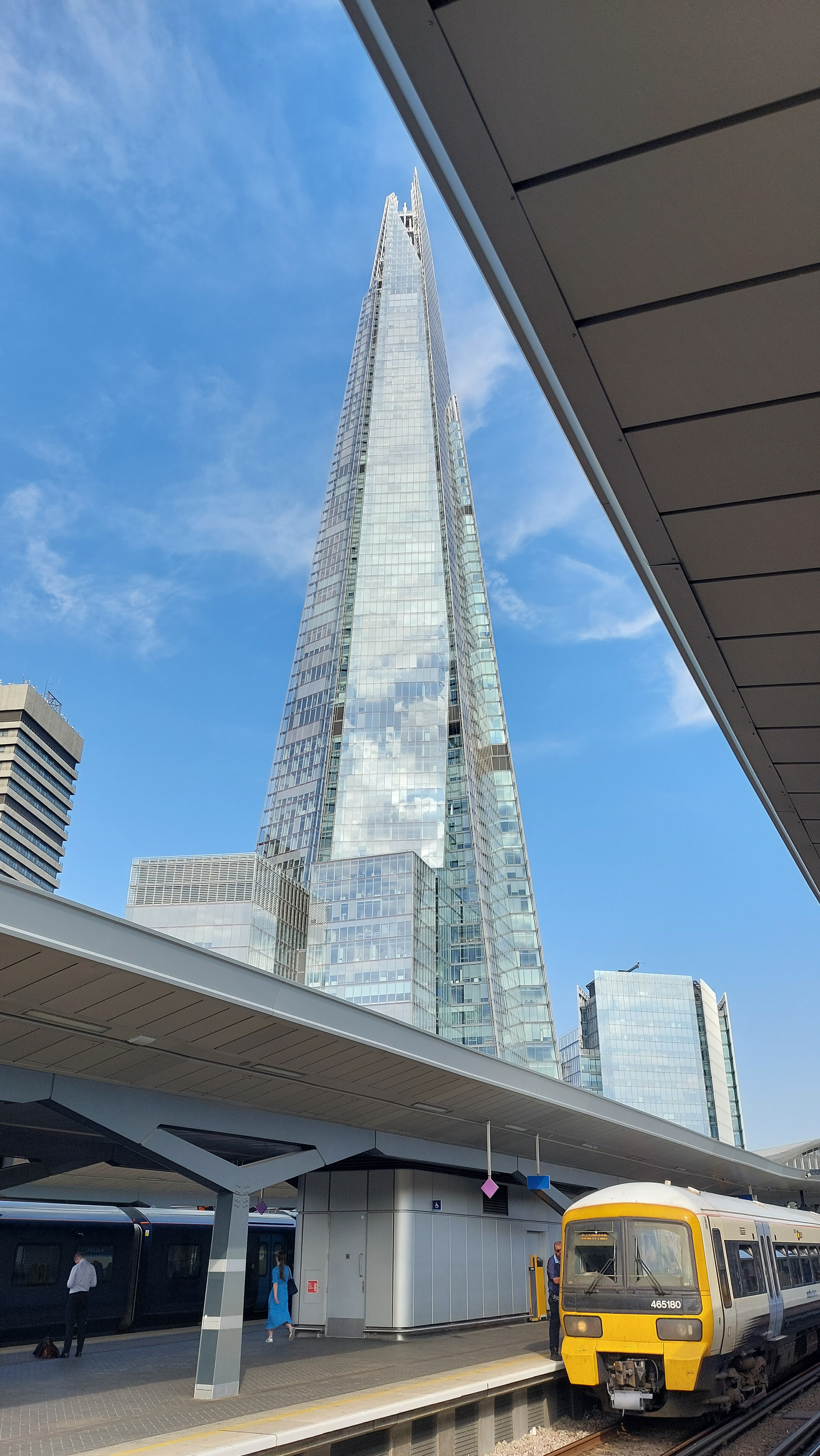
The Shard, which was completed in 2012, taken from London Bridge station in August 2022. The train in the foreground, a BR Class 465 bound for London Charing Cross, is just arriving at the station.

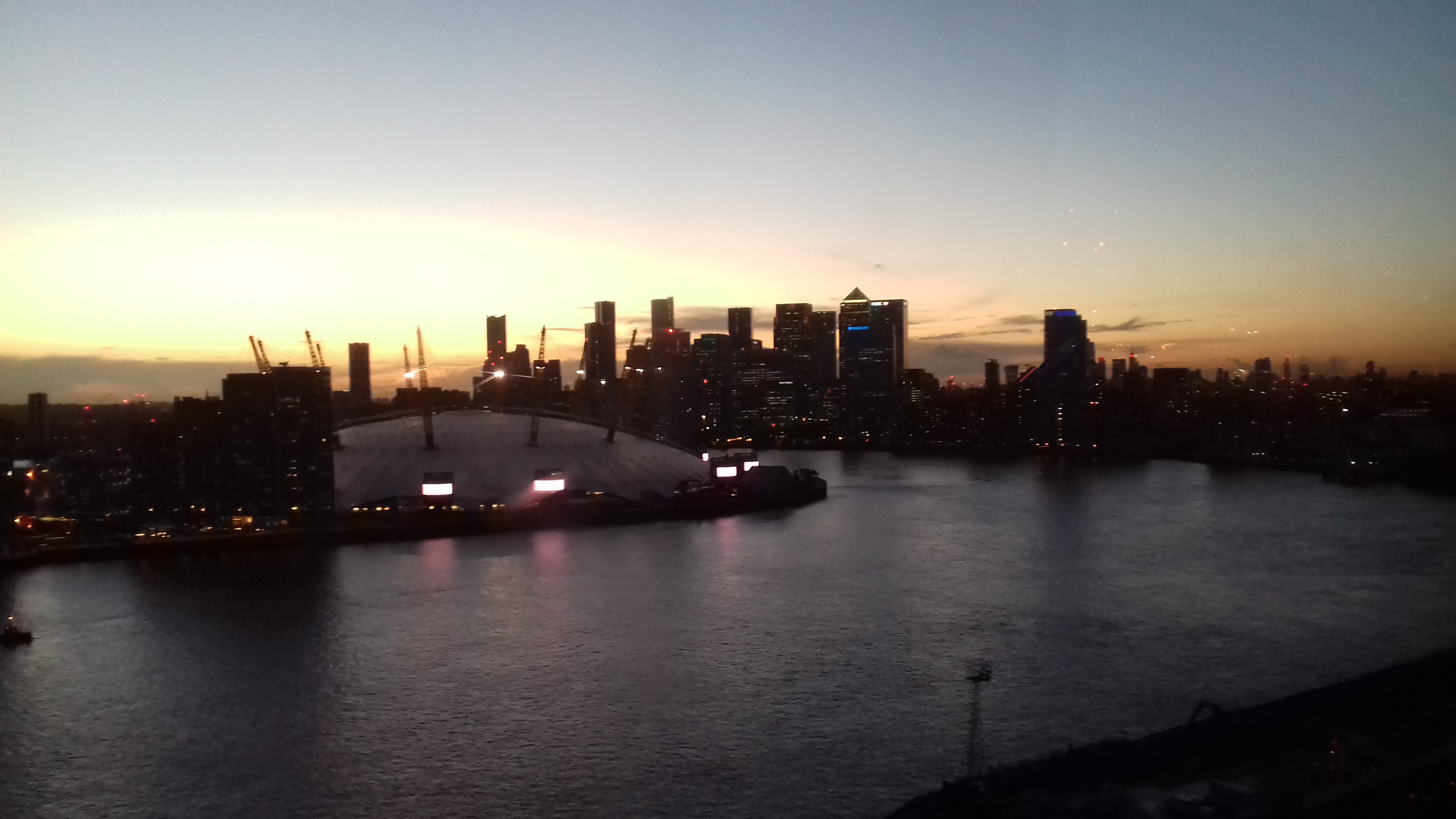
A view of the O2 Arena, Canary Wharf, and the Thames at twilight in November 2020. Taken from the IFS Cloud Cable Car, which at the time was sponsored by the airline Emirates.

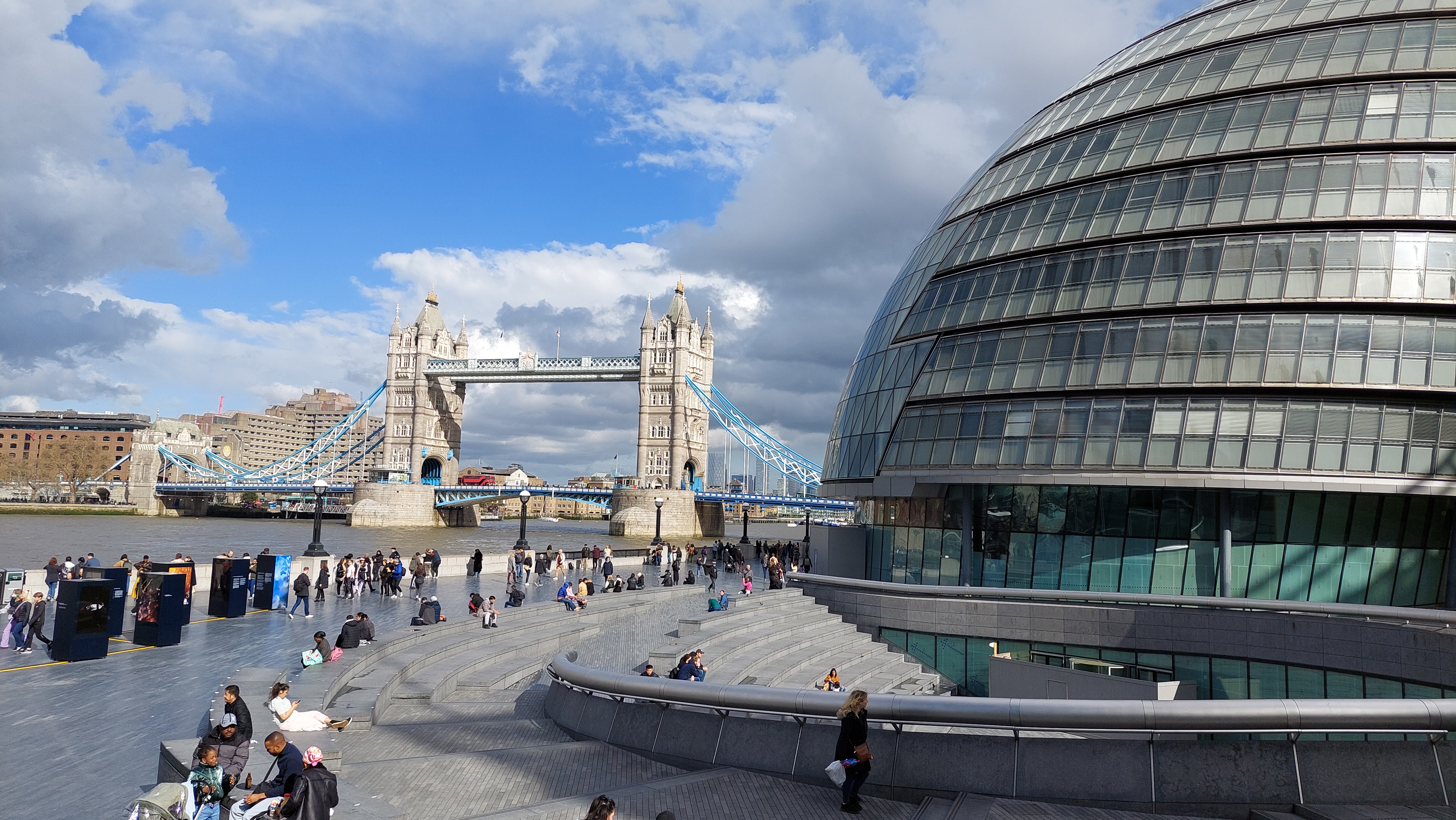
The former City Hall for the Greater London Authority between July 2002 and December 2021, with Tower Bridge in the background. Taken in April 2023.

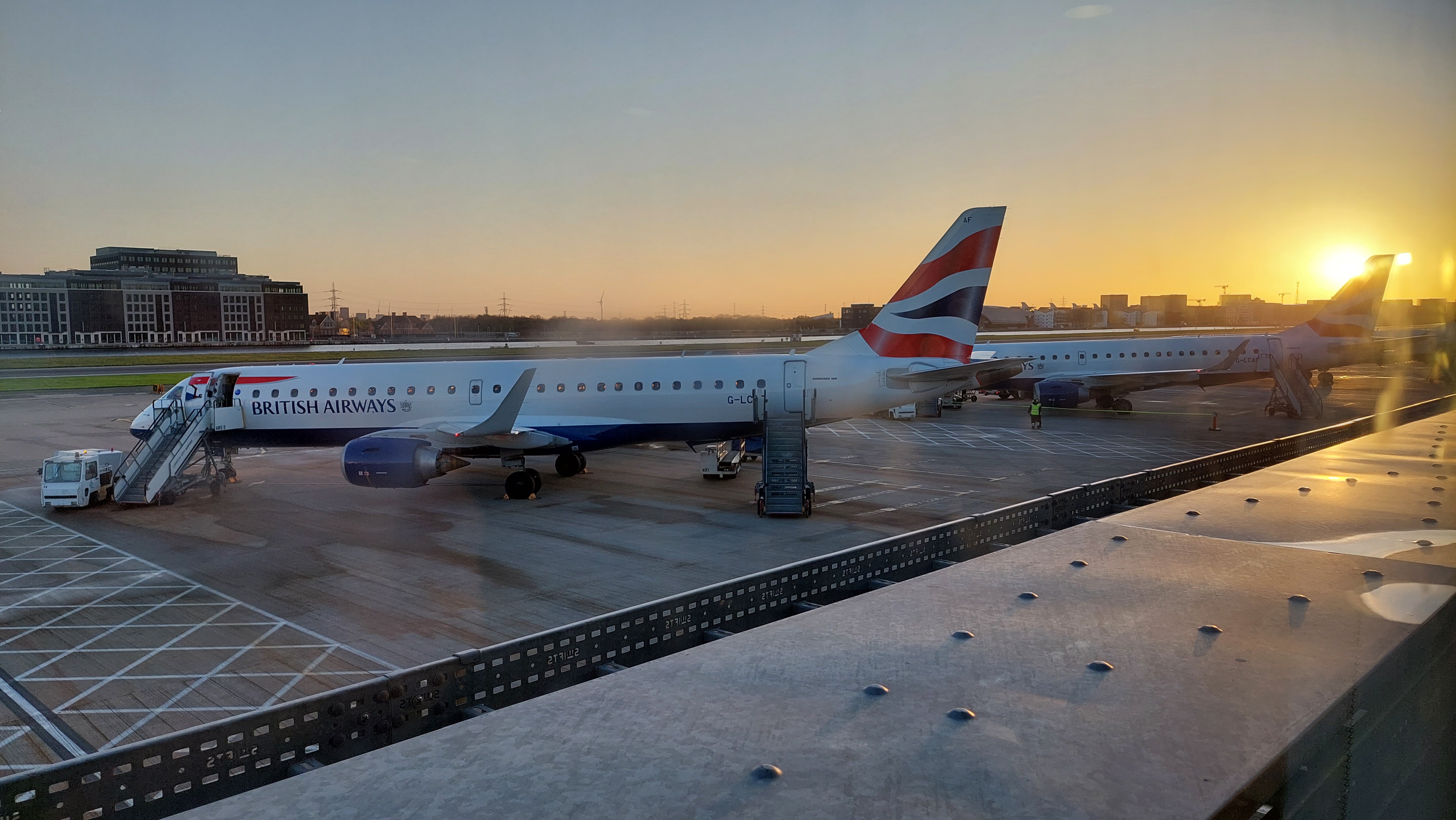
A couple of early morning BA flights at London City Airport at sunrise. Taken in April 2023.

== 2000 to 2009 ==
- 2000
  - 1 January: The Millennium Dome opens to the public on the Greenwich Peninsula.
  - 25 February: 8-year-old Victoria Climbié is murdered after she was tortured and neglected by her guardians, her aunt Marie Therese Kouao and Kouao's partner Carl Manning; Brent and Haringey social services departments will be severely criticised for their shortcomings in the case.
  - 8 March: Peckham Library opens; it is awarded the 2000 Stirling Prize.
  - 9 March: The London Eye ferris wheel opens to the public.
  - 22 April: Big Number Change: The STD codes 0171 and 0181 codes are replaced with 020 for the whole London telephone area.
  - 1 May: The May Day riot in central London by anti-capitalist protestors takes place; the statue of Winston Churchill in Parliament Square and the Cenotaph in Whitehall are daubed with graffiti.
  - 4 May: In the 2000 London mayoral election: Ken Livingstone, standing as an independent, becomes the first directly elected Mayor of London.
  - 11 May: Croydon Tramlink opens to public, the first tram network in London since 1952. This becomes part of Transport for London (TfL) in 2008.
  - 12 May: The Tate Modern art museum opens in the former Bankside Power Station.
  - 10 June: Millennium Bridge opens to pedestrians, but is closed after a few days for adaptation due to synchronous lateral excitation.
  - 3 July: The directly elected Greater London Authority is formed with Ken Livingstone as the Mayor of London. Transport for London is created as a functional body of the GLA and takes over the functions of London Regional Transport, the Public Carriage Office, traffic management and London River Services.
  - 20 July: Rioting breaks out in Brixton following the fatal shooting of Derek Bennett, a 29-year-old black man, by armed police in the area. 27 people are arrested, and 3 police officers are injured.
  - 7 November: Millennium Dome raid: The theft of £350 million worth of diamonds from the Millennium Dome is foiled by police.
  - 27 November: Damilola Taylor, a 10-year-old schoolboy originally from Nigeria, is stabbed to death on his way home from school in Peckham. In 2006, at a third trial, two brothers, aged 12 and 13 at the time of the killing, are convicted of manslaughter in the case.
  - ExCeL London exhibition centre opens at Royal Victoria Dock.
- 2001
  - 4 March: 2001 BBC bombing: A Real Irish Republican Army car bomb explodes outside BBC Television Centre in White City.
  - 3 August: 2001 Ealing bombing: A Real IRA car bomb explodes in Ealing Broadway.
  - 21 September: The torso of a 7-year old Nigerian boy, "Adam", who is believed to be the victim of ritual sacrifice, is found in the Thames.
  - 8 November: The Handel House Museum in Brook Street opens.
  - The Citigroup Centre is completed.
  - The Conservatoire for Dance and Drama, a national higher education institution, is established, the founding affiliates being the Royal Academy of Dramatic Art and the London Contemporary Dance School. Trinity College of Music moves to part of the Old Royal Naval College premises at Greenwich.
- 2002
  - 2 January: The Royal National Lifeboat Institution stations inland rescue boats on the Thames in London, at Teddington, Chiswick and Tower.
  - 9 April: The funeral procession of Queen Elizabeth The Queen Mother ends at Westminster Abbey after her death on 30 March at the age of 101.
  - May: First Idea Store community centre opens in Bow.
  - June: The Golden Jubilee of Elizabeth II takes place.
  - July: City Hall, the original headquarters of the Greater London Authority designed by Norman Foster, opens beside the Thames in Southwark.
  - 3 July: A man decapitates a statue of former Prime Minister Margaret Thatcher on display at Guildhall Art Gallery.
  - 1 August: London Metropolitan University is formed by merger of London Guildhall University and the University of North London.
  - 2 September: 8 Canada Square begins to be used by HSBC staff.
  - BedZED (Beddington Zero Energy Development), the country's first large-scale zero energy housing development, of 99 homes in Beddington, designed by Bill Dunster, is completed.
  - The last complete vehicle, a Ford Fiesta, leaves the Ford Dagenham production line.
  - 4 September: A thanksgiving service is held at St Martin-in-the-Fields in memory of the late John Thaw.
- 2003
  - 5 February: Arrests in the alleged Wood Green ricin plot.
  - 15 February 2003 anti-war protest: More than 2 million people demonstrate against the Iraq War, making it the largest demonstration in British history.
  - 17 February: The Congestion Charge is introduced.
  - 30 March: Gurdwara Sri Guru Singh Sabha Sikh Temple opens in Southall.
  - May: Transport for London sets up a Directorate of Traffic Operations to run road traffic management (including London Streets Traffic Control Centre), with some functions being transferred from the Metropolitan Police.
  - 31 May: Post Office Railway carries its last mail.
  - 10 August: The hottest day until 2022 in London is recorded, with 38.1°C (100.6°F) recorded in Royal Botanic Gardens, Kew.
  - 3 October: Baitul Futuh Mosque, Britain's largest, is inaugurated in Morden.
  - Redevelopment of Trafalgar Square is completed, the management of the central area becomes a responsibility of the Mayor of London, and the feeding of pigeons here is prohibited.
  - The old Wembley Stadium is demolished, and the rubble from it is used to build the hills at Northala Fields in Northolt (Borough of Ealing).
- 2004
  - 10 February: The London Plan is published.
  - 1 April: The Metropolitan Police takes over policing of The Royal Parks in Greater London from the Royal Parks Constabulary, which is formally dissolved in 2005.
  - 28 April: The landmark Swiss Re office building ("The Gherkin") at 30 St Mary Axe in the City, designed by Norman Foster, opens.
  - May: BBC Media Village opens in White City.
  - 11 May: The University of the Arts London is formed from the London Institute.
  - July: The London Stock Exchange moves to Paternoster Square.
  - September: The Daniel Gonzalez spree killings take place.
  - October: The South London gangs Ghetto Boys and Peckham Boys have a shootout outside the Urban Music Awards in the Barbican Centre.
  - 10 November: Temple Bar reinstalled in central London at Paternoster Square.
  - Pride London is established.
- 2005
  - 31 May: The Millennium Dome is renamed as the O2 Arena.
  - 6 July: The successful London bid for the 2012 Summer Olympics is announced.
  - 7 July 2005 London bombings: 56 people are killed in 4 suicide bombings on London Transport, the first Islamist terrorist attack in the UK.
  - 21 July 2005 London bombings: 4 further attempted bombings on London Transport, without casualties.
  - 22 July: Jean Charles de Menezes, mistaken for a terrorist suspect, is shot dead by Metropolitan Police officers on a train at Stockwell tube station.
  - Summer: Guinness closes its Park Royal brewery.
  - 5 November: A special £2 coin is released to mark the 400th anniversary of the failed Gunpowder Plot of 1605.
  - 9 December: Last AEC Routemaster buses in regular service in London are withdrawn.
  - The Cathedral of the Dormition of the Most Holy Mother of God and Holy Royal Martyrs (Russian Orthodox Diocese of Great Britain and Ireland) in Chiswick is fully consecrated.
- 2006
  - 20 January: A whale is discovered swimming in the Thames in London.
  - 25 September: Young's Ram Brewery in Wandsworth closes.
  - By October: The Daily Telegraph moves its offices from Canada Place in Canary Wharf (Docklands) to Victoria Plaza near Victoria station in central London.
  - 1 November: The former Russian spy Alexander Litvinenko is poisoned at the Millennium Hotel, Mayfair by Andrey Lugovoy and Dmitry Kovtun with Polonium-210. He is taken to Barnet Hospital, London before being moved to University College Hospital for intensive care, where he dies on 23 November.
  - 7 December: The London Tornado of 2006 strikes in Kensal Rise.
  - Donnybrook Quarter of the East End is completed by Peter Barber Architects.
  - Barkers of Kensington is closed down by its owners, House of Fraser.
- 2007
  - 9 March: The rebuilt Wembley Stadium opens.
  - 29 June: 2007 London car bombs: 2 car bombs are uncovered and defused in central London.
  - 11 November: The London Overground rail franchise begins operation of North London line. This also takes over the East London line in 2010 as well as the Lea Valley lines and the Romford–Upminster line in 2015.
- 2008
  - 16 January: The Rose Theatre, Kingston, opens.
  - 28 March: Heathrow Terminal 5 opens at the airport.
  - April: The Willis Building opens in the City.
  - 4 May: 2008 London mayoral election: Boris Johnson (Conservative) defeats Ken Livingstone to become Mayor of London.
  - 29 September: Children and staff are evacuated after a fire breaks out at Great Ormond Street Children's Hospital following a gas cylinder explosion in the cardiac wing.
  - 30 October: Westfield London shopping centre opens in White City.
- 2009
  - 10 January: The DLR's London City Airport branch begins operation.
  - 2 February: The February 2009 United Kingdom snowstorm hits London, and Transport for London suspends all London buses.
  - March: King's Health Partners is formed as an academic health science centre.
  - 1–2 April: The 2009 G20 London summit protests take place, with the 2009 G20 London summit being held at ExCeL London on 2 April.
  - 3 July: Lakanal House fire: A fire in a 14-storey block of flats in Camberwell (Borough of Southwark) causes 6 fatalities.
  - 17 September: The Brixton pound local currency is launched.
  - 12 October: The Evening Standard becomes a free newspaper in central London.
  - 9 November: Transport for London officially opens its new Surface Transport and Traffic Operations Centre (STTOC) at Palestra, Blackfriars Road to bringing together London Streets Traffic Control Centre (LSTCC), London Buses Command and Control Centre (CentreComm), and the Metropolitan Police Traffic Operation Control Centre (MetroComm).
  - The first No Trousers Tube Ride takes place in London.

== 2010 to 2019 ==
- 2010
  - April: HM Prison Isis completed as a young offenders' institution adjacent to HMP Belmarsh in Thamesmead.
  - June: The Strata ("The Razor"), a 148-metre, 43-storey, 408-flat skyscraper at Elephant and Castle in Southwark, that incorporates wind turbines into its structure, is completed.
  - 30 July: The Barclays Cycle Hire scheme is launched by Boris Johnson, Mayor of London.
  - September: Evelyn Grace Academy, a school in Brixton designed by Zaha Hadid, opens. It is awarded the 2011 Stirling Prize.
- 2011
  - January: The Heron Tower (110 Bishopsgate) is completed.
  - 26 March: The 2011 London anti-cuts protest takes place.
  - 27 March: United Kingdom Census 2011. 22.1% of the London population (1,730,000) have a tongue other than English as their first language, with Polish being the most widely spoken. Statistics also show that the city becomes the 2nd most densely populated city in the UK after Portsmouth in Hampshire.
  - 29 April: The Wedding of Prince William and Catherine Middleton takes place at Westminster Abbey.
  - 29 May: The parish church of St John Baptist in Croydon is raised to the honorific status of Croydon Minster.
  - 4 August: Death of Mark Duggan, shot by the police in Tottenham Hale, triggers the 2011 England riots.
  - 13 September: Westfield Stratford City shopping mall opens at Stratford.
  - 15 October: Occupy London begins.
  - 13 December: Trains on the Circle line (London Underground) cease to run in a complete circle, with trains running between Edgware Road station and Hammersmith Tube station.
  - The Georgian Orthodox Cathedral Church of the Nativity of Our Lord is established in the former Agapemonite Ark of the Covenant, which was later known as the Church of the Good Shepherd, in Upper Clapton.
  - Still Water, a giant bronze sculpture of a horse's head, is installed permanently at Hyde Park Corner.
- 2012
  - 3 February: The London Borough of Greenwich becomes the Royal Borough of Greenwich to mark the Diamond Jubilee of Elizabeth II.
  - 27 February: Transport for London's "New Routemaster" hybrid double-decker buses begin to enter public service.
  - 30 March: HM Prison Thameside opens.
  - 3 May: 2012 London Assembly election and 2012 London mayoral election are held, with Conservative candidate Boris Johnson winning his second term as mayor.
  - 3 June: The Thames Diamond Jubilee Pageant takes place.
  - 4 June: The Diamond Jubilee Concert takes place outside Buckingham Palace.
  - 28 June: The Emirates Air Line (cable car) opens across Thames between Royal Docks and Greenwich Peninsula.
  - 5 July: The Shard skyscraper is inaugurated.
  - 27 July: The 2012 Summer Olympics begin, based at the Queen Elizabeth Olympic Park in Stratford, lasting until 12 August.
  - 29 August: The 2012 Summer Paralympics begin, lasting until 9 September.
  - 10 September: Our Greatest Team Parade is held from Mansion House to Trafalgar Square.
  - September: The New College of the Humanities, a private university-level institution based in Bedford Square, begins tuition.
  - The porters at Billingsgate Fish Market lose their traditional monopoly.
- 2013
  - March: Regent's College (based in Regent's Park) is granted permission to become Regent's University London, a private charitable institution.
  - 22 May: Murder of Lee Rigby, a soldier, is committed by 2 Islamic extremists in Woolwich.
  - 10 September: The Worshipful Company of Educators becomes the 109th livery company of the City of London on being granted livery status by the Court of Aldermen.
  - 25 October: Lambeth slavery case: 3 women believed to have been held as slaves for the last three decades are rescued from a residence.
  - 28 October: St. Jude storm takes place; 2 people are killed in Hounslow.
  - 13 November: Groundbreaking for the new Embassy of the United States in London takes place in Nine Elms.
- 2014
  - 11 February: The Worshipful Company of Arts Scholars, which was recognised without livery in 2000, is constituted as a livery company of the city.
  - April–August: 20 Fenchurch Street (the "Walkie-talkie" office block), designed by Rafael Viñoly, is completed and occupied in the City.
  - July: 122 Leadenhall Street (the "Cheesegrater" office block) opens in the City.
  - 17 July–11 November: Installation art Blood Swept Lands and Seas of Red in the moat of the Tower of London.
  - November: Vivarail purchase 156 driving motor cars and 70 carriages of ex London Underground D78 Stock for conversion into the British Rail classes 230 and 484. (Some of these are taken over in February 2023 by Great Western Railway after Vivarail go into administration.)
  - Burntwood School, Wandsworth, designed by Allford Hall Monaghan Morris, is completed; it is awarded the 2015 Stirling Prize.
  - Hampstead hoax: False allegations of a Satanic paedophile ring are made.
  - The Cat Emporium (cat café) is in business.
- 2015
  - January: Earls Court Exhibition Centre dismantling begins.
  - 2 February: London's population reaches 8,600,000 and is forecast to reach 11,000,000 by 2050.
  - 1 April: Electrical fire under the Kingsway pavement.
  - 2 April: The Hatton Garden safe deposit burglary begins.
  - 29 June: Heathrow Terminal 1 closes after nearly 50 years of use to make way for the expansion of Terminal 2.
- 2016
  - 28 January: The Lee Tunnel, the first section of the Thames Tideway Scheme, opens.
  - 23 February: Crossrail is renamed as the Elizabeth line.
  - 9 May: 2016 London mayoral election: Sadiq Khan (Labour) elected Mayor of London.
  - 17 June: Tate Modern Switch House (art gallery extension, named the Blavatnik Building in 2017) on Bankside, designed by Herzog & de Meuron, opens.
  - 1 November: The Metropolitan Police Service returns its headquarters from New Scotland Yard in Broadway to the Curtis Green Building, on the original Scotland Yard site.
  - 24 November
    - The Design Museum reopens in the former Commonwealth Institute building in Kensington.
    - St Thomas Cathedral, Acton opens as Britain's first Syriac Orthodox cathedral in the former St Saviour's Centre for the Deaf.
- 2017
  - 22 February: Cressida Dick is appointed as first woman Commissioner of Police of the Metropolis.
  - 22 March: 2017 Westminster attack: A lone terrorist causes fatal injuries to 4 pedestrians in a vehicle-ramming attack on Westminster Bridge and fatally stabs a policeman on duty in New Palace Yard before being shot dead by police.
  - March: The London and South Coast Rail Corridor Study, which was commissioned by the Department of Transport (DfT), is released and lays out potential plans for Thameslink 2. If approved, this would see improved connectivity for London's growing economic hub in the Docklands and for Gatwick Airport as well as the growing travel demand between London, Gatwick and the south coast being met. This has an estimated cost of around £10,000,000,000 and would be completed by 2043.
  - 3 June: The 2017 London Bridge attack takes place, in which 3 terrorists cause fatal injuries to 8 people on London Bridge and in Borough Market in a vehicle-ramming attack and stabbings before being shot dead by police.
  - 14 June: Grenfell Tower fire: A fire engulfs a 24-storey block of flats in North Kensington with 71 fatalities eventually officially confirmed.
  - 19 June: The Finsbury Park attack takes place, a vehicle-ramming attack on Muslims leaving Tarawih prayer meetings in Finsbury Park with 1 fatality at the scene.
  - 15 September: The Parsons Green bombing takes place.
  - September: A small part of the London Post Office Railway reopens around the Mount Pleasant Sorting Office as part of the Post Office museum in Bloomsbury.
  - 18 October: Bridge Theatre opens.
  - 21 November: St Francis at the Engine Room in Tottenham Hale, the first new purpose-built Anglican parish church in London for 40 years, opens; it is intended as the first of 100 new churches in the diocese.
  - 18 December: Sarah Mullally is appointed as first woman Bishop of London; she is enthroned 12 May 2018 in St Paul's Cathedral.
- 2018
  - 7 February: Phase 1 of the National Grid's London Power Tunnels are complete, with 32km of tunnels linking electricity substations in Wimbledon and Hackney, are officially opened.
  - May: Ravensbourne University London is granted full university status.
  - Summer: A heat wave causes drought and hosepipe bans across the UK, including London.
  - November: Extinction Rebellion protests take place across central London.
  - 24 December: The District line celebrates 150 years of service since first opening as the District Railway.
- 2019
  - 2 April: Plans for London's newest skyscraper, The Tulip, are approved, with work to start as early as 2020 and a scheduled completion date of 2025. These are rejected by Sadiq Khan, Mayor of London on 15 July.
  - 3 April: The new Tottenham Hotspur Stadium opens.
  - 15–26 April: Extinction Rebellion protests across London cause disruption around major tourist areas, including Piccadilly Circus, the Houses of Parliament, Marble Arch and the Stock Exchange.
  - 10 August: A major power cut hits London and the South-East, with the principal railway termini and TfL network being greatly affected with many severe delays and cancellations.
  - 29 November: 2019 London Bridge stabbing: Terrorist Usman Khan stabs 5 people, 2 fatally, within and outside Fishmongers' Hall before being shot dead by City police.

== 2020 to 2029 ==
- 2020
  - 13 January: London Power, established in July 2019 as a subsidiary of the Greater London Authority, begins supplying electricity and gas from Octopus Energy to London customers.
  - COVID-19 pandemic in London:
    - 12 February: The first case of COVID-19 in London is confirmed in a woman recently arrived from China. By 17 March, there are almost 500 confirmed cases and 23 deaths. On 23 March, London goes into a nationwide lockdown with the rest of the UK.
    - 3 April: NHS Nightingale Hospital London opens in ExCeL London and remains operational for a month.
    - 11 April: The number of people with COVID-19 in London hospitals reaches its peak.
    - 15 October: It is announced that the city is moving to the Tier 2 (high) level of restriction under the first COVID-19 tier regulations in England.
    - 5 November: The city joins the rest of the UK in a nationwide lockdown that lasts until 2 December in an attempt to reduce the number of cases.
    - 8 December: 81-year-old Lyn Wheeler is the first person to receive a COVID-19 vaccine at Guy's Hospital outside of trials as a national programme begins rollout.
    - 15 December: By this date, there have been almost 211,000 confirmed cases and more than 7,400 deaths in London hospitals.
    - 16 December: The Greater London area and some regions surrounding it move to the Tier 3 (very high) level of restriction under the "all tiers regulations". From 20 December, it moves up to new Tier 4.
  - 29 July: Brentford F.C. play their last match at Griffin Park before moving to Brentford Community Stadium.
  - 18 September: The Thameslink Programme, an 11-year project to improve the capacity and facilities of the train operating company Thameslink, is completed. This has seen the major redevelopment of some of the stations along the Thameslink core between St Pancras International and Blackfriars stations, the closure of the Moorgate branch and the platforms at King's Cross Station, and the introduction of new and longer trains alongside other major infrastructure work.
  - 3 November: It is announced that the London Assembly will move from City Hall, Southwark, to The Crystal at the Royal Victoria Dock by the end of next year to save on rent.
- 2021
  - COVID-19 pandemic in London:
    - 2 January: Schools in London are to remain closed after a government U-turn in their decision to keep primary schools open.
    - 4 January: Prime Minister Boris Johnson announces that London, along with the rest of the UK, will go into a third nationwide lockdown to control the new variants of COVID-19 from 6 January, which will last until at least the Spring.
    - 8 January: The Mayor of London declares a 'major incident' as medical services in London face being overwhelmed.
    - January: NHS Nightingale Hospital London is returned to operation in ExCel London for recuperating patients. It is closed again by April after cases in London kept dropping.
    - 22 February: Prime Minister Boris Johnson announces plans to bring the UK, including London, cautiously out of lockdown, with plans for restrictions to be fully lifted by 21 June.
    - 23 March: London residents commemorate the first anniversary of the COVID-19 lockdown with a candlelight vigil to remember those who lost their lives during the pandemic along with the rest of the UK.
    - 14 June: Plans to end COVID-19 restrictions are delayed by 4 weeks to 19 July due to a sharp rise of the Delta variant.
    - 19 July: COVID-19 restrictions in England, including London, come to an end after Prime Minister Boris Johnson confirms this on 12 July.
  - 1 January: Thousands complain to the BBC that the fireworks and light show on some of London's landmarks to bring in 2021 are too political.
  - January: London City Airport becomes the first major airport controlled by a remote air traffic control tower, which is located in Swanwick, Hampshire.
  - 3 February: Some of London's icons light up the colours of the Union flag to commemorate the death of 100-year-old war veteran Captain Sir Tom Moore, who died on 2 February and raised more than £32 million for the NHS in 2020.
  - 3 March: 33-year-old Sarah Everard is kidnapped on Clapham Common, with her remains being found a week later near Ashford, Kent. 48-year-old Wayne Couzens, a Metropolitan Police officer, is charged with her murder and is found guilty on 9 July before being sentenced to life imprisonment with a whole life order at the Old Bailey on 29 September.
  - 9 April: Buckingham Palace announces the death of Prince Philip, Duke of Edinburgh in Windsor at the age of 99, and several buildings, including Piccadilly Circus and the BT Tower, light up in black to commemorate his life.
  - 6 May: The London Mayoral elections take place, with Labour candidate Sadiq Khan winning his second term.
  - 15 May: The London department store Debenhams (previously Debenham and Freebody) ceases trading after more than 200 years.
  - 11 July: The UEFA Euro 2020 Final takes place at Wembley Stadium, with England losing to Italy 3–2 in penalties.
  - September and October: Insulate Britain protests: Insulate Britain protesters block various junctions of the M25 motorway (London orbital) multiple times as well as causing chaos across London and the rest of the UK.
  - 11 September: 67 candles are lit in London on the 20th anniversary of the 9/11 attacks on the World Trade Center in New York City to remember the 67 British victims who died.
  - 20 September: The London Underground's Northern line extension to Battersea Power Station via Nine Elms station opens, making it the first new extension on the network since 2008.
  - 12 October: London's New Year's Eve fireworks display are announced to be cancelled for the second year running.
  - 28–30 October: The Polar research vessel Sir David Attenborough moors in Greenwich for the COP26 climate change summit taking place in Glasgow.
  - 11 November: Michael Gove rejects the proposal to build The Tulip skyscraper in the City of London on behalf of the Government.
  - 2 December: The Greater London Authority vacate City Hall and relocate to The Crystal in Newham.
  - 8 December: Prime Minister Boris Johnson announces plan B of COVID-19 restrictions due to a sharp increase of the Omicron variant, and Mayor Sadiq Khan declares a 'major incident' in London on 18 December.
  - 30 December: 2 boys die after being stabbed in separate incidents in London, which brings the total teenage homicides in the capital this year to 30 and surpasses the 2008 peak of 29.
  - Uber Boat by Thames Clippers start services towards Gravesend and Tilbury.
- 2022
  - 1 January: After extensive restoration work, Big Ben bongs for the first time since 21 August 2017 alongside the other New Year events to bring in 2022.
  - 9 January: The Marble Arch Mound closes after a string of controversy and disappointment, and is dismantled in the weeks following.
  - 15 January: The Bank branch of the Northern line closes for major upgrade work, which then reopens on 16 May.
  - 26 January: COVID-19 pandemic in London: Plan B measures for COVID-19 restrictions across the UK, including London, come to an end after Prime Minister Boris Johnson announces this on 18 January following a decline in the Omicron variant.
  - 10 February: Cressida Dick announces her resignation as Commissioner of Police of the Metropolis just hours after denying her intention of doing so, officially stepping down on 10 April with her replacement to be announced in due course.
  - 18 February: Part of The O2 Arena's roof is damaged as a result of strong winds during Storm Eunice, reaching up to 90mph (145kmh). 2 people are also injured by debris in Streatham and Waterloo.
  - 24 February: Prime Minister Boris Johnson removes the last of the COVID-19 restrictions (compulsory isolation with a positive test) in London and the rest of the UK.
  - 26 February: Some of London's icons light up in the colours of the flag of Ukraine in response to the Russian invasion of Ukraine a few days prior.
  - 6 March: Queen Elizabeth II permanently moves from Buckingham Palace to Windsor Castle.
  - 21 March: A thanksgiving ceremony takes place in Westminster Abbey in memory of the late Vera Lynn.
  - 29 March: A thanksgiving ceremony takes place in Westminster Abbey in memory of the late Prince Philip, Duke of Edinburgh.
  - 30 March: Large areas of London suffer from a power cut due to a sub-station catching fire.
  - 7 April: The Jubilee line is the first Underground line to have a 4G mobile network between Westminster and Canning Town following a successful trial, with other lines to follow suit in the following years.
  - 16 April: Extinction Rebellion protests take place across central London.
  - 26 April: Thames Clippers start using Barking Riverside pier, with the branch line of the London Overground from Barking to Barking Riverside station via Renwick Road station fully opening on 18 July.
  - 24 May: The central section of Crossrail/the Elizabeth line between Paddington and Abbey Wood officially opens after many years of delays and a massive overbudget.
  - 1 June-18 September: Over 20,000,000 seeds are sown in the moat of the Tower of London for the Superbloom exhibition as part of the Platinum Jubilee of Elizabeth II. On 28 October, the Tower of London announces that the flowers will return in the summer of 2023 due to its success this year.
  - 2–5 June: The Platinum jubilee of Elizabeth II is celebrated with a bank holiday weekend, events around Buckingham Palace, and street parties across London and the rest of the UK.
  - 5 June: A man dies after falling into the Thames after being tasered by the police on Chelsea Bridge.
  - 26 June: The 1972 tube stock reaches 50 years of service on the Bakerloo line, making them the oldest trains on not only the London Underground, but also on the UK railway network.
  - 28 June: The Metropolitan Police is subjected to an advanced level of monitoring, a form of special measures, by HM Inspectorate of Constabulary.
  - Summer: A heat wave affects London and the rest of the UK:
    - 19 July: The UK's temperature reaches 40°C (104°F) at Heathrow Airport for the first time in the country's and city's history. Also for the first time its history, London is one of the hottest places on Earth, with major fires breaking out across outer London.
    - 22 July: A cooling system trial for the deepest Tube lines, set up at the abandoned platform at Holborn tube station, begins in response to the extreme heat.
    - 12 August: A drought is officially declared in the south of England, including London, during the second heatwave of this year, with a hosepipe ban being introduced on 24 August.
  - 2 July: Over 1,000,000 people attend the LGBT Pride march to celebrate the 50th anniversary of Pride London, which closely follows the original 1972 route and is the largest turnout in the event's history.
  - 12 July: An electrical fire breaks out under Regent Street; it is extinguished around an hour after the first calls come in.
  - 18 July: Barking Riverside station opens a few months ahead of schedule, making it the first extension on the London Overground since 2015.
  - 20 July: A flat in Woolwich and near London City Airport catches fire, and over 100 firefighters are called.
  - 31 July: At the UEFA Women's Euro 2022 final in Wembley Stadium, England beat Germany 2-1 during extra time to win this year's competition. On 1 August, their victory parade takes place from their hotel in Teddington to Trafalgar Square.
  - 7 August: Around 70 firefighters battle a huge fire that breaks out near Heathrow Airport after an ‘explosion’ was heard. Although some flights are diverted, there is no serious damage to any property.
  - 8–12 August: The Swedish sailing ship Göteborg, the world's largest ocean-going wooden sailing ship, visits London as part of the history of the East India Companies and the adventures of the original ship exhibition.
  - 11 August: Children between the ages of 1 and 9 are offered a polio vaccine after 116 samples of the vaccine-like poliovirus have been detected in the sewage water in 8 of London's boroughs between February and July of this year.
  - 17 August: A fire near London Bridge station severely disrupts rail services in the area.
  - 1 September: The Swedish technology firm IFS is announced as the new sponsor for the London Cable Car, which started the following month.
  - 3 September: A tribute concert for Taylor Hawkins of the Foo Fighters takes place at Wembley Stadium.
  - 8 September: Buckingham Palace announces the death of Queen Elizabeth II at Balmoral Castle at the age of 96, with Charles, Prince of Wales succeeding her as monarch to become King Charles III at age 73. Various buildings across London, including the BT Tower, light up in black to commemorate her life, several memorials are set up around the city, and in the days following, tributes from world leaders pour in.
  - 19 September: The funeral procession of Queen Elizabeth II takes place from the Palace of Westminster to Wellington Arch and travels along Broad Sanctuary, Parliament Square, Whitehall, Horse Guards Parade and Road, The Mall and Constitution Hill.
  - 24 September: At dusk, over 150 boats decorated with white lights celebrate the Platinum Jubilee of Elizabeth II on the river as part of the Totally Thames festival.
  - September: Murder of Shakira Spencer in Ealing.
  - September to late 2023: Victoria station undergoes a £30,000,000 renovation to improve station capacity alongside resignalling work.
  - 14 October: The shopping centre inside the renovated Battersea Power Station opens nearly 40 years after it was decommissioned, with a food hall expected to open in 2023.
  - 24 October: Bond Street Elizabeth line station officially opens.
  - 30 October: Just Stop Oil protestors block Charing Cross Road, Kensington High Street, Harleyford Street and Blackfriars Road demanding that the government halt oil drilling licenses. On 31 October, a judge orders 180 protesters to stop blocking these roads.
  - 1 November: Plans are announced for the Wonder of Friendship exhibition to take place in London in May 2023 to celebrate the 100th anniversary of Walt Disney Pictures.
  - 2 November: A fully electric version of the Boris Routemaster bus is unveiled by Transport for London (TfL), with passengers expected to travel on it by December.
  - 6 November: The Elizabeth line connects its central section to the rest of its network to provide a direct service from Reading and Heathrow Airport in the west to Shenfield and Abbey Wood in the east. A peak service of 24 trains per hour at Whitechapel will be introduced on 24 May 2023 to fully complete the project 14 years after its construction began.
  - 9 November: Nurses in some of London's major hospitals vote to strike around Christmas, making it their first strike since 1916.
  - 10 November: Greenwich Park announces plans to restore a set of giant grass steps dating back to the 17th century as part of a wider restoration project due to be completed in 2025.
  - 16 November: Gravesend's town pier, the world's oldest surviving cast iron pier, is purchased by Uber Boat by Thames Clippers, with plans to establish a ferry service to London by 2025.
  - 18 November: Plans to move the Billingsgate Fish Market and Smithfield Meat Market to a new site in Dagenham are approved by the City of London, with plans to open them between 2027 and 2028.
  - 4 December: The Museum of London closes its doors for the last time before its move to its new location in Smithfield as The London Museum.
  - 11/12 December: Heavy snowfall during the night causes chaos on London's transport system in the days following, with numerous cancellations on the railways, Tube and buses.
  - 14 December: The pedestrianisation in The Strand is completed and opened for public use.
  - December: Floods across London due to the snow cause hundreds of people to evacuate, continuing into January 2023.
  - London's mainline railway services are affected during the National Union of Rail, Maritime and Transport Workers (RMT) rail strikes throughout this year.
- 2023
  - 1 January: The New Year fireworks return to London after being cancelled for 2 years due to COVID-19.
  - 10 January: Transport for London (TfL) announce a series of activities throughout 2023 to celebrate the 160th anniversary of the London Underground. Mayor Sadiq Khan also meets up with 4 employees of TfL who have a combined total of 160 years of service.
  - 26 January: St Mark's Church, Hamilton Terrace in St John's Wood is gutted by fire.
  - 13 February: The long-running London bus drivers' dispute ends after an 18% pay deal is agreed on.
  - 22 March: Battersea Dogs & Cats Home receives over £100,000 in donations following the death of its ambassador Paul O’Grady.
  - 24 March: Plans are announced to give each of the London Overground lines separate names to differentiate them from each other on TfL maps.
  - 25 April: The hosepipe ban from the heatwave of 2022 comes to an end in London.
  - 28 April:
    - Detailed maps of London’s Superloop bus service are released.
    - It is announced that HMV's flagship store on Oxford Street is to reopen by the end of the year.
  - April:
    - Many of London's bus routes are cut back due to TfL budget cuts.
    - London City Airport becomes the first major UK airport to drop its 100-millilitre liquid rule, with the new limit now being 2 litres.
  - 3 May: Three sections of the Roman Wall in the City of London are given protected status.
  - The coronation of King Charles III:
    - December 2022: The King Edwards Crown is removed from the Tower of London for resizing.
    - February: The Queen Mary's Crown is removed from the Tower of London for resizing and modification for Queen Camilla, making it the first time a queen is crowned using another consort's crown since 1727.
    - 5 April: The official invitation for the coronation is sent to around 2,000 guests.
    - 14 April: The official commemorative range for the coronation is released by Royal Collection Shop.
    - 27 April: A map is released of the road closures for the precession on 6 May. Some TfL roundels have also been redesigned as the 'crowndel', which bears the likeness of the St Edward's Crown.
    - 28 April: The historic Stone of Scone is moved from Edinburgh Castle to London.
    - 17 April–3 May: Thousands of military personnel come together on the streets of London at night to practice the ceremonial support for the coronation.
    - 4 May: It is announced that the Type 45 destroyer HMS Diamond will be based on the Thames during the coronation to defend the King from attacks.
    - 5 May: Ireland's president Michael D. Higgins meets King Charles III the night before the coronation, with many other world leaders attending a reception on the same night.
    - 6 May: The coronation of King Charles III and Camilla takes place in Westminster Abbey. During the event, anti-Monarchy protests take place.
    - 6–7 May: Tower Bridge, London Bridge, the Guildhall and Mansion House are illuminated in red, white and blue on these evenings.
  - 12 May: Archbishop of Canterbury Justin Welby is convicted of speeding after being caught on the Albert Embankment in Lambeth on 2 October 2022.
  - 17 May: Big Ben stops chiming for the second time in a month despite the recent renovations.
  - 21 May: The Elizabeth line is officially completed, which now sees a total of 24 trains per hour passing through the central tunnels between Reading and Heathrow Airport in the west, and Shenfield and Abbey Wood in the east. There are also plans to increase this number to 32 trains an hour as well as extending the trains from the current 9 carriages to 11 carriages.
  - 22 June: It is confirmed that a food hall will open in Battersea Power Station in July following the success of its first branch on Tottenham Court Road.
  - 22 July: Plans are announced to phase out the London day travelcards, which currently sees Transport for London (TfL) lose £40,000,000 each year. After discussions between TfL, train operators and the Government on 24 October, it is announced that they will be retained with a fairer share going to TfL.
  - 29 July: The High Court of Justice rules that Mayor Sadiq Khan's plan to expand the ULEZ zone to London's suburbs is lawful.
  - 31 July: London’s Jewish Museum in Camden closes after almost 30 years.
  - 2 August: A Jubilee line train accidentally enters the closed Charing Cross platforms with passengers due to a miscommunication.
  - 8 August: Hyde Park is voted the best park in the UK.
  - 9 August: London Underground drivers vote to continue striking for another 6 months alongside mainline railway drivers.
  - 18-20 August: The Shard lights up with the St George's Cross (England flag) to support The Lionesses at the Women's World Cup final at the Stadium Australia in Sydney.
  - 29 August: The Ultra Low Emission Zone (ULEZ) expands to cover the entirety of London. By doing this, the city becomes the world's largest pollution charging area.
  - 8 September: Plans are announced to expand the 4G and 5G mobile network to more of the London Underground network, including the recently completed Elizabeth line.
  - 12 September: Earth Clipper becomes the first of three battery-powered ferries to be operated by Uber Boat by Thames Clippers. With zero tailpipe emissions, it produces 90% lower CO_{2} emissions compared to the other Thames based high speed catamarans.
  - 15-19 September: Bond Street station is temporarily renamed as Burberry Street to coincide with London Fashion Week.
  - 20 September: It is announced that Heathrow Airport is the world's best connected airport after it held that title in 2019.
  - 4 October: At the Conservative Party conference, Prime Minister Rishi Sunak announces that HS2's platforms at Euston railway station will be built after the Birmingham to Manchester leg is scrapped.
  - 9 October: London is voted as the best city in the world for the eighth year running.
  - 12 October: The Football Association (FA) are branded as "spineless" for refusing to light up Wembley Stadium's arch in the colours Israel's flag.
  - 13 October: The Disney100 exhibition opens at ExCeL London and runs until 21 January 2024 (inclusive).
  - 14 October: A Pro-Palestinian group targets the BBC's London headquarters with red paint during a protest following Israel's attack on Palestine and Gaza.
  - 15 October: Beavers are released in Ealing's Paradise Fields, making them the first beavers to be in London for 400 years.
  - 7 November: Transport for London offer auditions for buskers on the Tube for the first time since 2017.
  - 14 November: A list of 10 buildings in London are added to the 'at risk' list, which brings the total to 599.
  - 2 December: An arson attack on a tube train leaves one of its carriages damaged.
  - 26 December: Central London sees a 10.6% increase in footfall and sales compared to 2022.
  - 30 December:
    - A shooting star is visible from London as well as Birmingham and Kent.
    - Eurostar and Southeastern High Speed services from St Pancras International station return after various floods across Southern England from Storm Henk.
  - London's mainline railway services continue to be affected as the National Union of Rail, Maritime and Transport Workers (RMT) rail strikes continue into this year.
- 2024
  - 2 January:
    - It is announced that the Rotherhithe Tunnel could close until early 2025 due to urgent repairs.
    - A roof hatch on the London Eye blows off due to the high winds of Storm Henk.
  - 31 January: Clapham alkali attack.
  - 1 March to 23 June: The Disney100 exhibition runs for the second time at ExCeL London.
  - 14 May: The London School of Economics (LSE) is ranked as the top university in London.
  - 4 June: It is announced that Imperial University is ranked second in the world in major university ranking.
  - 5 July: The 2024 General Election takes place, with Labour winning a landslide vote. Sir Keir Starmer becomes the new Prime Minister and moves into 10 Downing Street.
  - 31 July: Rioters clash with police during demonstrations in London and Hartlepool over the Southport attack.
  - July–September: The London Evening Standard newspaper transitions from daily to weekly publication under the title The London Standard.
  - 1 August: City, University of London merges with St George's, University of London. In 2025 the combined institution is named City St George's, University of London.
  - 14 August: Banksy's 9th and final work in his animal artwork series across London appears on the gates of London Zoo, which depicts a gorilla lifting the shutter to release a sea lion and birds.
  - 1 October: Brunel University of London joins the University of London.
  - 30 October: The first case of the Clade 1b Mpox strain is detected in London.
  - 5 November: The planned industrial action across the London Underground network, which was previously announced for 1–16 November 2024, is called off.
  - 14 November: 26 sites across London, including a Jacobean mansion and a concert venue in a Baroque church, are added to Historic England's at-risk register.
  - 28 November:
    - IKEA announces the forthcoming opening of 'Hus of FRAKTA' in TopShop's former flagship store on Oxford Street before its full opening in the Spring of 2025.
    - The London Overground is rebranded with new colours and the following names: Liberty, Lioness, Mildmay, Suffragette, Weaver, Windrush.
  - November: The Elvis Evolution, an immersive concert experience, will premiere in London using AI and holographic projection following the success of ABBA Voyage.
  - 27-29 December: London Paddington is closed to mainline trains due to engineering works in preparation for the opening of the Old Oak Common HS2 Interchange. Elizabeth line services are terminated at Ealing Broadway, and Great Western Railway services are diverted into London Euston. These works are projected to continue until the early 2030s.
  - 30 December: Jewellery worth £10,400,000 is stolen from a home in St John's Wood in one of Britain’s biggest burglaries.
  - London's mainline railway and TfL services continue to be affected during ASLEF and RMT strikes during the earlier part of the year. These are called off during the summer.
- 2025
  - 19 January: Local television channel London Live closes down and is replaced by Local TV Limited's London TV (closure announced 13 January).
  - 26 January: It is announced that fatal stabbings in London are at their lowest in years due to work with teens in hospital.
  - 27 January: Transport for London (TfL) launches its 25th anniversary celebrations.
  - 21 March: A Hayes substation fire causes a major power outage at Heathrow Airport, which is closed for the day.
  - 7 April: Silvertown Tunnel is opened to traffic by TfL.
  - The Thames Tideway Tunnel super-sewer is expected to open.
  - The London Underground 2024 Stock is expected to enter service on the Piccadilly Line, and possibly the Bakerloo and Central Lines as well.
  - A revamped Olympia reopens with a new music venue, theatres, hotels and bars.
  - 1 Undershaft could start construction around this time, with completion expected to be around 2029. If completed, it would become the 2nd tallest building in London after The Shard.
- 2026
  - 27 April: The Queen Elizabeth II Garden opens to the public within Regent's Park.
- 2026 – Projected
  - The Museum of London reopens as The London Museum in Smithfield.
  - Speculated: The House of Commons vacates the Palace of Westminster until 2034 while essential maintenance is carried out, with the new chamber being in Richmond House.
- 2028 - Speculated
  - The MSG Sphere, a concert venue based inside a giant globe, could open in Stratford. If approved, it would be an exact copy of the Sphere in Las Vegas. Plans were withdrawn in January 2024.
- Between 2029 and 2033 – Projected
  - Old Oak Common station will open as a connection between Great Western Railway (GWR), the Elizabeth line and HS2, with the latter of these being completed around this time.

== See also ==
- Timeline of London
- History of London

== Bibliography ==
See also lists of works about London by period: Tudor London, Stuart London, 18th century, 19th century, 1900–1939, 1960s

published in the 19th century

- Elmes, James (1831). Topographical Dictionary of London and Its Environs. London: Whittaker, Treacher and Arnot.
- Thomas Allen; Thomas Wright (1839). "Account of the Companies of the City of London, Alphabetically Arranged". History and Antiquities of London, Westminster, Southwark, and Parts Adjacent. Vol. 2. London. pp. 376–429. hdl:2027/hvd.hwh1uq.
- "London". Penny Cyclopaedia. Vol. 14. London: Charles Knight. 1839. pp. 109–129. hdl:2027/ucm.5319406728.
- Charles Knight, ed. (1844), "Metropolitan Boroughs", London, vol. 6, London: C. Knight & Co.
- Peter Cunningham (1850), "Chronology of London Occurrences", Handbook of London (2nd ed.), London: John Murray, OCLC 4773921
- J. Willoughby Rosse (1859). "London". Index of Dates ... Facts in the Chronology and History of the World. Bohn's reference library. London: H.G. Bohn. hdl:2027/hvd.32044098621048 – via HathiTrust.
- Timbs, John (1866), Club Life of London, London: J. Bentley, OL 7098926M
- George Henry Townsend (1867), "London", A Manual of Dates (2nd ed.), London: Frederick Warne & Co., pp. 587–590
- William Henry Overall, ed. (1870), "London", Dictionary of Chronology, London: William Tegg, OCLC 2613202
- Charles Dickens (1882), "Historical Events", Dickens's Dictionary of London, London: Macmillan & Co.
- John and Robert Maxwell (1885). "Memorable Dates". Concise Guide to London. London. circa 1882
- R. Price-Williams (1885), "Population of London, 1801–81", Journal of the Statistical Society, vol. 48, pp. 349–432, hdl:2027/uc1.b4148209
- Mrs. Basil Holmes (1896). "Burial-Grounds within the Metropolitan Area". London Burial Grounds. Macmillan.

published in the 20th century

- Henry Barton Baker (1904), "Chronological List of the London Theatres", History of the London Stage and its Famous Players (1576–1903), London: Routledge
- Chisholm, Hugh, ed. (1910). "Westminster" . Encyclopædia Britannica. Vol. 28 (11th ed.). Cambridge University Press. pp. 549–551.
- Robert Donald, ed. (1907). "London". Municipal Year Book of the United Kingdom for 1907. London: Edward Lloyd. pp. 5–47.
- Howarth, Osbert John Radcliffe; Ingram, Thomas Allan; Wheatley, Henry Benjamin (1910). "London" . In Chisholm, Hugh (ed.). Encyclopædia Britannica. Vol. 16 (11th ed.). Cambridge University Press. pp. 938–968, see pages 945 and 951. "IV. Population, Public Health, &c. & VII. Government"
- Francis Miltoun (1908). "Brief Chronology". Dickens' London. Boston: L.C. Page & Company.
- Benjamin Vincent (1910), "London", Haydn's Dictionary of Dates (25th ed.), London: Ward, Lock & Co., pp. 839–848
- Walter H. Godfrey (1911), "List of Buildings on ... Map 1: The City of London and Southwark", History of Architecture in London, London: B.T. Batsford
- Cook's Handbook to London. London: Thos. Cook & Son. 1921.
- George F.E. Rudé (1971). Hanoverian London, 1714–1808. History of London. University of California Press. ISBN 978-0-520-01778-8.
- Nicholson, Louise (1998). "London Chronology". London. Abbeville Press. ISBN 978-0-7112-1187-2.

published in the 21st century

- John Richardson (2000). The Annals of London: A Year-by-year Record of a Thousand Years of History. University of California Press. ISBN 978-0-520-22795-8.
- Leonard Schwarz (2000). "London, 1700–1840". In Peter Clark (ed.). Cambridge Urban History of Britain. Vol. 2. Cambridge University Press. p. 641+. ISBN 978-0-521-43141-5.
- Ackroyd, Peter (2001), "Chronology", London: the Biography, Nan A. Talese, ISBN 9780385497701
- Erika Diane Rappaport (2001). Shopping for Pleasure: Women in the Making of London's West End. Princeton University Press. ISBN 0-691-04476-7.
- A.N. Wilson (2004). "Chronology of London History". London: A History. Modern Library. p. 193+. ISBN 978-0-307-42665-9.
- Ben Weinreb; et al. (2008). The London Encyclopaedia (3rd ed.). Macmillan. ISBN 978-0-230-73878-2.
- Michelin; Lifestyle, Michelin Travel (2012). "20C to Today (timeline)". London. Michelin Green Guide. ISBN 978-2-06-718238-7.
- Jonathan Conlin (2013). Tales of Two Cities: Paris, London and the Birth of the Modern City. Counterpoint LLC. ISBN 978-1-61902-225-6.
- Marc Matera (2015). Black London: The Imperial Metropolis and Decolonization in the Twentieth Century. University of California Press. ISBN 978-0-520-95990-3.
