= Donnybrook =

Donnybrook may refer to:

== Places ==
=== Australia ===
- Donnybrook, Queensland
- Donnybrook, Western Australia
  - Shire of Donnybrook, a former local government area
- Donnybrook, Victoria
  - Donnybrook railway station

=== Canada ===
- Donnybrook, Ontario, a former village in southwest Ontario

=== Ireland ===
- Donnybrook, Dublin
  - site of the original Donnybrook Fair
  - Donnybrook Stadium, a rugby union stadium
  - Donnybrook Cemetery
- Donnybrook, Douglas, Cork

=== South Africa ===
- Donnybrook, KwaZulu-Natal

=== United Kingdom ===
- Donnybrook Quarter, a residential area in the Bow area of the East End of London

=== United States ===
- Donnybrook, North Dakota
- Donnybrook, Oregon

== Other uses ==
- Donnybrook (film), a 2018 American-French drama film
- Donnybrook!, a 1961 Broadway musical

== See also ==
- Donnybrook Fair (disambiguation)
- Donnybrook stone, a feldspathic and kaolinitic sandstone
- Donnybrook Writing Academy, a collective of writers etc. in 1920s, and former internet blog
- Donny Brook, a 1969 album by Don Patterson with Sonny Stitt
