= PDC (gang) =

Former street gang and record label

- Founded: 1990s
- Founding location: Brixton, South London, England
- Years active: 1990s
- Territory: Brixton (SW9)
- Ethnicity: Black British
- Criminal activities: Drug trafficking, robbery
- Allies: PIF (Paid In Full), CFR (Corleone Family Riderz), OC (Organised Crime) Nasty Squad, 031 (0-Tray 1 Bloods)
- Rivals: Peckham Boys

The PDC (Pray Days Change, Public Demand Cartel, or Poverty Driven Children, formerly Peel Dem Crew or Pussy Drugs Cash) was a street gang based in Brixton, London, England, mainly the Angell Town Estate. During the 1990s, they were the largest and most prominent gang in the SW9 postcode. Members were known to be involved in the drugs trade, robberies, shootings, stabbings and general violence. The gang associated with the colours red and purple.

Following Ja-Ja's release from prison, he encouraged members of the gang to do more positive things with their lives and reformed PDC as a music collective and label. They released an album, Pray Days Change, and several music videos.

A faction of the PDC meanwhile broke off and converted to Islam in search of an identity while still continuing to engage in crime. This group, known as the 'Muslim Boys', caused something of a stir in the media for their lurid mix of gangsterism and religion and were said to engage in forced conversions at gunpoint.

== History ==
The prominent gang in the area during the 1980s was called the 28s. Inspired by the 28s, local youths Elijah, now known as Jaja Soze, Nathan (Inch), Michael (Birdie) and Simon (Phat Si) all grew up around Angell Town Estate in Brixton, South London. Together they formed their own gang as a successor to the 28s called the Young 28s, although they had no actual affiliation with the 28s gang. The gang originally focused primarily on business robberies and drug dealing. In 1995, another local youth known as Tanna came up with the name "PDC", meaning "Peel Dem Crew" or "Pil Dem Crew". "Peel Dem" was Jamaican street slang for robbing or ripping people off. The PDC continued Brixtons longtime rivalry with neighbouring Peckham by committing robberies in the area, causing conflict with local gang Peckham Boys. The gang became known for "steaming", the act of rushing into banks, stores, or trains and taking money from the till, passengers, or anything they could grab.

The gang grew through the 1990s and began to control much of crack cocaine dealing in South London. The gang grew to cover not only Brixton, but Kennington and parts of Stockwell. The gang generated conflicts with local Jamaican-led gangs in the areas.

Jaja Soze, the boss of PDC, ironically referred to himself as the 'boss of bosses' as a nod to the mafia title. In 2002, the police began an undercover surveillance operation that would lead to the imprisonment of various PDC leaders and gang members, including Kojo (caught buying drugs) and his younger brothers Byron (also known as Ribz), who was sentenced to 21 months detention in YOI, and Errol (also known as Skippy), who was sentenced to custody. Three of the original founders of the gang, Nathan, Simon, and Jaja Soze, were also arrested for supply related and firearms offences and all were sentenced to over three years in jail.

=== Splintering of the gang ===
By the early 2000s, imprisonment of many PDC leaders led to the gang splintering. Various independent gangs emerged from this splintering, such as the Muslim Boys (as nicknamed by the police and press) and Y28s (not to be confused with Y28s that preceded PDC, which was a different group), the latter of which was formed by former members of the PDC Brats, a subset for younger members. The Y28s would later join up with Tiny OC to form GAS Gang.

The Muslim Boys were named as such not by the gang members, but the police and press alike. Police would encounter youth who would claim to be Muslim in order to gain preferential treatment (although some members had indeed converted to Islam). The gang themselves later adopted the name. Some members of the Muslim Boys began to present themselves as Islamists and claim links to Al Qaeda in order to gain street cred. This group caused a stir in the media for their mix of gangsterism and religion and were said to engage in forced conversions at gunpoint, although the substance to these claims of forced conversions and of their threat level has been called into question. Nonetheless, following the claims, the Mayor of London's senior advisor on policing, Lee Jaspar, described the Muslim Boys as a terrorist front "as tough to crack as the IRA".

On New Year's Eve in December 2004, PDC affiliate Solomon Martin (also known as Blacker) was shot dead in Thornton Heath. Members of PDC that were affiliated with Blacker would dissociate from PDC and form their own gang known as CFR (Certified Riderz or Corelone Family Riderz). Other former members of PDC would form PIF (Paid In Full), and Tanna, who came up with the name "PDC", went and formed the 031 Bloods.

=== Rebranding as legitimate business ===
During his imprisonment, Jaja Soze renounced gang life and, around 2005, rebranded the gang into a group called "Poverty Driven Children". In prison, he qualified in business studies. Following Jaja's release from prison, he encouraged members of the gang to do more positive things with their lives and started up a music label instead, called "PDC (Public Demand Cartel) Entertainments", led by Jaja and former gang members Najar Kerr (also known as Naja Soze), Byron Cole, Nathan Cross (Inch), Sykes, Errol Cole, Michael Deans (Birdie), and Simon Maitland (Phat Si). They released an album, Pray Days Change, and several music videos. PDC also formed a clothing line called "Public Demand Cartel", a barbershop called "Pristine Designer Cuts", and a youth engagement project called "Code 7".

In 2007, the Lambeth Council falsely claimed that PDC was the boroughs largest gang with 2,500 members. PDC Entertainment at the time had 2,500 fans on one of its MySpace pages. Jaja Soze repeatedly stated in interviews that the gang no longer existed.

In 2009, Danny Dyer covered the PDC in his documentary series Danny Dyer's Deadliest Men.

== Music ==
Members of PDC started making music in the mid-1990s, releasing popular mixtapes and music videos.

=== PDC rap group ===
During his imprisonment, Jaja Soze renounced gang life and, around 2005, rebranded the gang into a group called "Poverty Driven Children". In prison, he qualified in business studies. Following Jaja's release from prison, he encouraged members of the gang to do more positive things with their lives and started up a music label instead, called "PDC (Public Demand Cartel) Entertainments", led by Jaja and former gang members Najar Kerr (also known as Naja Soze), Byron Cole, Nathan Cross (Inch), Sykes, Errol Cole, Michael Deans (Birdie), and Simon Maitland (Phat Si). They released an album, Pray Days Change, and several music videos. PDC also formed a clothing line called "Public Demand Cartel", a barbershop called "Pristine Designer Cuts", and a youth engagement project called "Code 7".

Ty Nizzy, a member of the rap group, is the father of Loski, a member of the Harlem Spartans.
