= Soze (surname) =

Soze or Söze is a surname. Notable people with the surname include:

- Jaja Soze, pseudonym of British rapper Elijah Kerr (born 1980)
- Keyser Söze, a fictional character and the main antagonist in the 1995 film The Usual Suspects
