= GAS Gang =

British street gang from Brixton, South London

- Founded: Late 2000s
- Founding location: Angell Town, Brixton, South London, England
- Territory: Brixton Road up to Stockwell Park, parts of Myatts Field, Angell Town Estate, Loughborough Junction
- Ethnicity: Black British
- Criminal activities: Drug trafficking, murder, theft, money laundering
- Allies: Murder Zone (MZ), Organised Crime (OC), Original Brooklyn Youths (OBY) / Brooklyn Family Riders (BFR), Roadside G's
- Rivals: ABM (All Bout Money), DSN (Don't Say Nuttin), GMG, PYG (Peckham Young Guns), TN1 (Trust No-One)

GAS Gang, also known more simply as GG or GAS, was a British street gang based in Brixton, South London that formed sometime in the late 2000s. The name carries various different meanings, such as Guns And Shanks, Gangsters Always Shoot, Grip And Shoot, and Grind And Stack. By 2012, they were considered one of the most dangerous gangs in South London, with at least 3 murders being committed by alleged gang members since 2010. The local council and police in 2012 believed the gang was responsible for three quarters of violent incidents involving young people in Brixton, with up to eight suspect members of the gang going to jail for attempted murder or murder.

A founder (now former member) of the gang claimed they originally had over 100 members when they first formed. GAS Gang was reported to have around 50 members in 2012. In 2015, a local police officer estimated they once had hundreds of members, but declined in the early 2010s due to leaders of the gang going to jail. In 2012, the oldest known member was 18 years old.

GAS had affiliations with some local gangs such as Murder Zone (MZ), Organised Crime (OC), Original Brooklyn Youths (OBY) / Brooklyn Family Riders (BFR), and Roadside G's. The gang was known for its violent conflicts with neighbouring gangs, and had rivalries with ABM (All Bout Money) based in Stockwell, Tulse Hill Gang (also known as TN1, or Trust No-One) based in Tulse Hill, PYG (Peckham Young Guns) and GMG based in Peckham. GAS also had conflict with Croydon-based gang DSN (Don't Say Nuttin).

== History ==
=== Early history ===
Brixton has had a multi-generational problem with gangs, with each generation taking on their own identity and name. Angell Town Estate, where GAS was formed, has long had problems with gang violence and poverty, previously being home to the gang PDC. In a 2012 Lambeth government report, Angell Town Estate was characterized as "severely deprived in income, employment, heath and crime".

By the early 2000s, PDC, which was the dominant gang in the area at the time, began to fragment due to many of its leaders being imprisoned. Various different groups emerged from this fragmentation, such as the Muslim Boys and Y28s (not to be confused with Y28s that preceded PDC). A member of the PDC Brats (a subset of PDC for the younger members) called Barfah Joof was involved in founding the new Y28s. The Y28s began to form friendships with neighbouring gangs in the area, such as Tiny OC based in Myatts Field, and Murder Zone based in Somerleyton Estate. Y28s and Tiny OC had formed a rivalry with Peckham-based gangs, and at one point gang members were caught unarmed by Peckham gang members, leading to one of their members being stabbed. This convinced members of Y28s and Tiny OC that they needed to unite together as one, leading to GAS Gang being created. Barfah would later leave the gang after being guided by his probation officer. By 2007, the gang began to gain notability in the estate, although it may have formed earlier.

GAS Gang initially associated with the colours green (inherited from OC) and purple (inherited from Y28s), although colour associations would fade out by the 2010s. GAS also inherited OC's rivalries with Peckham-based PYG.

In 2009, a set of CCTV videos were released showing large groups of GAS Gang and PYG members riding into each other's territories. GAS also gained its first attention in the media in 2009, when a 13-year-old boy was stabbed outside a Camberwell fast-food shop in an altercation believed to be a part of the GAS Gang and PYG rivalry.

=== 2010s ===
GAS Gang's prolific activity led to parts of Brixton becoming a no-go area. By 2012, they were considered one of the most dangerous gangs in South London, with at least three murders by alleged gang members since 2010. The local council and police in 2012 believed the gang was responsible for three quarters of violent incidents involving young people in Brixton, with up to eight suspect members of the gang going to jail for attempted murder or murder.

==== Murder of Sylvester Akapalara ====
In 2010 Sylvester Akapalara was shot dead by a group of youths in a tower block called Heron House, on Pelican Estate in Peckham, South London. It was initially reported that the youths who committed the murder were members of GAS Gang, but it was later found that they were members of Peckham-based gang GMG. The youths had been seen in anti-GMG videos. 19-year old David Nyamupfukudza (also known as Tiny Nutty) was sentenced to a minimum of 26 years in jail for the murder. 20-year old Sodiq Adeojo (also known as Jungle) was sentenced to 30 years for his involvement in the murder.

==== Stabbing of a youth ====
A younger member of TN1 (Trust No-One), a rival gang, was stabbed outside of Brixton police station by a GAS Gang member. Two days later, older TN1 members entered a chicken shop in GAS Gang territory. In response, around 25 GAS Gang members quickly surrounded the chicken shop, prompting police to intervene before anything could happen. Members from PYG in Peckham also committed similar incursions into GAS Gang territory, prompting GAS members to do the same in return. One such incident in 2010 involved a PYG member pulling up to a group of GAS Gang members and randomly unloading several rounds into the crowd.

==== 2010 murder of Zac Olumegbon ====
In 2011, five prominent members of GAS, Ricardo Giddings (aka Maggy), Helder Demorais (aka Mad H), Jamal Moore (aka JJ, Younger Sneaky, or J-Kid), Shaquille Haughton (Shaq or SH) and Kyle Kinghorn (aka Clickz), were sentenced to a total of 76 years in prison for the murder of rival gang member, fifteen-year-old Zac Olumegbon (also known as Lil Zac) the year prior. This was the start of GAS Gang's conflict with Stockwell-based gang, ABM (All Bout Money). Zac was alleged to be a member of TN1 (Trust No-One), which had an allegiance with ABM.

==== 2011 murder of Azezur Khan ====
In November 2011, Azezur 'Ronnie' Khan was shot dead by an unidentified gunman while attending a funeral for a friend, a member of GAS Gang, that had died in a car crash. Police were warned of the possibility of violence at the funeral, but did not send any officers. The burial for Azezur's friend was being held in Southwark, territory containing rival gangs to GAS. The police were widely criticised for their inaction in ensuring no violence occurred.

==== 2012 shooting of Thusha Kamaleswaran ====
In 2012, 5-year old Thusha Kamaleswaran was paralyzed after an attack by alleged members of GAS Gang. Three alleged members of GAS Gang, Nathaniel Grant, Kazeem Kolawole and Anthony McCalla (also known as Mad Antz), were jailed for life as a result. McCalla however denied he was in GAS Gang, and instead stated he was a member of Tiny OC. The trio were actually attempting to shoot a rival gang member who had run into a store where Thusha, an innocent bystander, was located. They shot indiscriminately into the store and inadvertently hit Thusha in her chest, leaving her paralyzed from the waist down.

==== Murder of Temidayo Ogunneye ====
Two months after the shooting of Thusa, Temidayo Ogunneye was robbed by members of GAS Gang in Myatts Field. When he later returned to retrieve his phone, he was stabbed by a member of GAS. 16-year old Nathan McLeod was sentenced to a minimum of 14 years for the murder.

==== 2012 crack arrests ====
In March 2012, a group of drug dealers associated with GAS were arrested. One of the dealers was known to sell crack while holding his baby.

==== 2014 county lines arrests ====
On 8 April 2014, over 700 police officers were involved in raids on the homes of gang members across London and the UK. Nine raids were conducted in and around Angell Town Estate, with GAS Gang being specifically targeted. It was reported GAS had expanded their drug dealing operations across the UK with contacts in Edinburgh, Essex, Bedfordshire, Reading and Bracknell. The gang was also linked to money laundering, gun crime, stabbings, and attacks on neighbouring rivals. In previous raids, 88 'foot soldiers' involved in peddling drugs for the gang had been arrested. Detective Chief Inspector Tim Champion stated:

We are targeting this gang because it is one of the most dangerous in London whose members are involved in knife and gun crime. We have disrupted their activity and the feedback we are getting is that this has suppressed violence… We have seen a 6.5 per cent reduction in knife crime among the under-25s but this is an ongoing process.

=== Fragmentation ===
Police reported that Brixton gangs in 2011/2012 were coming together in order to fight back against incursions from Peckham-based gang members, leading to a sort of confederation amongst Brixton gangs while still retaining the GAS Gang label. This led to close affiliations between GAS and Murder Zone (MZ), a gang based in Somerleyton Estate. Another gang, Loughborough Bois based in Loughborough Junction, decided to merge with GAS Gang.

However, GAS Gang also began to fragment due to leaders of the gang being jailed, leaving a leadership vacuum in their place. Independent factions developed, with some younger members of GAS Gang now referring to themselves as GAS Rockblock 150 (or Rockblock 150, and later simply 150). whereas some GAS Gang members from Somerleyton Estate now referring to themselves as GAS Siru or Siru. The fragmenting also led to infighting between the two new factions. Another split-off occurred around Brixton Road, with a group of GAS Gang youngers forming a new group called Villa Road. 150 would develop a rivalry with Brixton Hill-based group 67.

=== Music ===
Members of the gang were prominent in the road rap music scene. One prominent member was Sneakbo, who would later leave gang life behind after being arrested in 2011 when police suspected he may have been connected to a murder. The case was dropped, and he decided to take music seriously.

Another member, known as J-Kid, JJ, or Younger Sneaky, was also a prominent rapper in the gang. He was jailed for a minimum of 14 years for the murder of Zac Olumegbon in 2010.

150, a group that splintered off from GAS, became known in the UK drill scene where they have been credited as pioneers.
