= Akingbade =

West African surname

- Gender: Male
- Language: Yoruba

Origin
- Origin: Nigerian
- Region of origin: South -West Nigeria

Akingbade // is a West African surname, which is held by a number of individuals all over the world.

== History ==
The definition of the name Akingbade is “strong/brave one who wears the crown”. Its origin is from the West African language of Yoruba.

A more detailed origin of the surname is situated in the town of Epe (now in Lagos, Nigeria). In ancient times (before the colonization by the British Empire) each town had its own monarchy. Yoruba surnames tell a history of the ancestors. The surname Akingbade comes from the royal family in Epe.

== People ==
People with the surname Akingbade include:

- Ayo Akingbade, artist
- Dokun Akingbade, Nigerian basketball player
- Wale Akingbade, Author and music composer
