= Ayo Akingbade =

British author and film director (born 1994)

Ayo Akingbade (born 1994) is an artist, writer and film director. She has directed nineteen short films. Her short films explore the mundanity of urban life in full swing in London's inner-city boroughs and industrial life in her family's hometown in Nigeria.

== Biography ==
Akingbade was born in 1994 in London to Nigerian parents and spent her upbringing in the East London borough of Hackney, which is featured as an onsite location in some of her films including In Ur Eye (2015), Tower XYZ (2016) and Jitterbug (2022).

She earned a graduate degree in film at the London College of Communication and subsequently attended the Royal Academy Schools as a student from 2018 to 2021 and is featured on the RA collection website.

== Career ==
Akingbade graduated with the intent to build a career in the film industry and has spoken about her experiences not being taken seriously as a Black woman in the white-dominated field.

Akingbade went on to shoot and release her first short film, In Ur Eye in 2015, which she subsequently entered into the Fourwalls Short Film Project, designed to encourage London-based filmmakers to make films about the reality of the city's housing crisis.

She cites Spike Lee, Ousmane Sembene, Souleymane Cisse, Safi Faye and Steve McQueen as her first major film inspirations. In an interview with the British Film Directory, Akingbade suggests that her vision for her own films resonates with British films such as High Hopes (1988) by Mike Leigh and Burning An Illusion (1981) by Menelik Shabazz.

Akingbade has been supported on three occasions in her filmmaking career by the British Council to attend the Oberhausen Short Film Festival for her film Tower XYZ and to travel to Russia and New York City.

=== Upcoming projects ===
Following her solo exhibition in 2022 with the same title, Akingbade released her first publication, Show Me the World Mister, in October 2023. The book has a specific focus on two of Akingbade's cinematic works, The Fist and Faluyi, illustrating the intrinsic relationship between industrialisation and the family.

== Filmography ==
Her trilogy of short films, No News Today (2019) provides a commentary on social housing and the response of residents to issues such as redevelopment and gentrification. This includes the film Tower XYZ (2016), which is shot primarily in West and East London on housing estates. Street 66 (2018) is compiled from archival footage and interviews about the 1970s regeneration of the Angell Town estate in Brixton, South London. This includes a portrait of the late housing activist, Dora Boatemah. The trilogy is completed with Dear Babylon (2019), a fictional dystopia that utilises archival footage of street protests.

=== Artistic style ===
As Akingbade herself has acknowledged, she "addresses notions of urbanism, power and stance." She places emphasis on the importance of the image to convey broader social and political history and realities.

The form of Akingbade's work varies from narrative shorts, to experimental essays and the documentary. As much a visual media artist as a filmmaker, her form ties into her subject matter, which centres around conveying an emotional and socio-political attachment to a physical space. Her earlier films have served as considerate, truthful portraits of inner-city estates in London. Her most recent works, Faluyi (2022) and The Fist (2022) have tackled the mystical and industrial world of Nigeria.

Short Films
Year	Title	Director	Writer	Producer	Editor
2015	In Ur Eye	Yes	Yes	Yes	Yes
2016	Tower XYZ	Yes	Yes	Yes	Yes
2017	Fallou	No	No	Yes	No
2018	Street 66	Yes	No	Yes	No
	A is for Artist	Yes	Yes	Yes	Yes
2019	Dear Babylon	Yes	Yes	Yes	No
	So They Say	Yes	No	Yes	No
	Claudette's Star	Yes	No	Yes	No
2020	Hella Trees	Yes	Yes	Yes	No
	Akimbo Stylee	Yes	Yes	No	No
	Deadphant	Yes	No	Yes	Yes
2021	Fire in My Belly	Yes	Yes	Yes	No
	Sukiyaki	Yes	No	Yes	Yes
	Red Soleil	Yes	No	Yes	No
2022	Jitterbug	Yes	Yes	Yes	No
	Faluyi	Yes	Yes	Yes	No
	The Fist	Yes	N/A	N/A	N/A

== Awards and nominations ==
Akingbade has received recognition and praise for her short films and visual media artwork on an international stage with nominations from international film award festivals. This includes winning the 2017 International Competition 'Special Mention' award at the Oberhausen International Short Film Festival for her film Tower XYZ (2016) and another 'Special Mention' award for 2020 UK Short Film Award at the Open City Documentary Festival for her film So They Say (2019).

Alongside this, Akingbade was shortlisted for the 2023 Film London Jarman Award.

Awards and Nominations
Year	Association	Category	Work	Result
2017	Oberhausen International Short Film Festival	International Competition	Tower XYZ	Won
2020	Uppsala International Short Film Festival	International Competition	Dear Babylon	Nominated
	Glasgow Short Film Festival	Best Short	Dear Babylon	Nominated
	Open City Documentary Festival	UK Short Film Award	So They Say	Won
	Open City Documentary Festival	Open City Award	So They Say	Nominated
2021	Doclisboa International Film Festival	Best Green Years Film Award	Red Soleil	Nominated
