= Jaja Soze =

British rapper

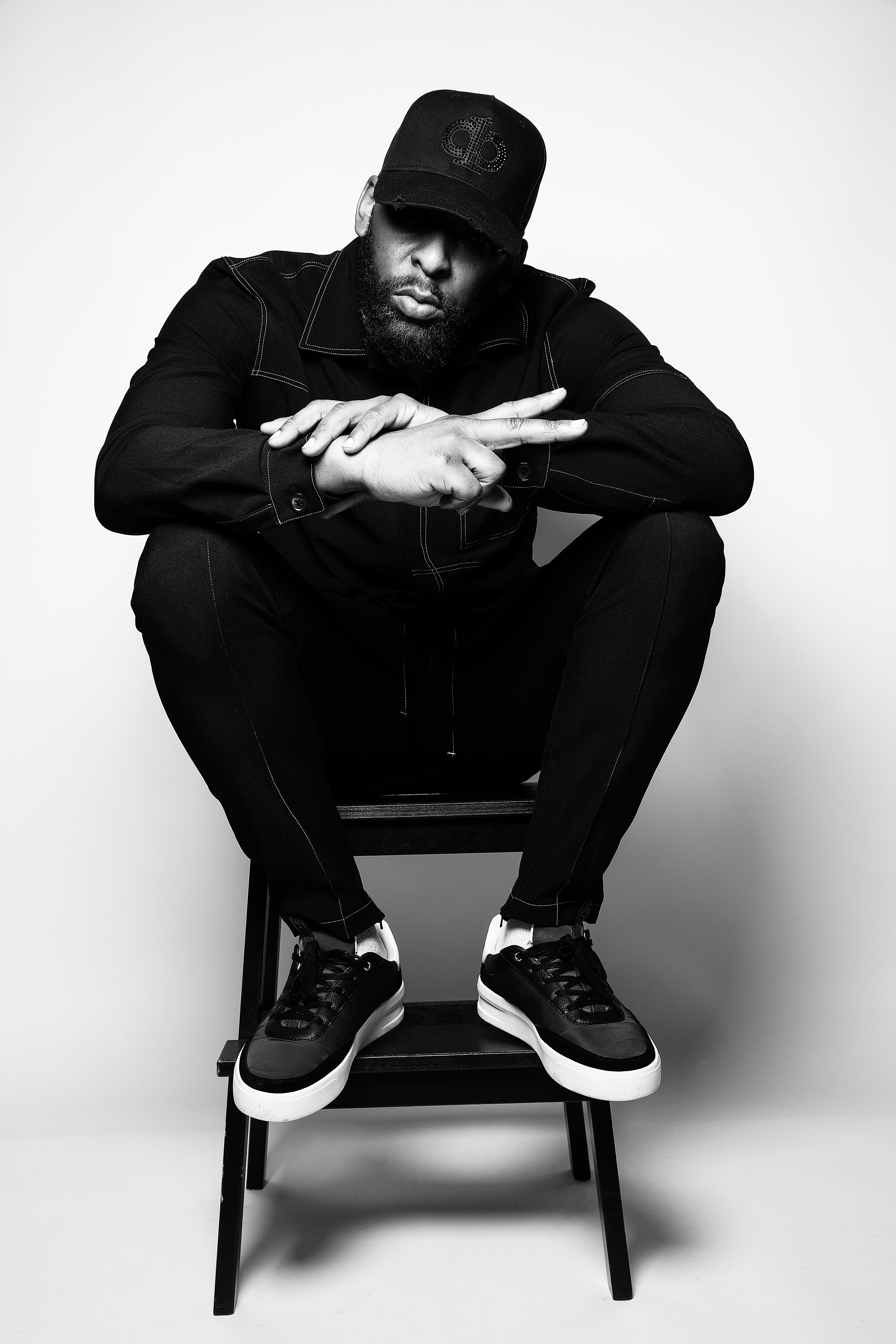
- Jaja Soze at his album cover photoshoot

Background information
- Born: Elijah Kerr; 16 February 1980 (age 46); Birmingham, England
- Origin: Brixton, South London, England
- Genres: British hip hop; road rap
- Occupation: Rapper
- Years active: 1998–present
- Labels: Independent (2005–present)
- Formerly of: PDC
- Website: www.jajasoze.com

Elijah Kerr (born 16 February 1980), known professionally as Jaja Soze, is a British rapper. Well known for his key role as one of the founders of the biggest U.K street movement and music group PDC, Jaja released his debut studio album Streetboy in 2008, along with his second album, I Love Music in 2009, followed by his Illegal Download album in 2010, all of which were distributed independently. His fourth studio album, The Last Message was released in 2012 and went to No. 19 in the iTunes Hiphop chart.

His influence in and around British street culture as a key figure and rap legend has seen him appear on many of the popular media and music platforms, such as with Tim Westwood, talking about his experiences and influencing the up-and-coming generations.

== Early life ==
Jaja Soze was born Elijah Kerr on 16 February 1980 in Birmingham, England, to parents from Jamaica. He is the oldest of five siblings and grew up in Handsworth, Birmingham. Kerr attended Westminster Primary School where he grew up, looking up to the local sound systems of the '80s whilst also being inspired by a popular local gang called the "Incheyes" who later separated into the Johnsons and Burger Bar gangs. Because of domestic disputes in his family, Kerr moved to Brixton, on the Angell Town Estate in South London in the early '90s, where he then became heavily involved in crime, and convicted in 1996 at the age of just 15, for a bank robbery. He would then later be convicted and jailed at age 22, for drug-dealing.

Soze grew up heavily influenced by gang culture, especially that of a well known early '90s gang that he had grown up seeing in Brixton, called the 28s. Soze then grew to be a part of a well known London gang known as the Peel Dem Crew, (Note: "Peel dem" is Jamaican for "rob for them." J.A. Densley (February 2012). "The organisation of London's street gangs". Global Crime. 13 (1): 42–64.) which he later re-founded and transformed into PDC Rap Group, also known as Poverty Driven Children, as told in a biography, Street Boys, written by Soze and Tim Pritchard and published by HarperCollins.

== Career ==
Soze began creating music at the age of 12 years old (1992), heavily influenced by his upbringing of Rastafarian music with a mix of early American '90s hip hop like that of Public Enemy and UK London Posse which was rumoured to have sparked his interest in starting his own street type movement. Him and his friends would later go on to set up PDC rap group and create a massive platform that would inspire young disadvantaged youth, to be able to express their opinions and struggles of the UK street culture, via music.

Soze's music today is seen as a controversial message of revolution and street culture, with a deep message some will consider as "Street Activism" or music with a humanitarian type feel. Soze has won awards such as outstanding work recognition by Starlight music group, and also outstanding achievement at the Official Mixtape Awards.

== Selected publications ==
- The Power Of Love My Personal Notes. 2020. ISBN 9781715354909.

== Discography ==
- PDC First Cassette (mixtape) (1999)
- PDC Pray Days Change (album) (2004)
- Boss of the Bosses (mixtape) (2005)
- I'm Not a Rapper I'm a Revolutionary Mixtape
- Street Boy album and book (2008)
- I Love Music (2009)
- Illegal Download (2010)
- The Last Message (2012)
- Power (2014)
- The Creative Struggle (2014)
- Frequency (2016)
- Power of Love Audiobook (2021)
