= Donnybrook Writing Academy =

- Website type: Music and the arts webzine
- Headquarters: Denver, Colorado, United States
- Owner: Erin Barnes
- Creator: Erin Barnes
- Website: www.godonnybrook.com
- Registration: No
- Launched: August 2007
- Current status: Inactive

The Donnybrook Writing Academy was a collective of writers, musicians, and journalists writing under preposterous pen names under the guise that they're rich, notorious, and belligerent members of an upper class circa the 1920s. Formerly called Elitist Hipster Snob, the collective and subsequent Internet publication was founded under a new name in August 2007 and redesigned in March 2008. Beyond publishing an Internet publication, www.GoDonnybrook.com, the group threw decadent parties and was known for their tennis and Ivy League-inspired photo shoots.

== Description ==
There were roughly 20 writers, photographers, and artists in the collective, including integral members Danny and Nina of the Internet art project in which over 1 million people voted on what city the couple might move based on their interests. Other founding members include Cliffton Thompson (a.k.a. Guido Sarducci IV), Annie Cohen (a.k.a. Ivyy Goldberg, esq.), Nathan Warren (a.k.a. Colonel Hector Bravado, Christopher Gilmore (a.k.a. Fritz Godard), Corey Spangler (a.k.a. Hiram O'Cicero McKnoxt), and Patrick Kelly (a.k.a. Benjamin "Benny" St. Maur). In 2011 Vanessa Berben (a.k.a. Alistair Blake Arabella) joined the team and would later become Managing Editor. Erin Barnes (a.k.a. Angora Holly Polo) is founder and Editor-in-Chief.

== Features ==
The Donnybrook Writing Academy featured a variety of previews, reviews, podcasts, and interviews on the categories of music, film, photography, politics, video games, sex, and society. "On the Record" was a daily-updated record review column; "Soundcheck" was a local concert calendar and podcast; "Ask Alistair" was a snob's approach to the classic advice column; and the "Snobcast" was a podcast created by elitists. Other columns included "Bartender Blogs," "A Night Out With," "the Problem of Leisure," "Thematically Speaking," and "Handjob and a Reuben."

== Content and Style ==
Donnybrook's mission, to create "a society for cultural advancement," also drew heavily on indie and local Denver music scenes for content and inspiration. Stylistically, the site was a satire of classic writings that describe upper-crust society - from Fitzgerald to Jane Austen to the French salon culture - and since it was made up of somewhat young and destitute artists, writers, and musicians, it could be considered an ironic comment on the socioeconomic status of artists in contemporary American society. In that vein, the group was known for throwing such parties as "The Fundraiser for the Rich" to "replace Donnybrook's pool filter." in venues that are notoriously divey, such as the Larimer Lounge. Donnybrook paradoxically embraced and poked fun at elitism, as a phenomenon that is relevant in today's culture - where too much access to art, music, and the means to create it has created a backlash of cultural policing.
