= Donnybrook Fair (disambiguation) =

Donnybrook Fair was an annual fair that used to be held in Donnybrook, Dublin, and a slang term for a brawl or riot.

Donnybrook Fair may also refer to:

- An annual fair held in Walsh, Ontario, named after the Dublin fair
- Donnybrook Fair, a painting by William Sadler (painter), c. 1839
- Donnybrook Fair, a painting by Erskine Nicol, 1856
- "At the Donnybrook Fair", musical composition by John Prindle Scott, 1916
- "The Humours of Donnybrook Fair", 1830–1850, at least three songs about Dublin
- A chain of grocery/delicatessen stores in Ireland owned by the Musgrave Group

== See also ==
- Donnybrook, Dublin
