= Ghetto Boys =

British street gang based in Lewisham, New Cross and Deptford

- Founding location: New Cross, South London, England
- Years active: 1980s–present
- Territory: New Cross, Deptford, Lewisham – SE8 and SE14 in South London
- Ethnicity: Mostly Black British and other minorities
- Membership: 500+
- Activities: Drug trafficking, murder, assault, robbery
- Allies: Brockley Mandem, Tottenham Mandem, Young Brockley Mandem (YBM)
- Rivals: Catford Wildcats (Anti Shower), Peckham Boys, Woolwich Boys, Cherry Boys

The Ghetto Boys is a street gang based in New Cross, Lewisham and Deptford, South London.

The gang was formed on the Woodpecker/Milton Court Estate and its members are primarily of Black British origin. Most of the members are from the London Borough of Lewisham and some are thought to be as young as 12. Some members of the gang are known to carry firearms such as MAC-10 machine pistols. The gang was associated with the colour blue, due to the local usage of blue by the Lewisham city council. The gang had a notably violent conflict with the Peckham Boys during the 2000s, but by the mid-late 2000s the Ghetto Boys were in-decline and would end up splintering. Younger members of the gang formed "Shower" and later became associated with the Tottenham Mandem, collectively calling themselves "Shower Syndicate". It is alleged the group had links with the Jamaican gang Shower Posse.

In the mid-2010s, an offshoot group from the Ghetto Boys, known as 814, began to gain prominence in the UK drill scene.

== History ==
=== Early history ===
The Ghetto Boys have origins since the 1970s where they were founded in Woodpecker Estate (nicknamed "Ghetto Estate") in Lewisham, South London. The gang eventually spread out into neighbouring boroughs, and relied on recruitment of members through local schools. It was during this period that the rivalry between the Peckham Boys and Ghetto Boys would begin. The conflict drew widespread news coverage in 2006. It was reported in 2007 that Peckham Boys and the Ghetto Boys had been in conflict for about 20 years, with the conflict being passed down to each new generation of the gangs. During the 1970s, the African communities in Peckham and Caribbean communities in Deptford had rivalries and conflict, including during local football matches, which would often result in violence. Members of the Ghetto Boys would also travel to Peckham to commit robberies in order to avoid robbing their own community.

By the 1990s, the gang began to decline, with many of the older members of the gang going to prison, and many of the younger members being in conflict with each other. During this period, Ghetto Boys members in Catford split off from the gang to form their own gang called the Catford Wildcatz (CWC, later known as Anti Shower).

The Ghetto Boys were known to have many leaders since the 1980s. In the late 90s, a leader of Nigerian descent emerged, who went by the name of Andrew Wanogho, known by the street name "Sparks". Wanogho was killed in 2006 when he was shot in Brockley, South London.

The Ghetto Boys, similar to other gangs in the area, had crews for younger members of the gang: Younger Ghetto Boys (YGB) and Younger Younger Ghetto Boys (YYGB). Younger members often named themselves after older members, while also using the prefix "younger" or "young", while even younger members used the prefixes "tiny" or "baby" before their street names, such as Young Kraver. As the Ghetto Boys began to spread, they also formed regional subsets such as the Deptford Ghetto Boys, New Cross Ghetto Boys, and Lewisham Ghetto Boys.

=== 2000s: peak conflict with the Peckham Boys ===
In October 2004, the Peckham Boys and Ghetto Boys had an infamous shootout outside the Urban Music Awards, held in the Barbican Centre, London. During the shootout at least 18 shots were exchanged. One stray shot hit an innocent bystander, Helen Kelly. The underwire of her bra deflected the bullet, preventing fatal injury. Linton Ambursley from Lewisham, a Ghetto Boys member, was jailed for 12 years after admitting wounding with intent.

2006 saw a lot of violence between the Ghetto Boys and their rivals the Peckham Boys. In September, the Ghetto Boys performed two drive-by shootings in Peckham. Two days later, two teenagers were shot in Brixton in what was alleged to be retaliation. Soon after that, members of the Peckham Boys went into New Cross, at the time territory of the Ghetto Boys. Members of the two groups had an argument at a party, accusing each-other of disrespecting their respective gangs. One man was hit with a bottle in the incident.

Two days later, 40 members of the Peckham Boys rode into New Cross on bikes, armed with knives and a gas-gun. Jason Gayle-Brent, a former Ghetto Boy member himself and a relative of Ghetto Boys members Kraver, Young Kraver, and Smiler, was at the time sitting with a friend and relative. Jason had turned away from gangs and gang violence after being stabbed when he was younger. About 30 Peckham Boy members appeared down the street riding Mountain Bikes and began to shoot at Jason and his two acquaintances. A fight followed, and Jason was stabbed to death. It is thought Jason was mistaken for a member of the Ghetto Boys. As of 2010 the murder remained unsolved, as did 5 other recent murders on the Woodpecker Estate. That same night, a man was chased in Deptford by approximately 30-40 youths before being stabbed, but survived.

Following the death of Jason, a group of teens appeared outside the Community Action Centre in Deptford. A gun was fired, and a man on a moped was chased away. He crashed, and was eventually caught up by youths who stabbed him. The following evening, a shootout had occurred in Peckham. Three men pulled up to a basketball court in Peckham and were reported to have shouted "Peckham Boys are pussies", before pointing a gun through the railings and firing. No one was injured. Police later arrested a man and 17-year old girl, and seized a handgun, a Mac 10 submachine gun, and drugs.

Following the violence, local schools Peckham Academy and Harris Girls' Academy Schools were closed after being advised by the police more was to follow. Police had warned the schools that members of the Ghetto Boys were planning revenge for the death of Jason, and were going to ambush their rivals once they had left school. 700 pupils were sent home early in total, and police stood guard.

In October 2008, during an exchange of shots between a member of the Ghetto Boys and a Peckham Boys member, Polish care worker Magda Pniewska was hit by a stray bullet and died. The shootout occurred in New Cross. In the same year, the police arrested numerous key players and leaders of the Ghetto Boys, along with other gangs in London.

By 2007/8, after decades of conflict, the Peckham Boys and Ghetto Boys had agreed to a ceasefire and alliance. A witness to a murder in 2007 had reported that Peckham and the Wooly Road Youngers had allied with New Cross and Deptford, areas the Ghetto Boys controlled, which signaled an end to the conflict. However, they also reported elders in the gang found such an alliance disrespectful, and as a result thought it was unlikely to last.

=== Mid-late 2000s: Splintering and defragmentation ===
In 2006, it was reported that the gang had begun to weaken due to the prevalence of drug addiction, and the imprisonment or death of leaders. The gang had also begun to splinter and fragment into subsets, which would later become independent gangs. One of the new subsets that splintered off from the Ghetto Boys is called Shower (or Showah), formerly known as the Younger Ghetto Boys. Other splinter groups included the Pepys Gang Bangers and D-Block (Deptford). The subsets New Cross Ghetto Boys and Deptford Ghetto Boys also began to disassociate with the gang, and infighting between the various groups heightened. A leader of the Ghetto Boys, Andrew Wanogho was killed in 2006 when he was shot in Brockley, south-east London. His death is one of the reasons the fragmentation began. Black Mafia (BM) was one of the gangs that superseded the now weakened and fragmented Ghetto Boys, emerging in the mid-2000s in Lewisham.

=== Mid-2010s: 814 ===
In the mid-2010s, it was reported a new group known as 814 was an offshoot from the Ghetto Boys. The group was reported to be in conflict with Splash Gang (SG), a Grove Park based gang. 814 had risen to prominence in the UK drill scene under the name PHSB.

Showkey and MDot were both members of 814 and prominent artists in the scene. In separate incidents, they were both murdered. MDot was murdered in April 2016 at the age of 17, from stab wounds. Showkey was also stabbed to death in August 2016, at the age of 16.

In 2019, a fictional story based on the conflict between the Peckham Boys and Ghetto Boys was depicted in the film Blue Story.

In 2021, Joshua Erorh, also known as Lil MDot and a member of 814, was sentenced to 14 years in prison for stabbing someone in the chest.
