= Dora Boatemah =

Theodora "Dora" Boatemah MBE (July 22, 1957 – January 23, 2001) was a British Ghanaian community leader and activist based in South London. She founded the Angell Town Community Project in 1983 and was responsible for the regeneration of Angell Town Estate in Brixton, which commenced in 2001.

== Biography ==
Boatemah was born in 1957 in Kumasi, where her mother worked for Ghanaian leader Kwame Nkrumah. In 1959, Boatemah was sent to an English boarding school. Her mother joined her in 1967, after Nkrumah was deposed, but returned to Ghana in 1973. Boatemah remained in London.

As a young adult, Boatemah experienced homelessness. In 1977, she, her partner, Earl, and their young son moved to the Angell Town Estate in Brixton, South London. The estate was in disrepair, with poor living conditions. Boatemah established the Angell Town Community Project to campaign for community-controlled redevelopment. She sought the assistance of local and national politicians to improve the estate's conditions. She also campaigned for and won residents' right to vote on the estate's transfer from council ownership to housing action trusts.

Boatemah died in 2001 of a heart attack. She was 43 years old.

== Legacy ==
A documentary film by artist Ayo Akingbade chronicles Boatemah's life and influence on the regeneration of Angell Town Estate in Brixton, South London.

=== Awards and honours ===
- 1994 — Boatemah was awarded an MBE for services to the community in Brixton.
- 1996 — Boatemah was awarded an honorary doctorate from Oxford Brookes University.
- 2006 — Opening of Dora Boatemah Memorial Garden, based in Angell Town Estate.
