= Donnybrook Quarter =

Residential area in East London

Coordinates: 51.5362°N 0.0285°W

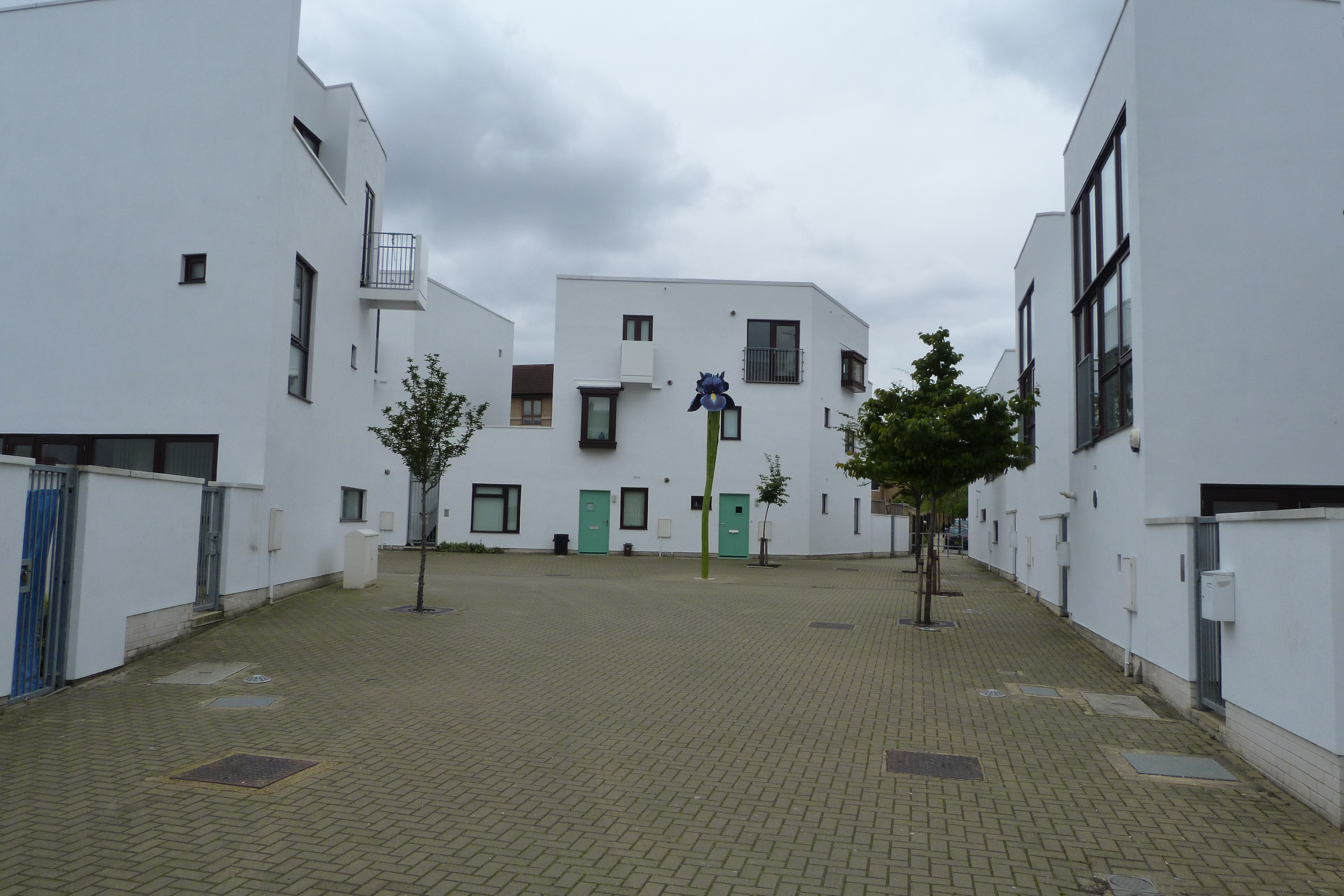
Donnybrook Quarter

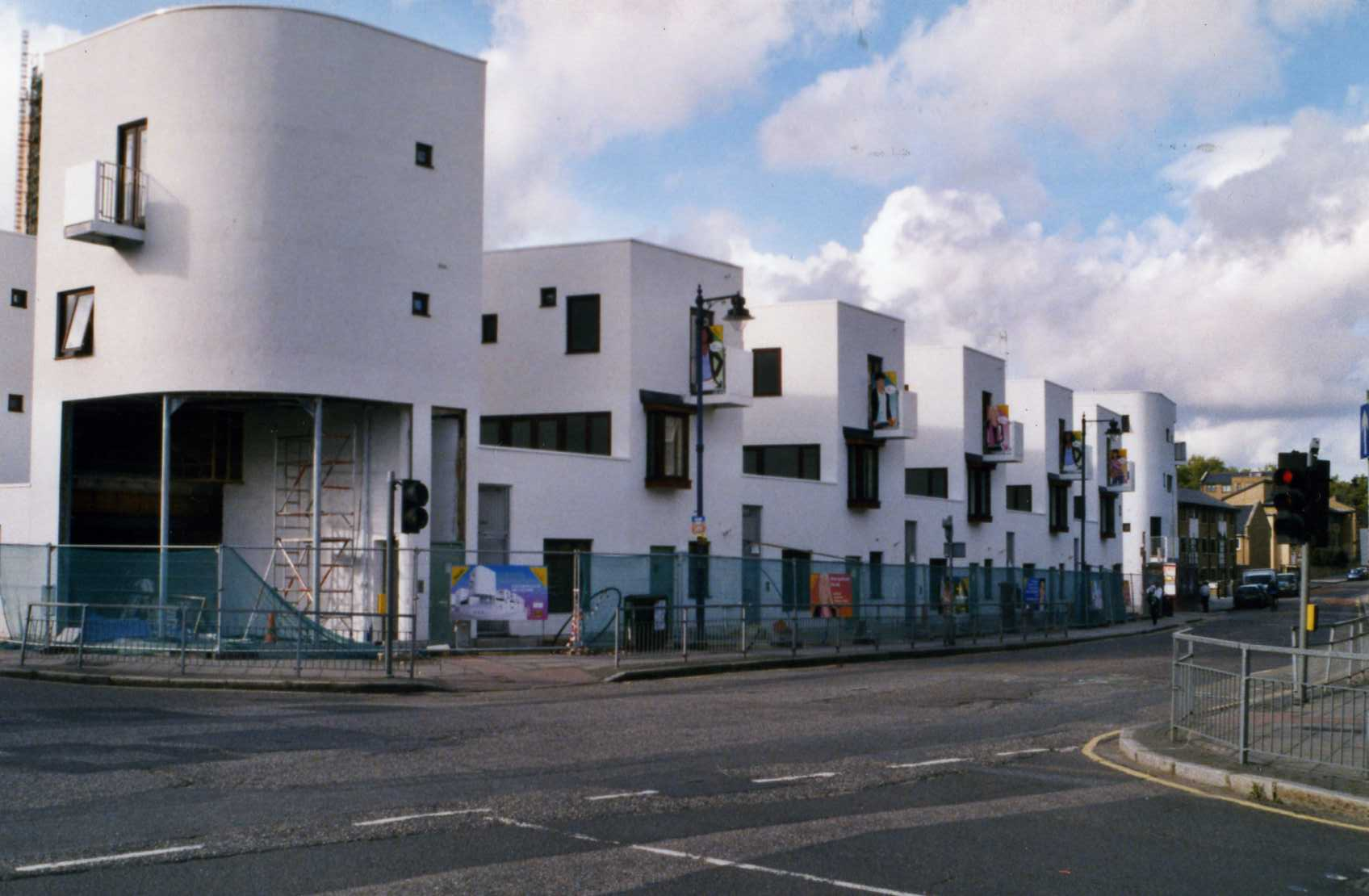
Construction work in 2004

Donnybrook Quarter is a residential district of the Old Ford area of East London. Constructed in 2006, it is a development by Peter Barber Architects. Barber cites Le Corbusier, Adolf Loos and JJP Oud as influences on the project, and said that in consultancy meetings with locals "the residents were thinking, 'Spain! Holidays! Marbella!' I'm completely happy with that."
