= Peckham Boys =

British street gang based in Peckham, London

- Founded: 1990s
- Founding location: Peckham, South London, England
- Years active: 1997–present
- Territory: Peckham (SE15), Walworth (SE17), Camberwell (SE5)
- Ethnicity: Black British
- Criminal activities: Drug trafficking, arms trafficking, robbery, murder, attempted murder, assault, extortion, stabbing
- Allies: CWS, T-Block, ABM (All Bout Money), Firehouse Crew, OTB, Wooly Road Youngers
- Rivals: Brooklyn, GAS Gang, Ghetto Boys, OC (Organised Crime), Roadside G's

The Peckham Boys, also referred to as Black Gang (due to its association with the colour black), is a multi-generational gang based in Peckham, South London. Members of the gang are generally credited with popularising the British gangsta rap style known as road rap, a style of rap accused of inciting violence. In 2011, Southwark Council identified three sets of the Peckham Boys—PYG, Anti GMG and SN1—as the most active gangs in the Peckham area.

== History ==
=== Origins ===
Nigel Cawthorne's "The World's Most Evil Gangsters" suggests Peckham's rivalries with its neighbours in Lewisham and Brixton date back to the 1950s, where local schoolboys would clash regularly. Brixton suffered much damage during the Blitz, leading to an exodus of affluent people, leaving behind unoccupied housing. Following the Second World War, new housing estates were built in Brixton, and immigrants from the Caribbean were able to move into the estates and now cheap housing of Brixton. Many young people in Brixton, and Peckham, would go to Kingsdale School in the wealthy area of Dulwich, in contrast to locals of Dulwich who preferred sending their children to private schools and grammar schools. Cawthorne's book further suggests that young people in Peckham at the time were predominantly of African (particularly Nigerian), rather than Caribbean, descent, which in turn caused a cultural clash with young people from Brixton and led to regular fights between the two groups. Gangs from the school also harassed students from affluent private schools, in turn adding to protests held by local residents that called, unsuccessfully, for the school's closure.

In time, these gangs became more established, with each generation replacing the older one. In the 1970s, gangs such as the Gloucester Grove Boys and the Night Jackyls were both based in Gloucester Grove estate, Peckham. This continued throughout the 1980s and 1990s, when there were the North Peckham Boys (based in North Peckham estate), Yellow Brick Massive (based in Bells Gardens estate, Peckham), Peckham Grove Boys (based in Peckham Grove estate), Outlaws Crew, and Acorn Crew (based in Acorn Estate, Peckham).

By the mid-1990s, some of these groups began to consolidate themselves and spread around Peckham, with the main gang now being the Peckham Boys Gangstaz. Underneath them was the Younger Peckham Boyz (YPB) for members in their mid- to late teens, and the Tiny Peckham Boyz (TPB) for the early and pre-teens.

=== Early 2000s ===
In the early 2000s, the gang was sub-divided into various subsets. Each subset generally coincided with a particular age group. The PK (Peckham Kids) set had pre-teens, YYPB (Younger Younger Peckham Boys) had early to mid-teens, YPB (Younger / Young Peckham Boys) had mid- to late teens, while the Peckham Boys set had ages ranging from 18 to 25. There was a more unofficial grouping for the older members.

On 27 November 2000, two members of the Young Peckham Boys, 13-year-old Ricky Gavin Preddie and his 12-year-old brother Danny Charles Preddie, murdered 10-year-old Damilola Taylor by stabbing him with a broken glass beer bottle during an attempted robbery on the stairs of a tower block in the North Peckham Estate.

=== Mid 2000s: peak conflict with the Ghetto Boys ===
By the mid-2000s, the names of the various subsets had begun to change again and be replaced by SN1 (Spare No-1, formerly Peckham Boys, who were now the older generation), PYG (Pecknarm Young Gunners, formerly YYPB), SI (Shoot Instant, formerly YPB), OPB (Original Peckham Boys), DFA (Don't Fuck Around or Drugz Fundz Armz), CBM (Crane Block Massive), YBM (Yellow Brick Massive), PK (Pecknarm Killaz), and the Lettsom G'z (L.G).

In October 2004, the Peckham Boys and Ghetto Boys had an infamous shootout outside the Urban Music Awards, held in the Barbican Centre, London. During the shootout at least 18 shots were exchanged. One stray shot hit an innocent bystander, Helen Kelly. The underwire of her bra deflected the bullet, preventing fatal injury. Linton Ambursley from Lewisham, a Ghetto Boys member, was jailed for 12 years after admitting wounding with intent.

On 17 September 2006, a man was shot and stabbed to death on the Woodpecker Estate in New Cross by the Peckham Boys, after being mistaken for a member of the Ghetto Boys. He was attacked by a group of approximately thirty Peckham Boys, who had travelled to New Cross on bicycles. As of 2010 the murder remains unsolved, as do five other recent murders on the Woodpecker Estate. That same night, a man was chased in Deptford by approximately 30 to 40 youths before being stabbed, but survived.

In November 2006, the Peckham Boys made it into the list of Time Out magazine's top 100 'Movers and Shakers' for the year 2006. It is a list of the most influential groups or organisations in London.

=== Late 2000s ===
In September 2007, a leader of the Peckham Boys named Marlon Granderson (whose street name was 'Raver') was jailed after being found in possession of a MAC-10 submachine gun, three Makarov handguns, two silencers, 379 rounds of ammunition, 60 thousand fake ecstasy pills, 10 ounces of cannabis and thousands of pounds' worth of cocaine. Grandison had tried to escape conviction by claiming the items actually belonged to his friend Anthony Williams, who was stabbed to death the year before outside a kebab shop. Although the handguns were linked to six unsolved gangland shootings via firearm forensics, the police could not prove that Grandison had fired them, however he was found guilty of possession of firearms and sentenced to life in prison with a minimum term of 10 years.

In September 2008, police conducted dawn raids on suspected members of the Peckham Boys gang. It is believed that the group conducted 120 robberies in what police have called a "prolific" criminal enterprise. The gang are believed to have used knives, machetes, crowbars, guns and heavy screwdrivers to ensure that their operations were successful. Those arrested were between their mid-20s and mid-30s.

In October 2008, during an exchange of shots between a member of the Ghetto Boys and a Peckham Boys member, Polish care worker Magda Pniewska was hit by a stray bullet and died. The shootout occurred in New Cross.

In July 2009, a 13-year-old boy was stabbed five times in Camberwell by the OC (Organised Crime) Gang, in a street battle with the PYG Gang from Peckham.

In September 2009, a member of the Brixton-based OC gang was jailed for shooting a bystander dead, when attempting to murder two youths from the PYG gang. The attack was in retaliation for an incident earlier that day, in which an OC member was shot by PYG.

=== Early 2010s ===
By 2010/2011, the sets of the Peckham Boys once again began to change. Crane Block (located in Pelican Estate, Peckham) and the Lettsom G'z (located in Lettsom Estate, Peckham) split away from PYG and Shoot Instant (SI). The latter two would end up merging into Anti GMG (GMG stands for "Get Money and Guns" or "Guns, Murder, and Girls").

In August 2010, the Metropolitan Police announced that they had convicted several members of the Shoot Instant Gang (an offshoot of the Peckham Boys), on charges of dealing class A drugs. The convictions were a result of a raid on Southwark-based gang members, in which a total of 80 people were arrested.

On 6 September 2010, a member of the Peckham Boys, George Ogaba, aka Taz (Young Taz/ G.O), was killed after his motorcycle was rammed by a car in Peckham. His death followed an earlier non-fatal shooting on the Lettsom Estate in Camberwell. Hours later, Rio McFarlane was visiting a makeshift shrine for George, when he was murdered in a drive-by shooting. Rio McFarlane was friends with the footballer Rio Ferdinand.

In December 2010, seventeen-year-old Sylvester Akapalara was shot dead in a tower block called Heron House on the Pelican Estate in Peckham. Akapalara was caught up in a claimed gang related dispute. It was initially reported that the youths who committed the murder were members of Brixton-based GAS Gang, but this was later found to be incorrect. They were, in fact, members of GMG. The youths involved in the murder were themselves from Peckham, and had been seen in Anti GMG videos. Nineteen-year-old David Nyamupfukudza (also known as Tiny Nutty) was sentenced to a minimum of 26 years in jail for the murder. Twenty-year-old Sodiq Adeojo (also known as Jungle) was sentenced to 30 years for his involvement in the murder. The GMG gang also warned Peckham residents against snitching.

In April 2011, a member of the Peckham Boys, 'Kyze' and 'JJ', was jailed for shooting a rival in the arm with a Glock pistol. The individual is said to have links with the rapper Giggs.

In July 2011, a member of the Peckham Boys was jailed for a minimum of 32 years for arranging an execution from his prison cell. Ola Apena, linked to the 'Shoot Instant' branch of the Peckham Boys, arranged the execution-style murder and burning of teenager Samuel Ogunro in 2010, to prevent him from snitching.

In February 2012, three members of the Peckham Boys received life imprisonment for the murder of 18-year-old Daniel Graham in East Dulwich. The victim was stabbed 24 times by the GMG set of the gang, on a main road in full view of passengers on a 176 bus and passing traffic.

In February 2012, a member of the SN1 set of the Peckham Boys was jailed for eight years, for causing over £1 million worth of damage during the 2011 London riots.

In May 2012, two members of the GMG set of the Peckham Boys were jailed for life, for the murder of 17-year-old athlete Sylvester Akapalara and attempted murder of two others. The GMG gang also warned Peckham residents against snitching.

In April 2014, a man was sentenced to a minimum of 35 years in prison for the shooting of Rio MacFarlane in Peckham. The victim was an innocent bystander in a shootout between the PYG and Lettsom Boys.

=== Mid 2010s-present ===
In the mid-late 2010s, a new Peckham-based group emerged known as Zone 2. The group sometimes refers to itself as 'Peckham Boys', and references the Peckham Boys in its music.

In 2019, a fictional story based on the conflict between the Peckham Boys and Ghetto Boys was depicted in the film Blue Story.
