= Angell Town =

Neighbourhood in Lambeth, south London

Angell Town Estate
- Interactive map of Angell Town Estate

General information
- Location: Angell Town, Lambeth, London
- Coordinates: 51.4695°N 0.1099°W

Construction
- Authority: London Borough of Lambeth

Other information
- Famous residents: Dora Boatemah

Angell Town is an area in Brixton, in the London Borough of Lambeth, south London. The area is dominated by the Angell Town Estate, a housing estate known for its poverty, deprivation and gang subculture.

The Angell Town Estate was originally built in the 1970s as a set of blocks linked by a deck-access system. Following the efforts of local resident and community leader Dora Boatemah, the estate was extensively redeveloped in the early 2000s in an attempt to remove the architectural problems that had exacerbated the estate's social problems.

The neighbourhood, which predates the estate, was named after John Angell, and first developed in the mid 19th century. The local parish is St John, Angell Town, Brixton, in the Diocese of Southwark, and the local church is St John the Evangelist Church, Angell Town, originally constructed in 1852–3. The area has a small park, Angell Town Park, at the centre of the estate. The local school is St John's Angell Town Church of England Primary School.

Nearby railway stations are Brixton railway station and Loughborough Junction railway station. Max Roach Park lies to the south, and Myatt's Fields Park to the north-east.

== History ==
The area was owned by John Angell, also known as "John the Testator", or "John of Stockwell". John Angell lived in Stockwell, London and was buried at the Angell family seat of Crowhurst in Surrey. He owned land and property in many counties and seems to have been somewhat of an eccentric. He died in 1784.

The properties on Angell Park Gardens and Angell Road, S.W.9 had once been elegant town houses. There is also a pub called the 'Angell Arms'. John died without issue and bequeathed money for housing, a church and a school, both called "St John's".

There is a will dated 21 September 1774, of which the original copy is held at the P.R.O - Ref: L.PROB10/2997 1C/409. It was written by John Angell himself in 1774 and is somewhat difficult to read.

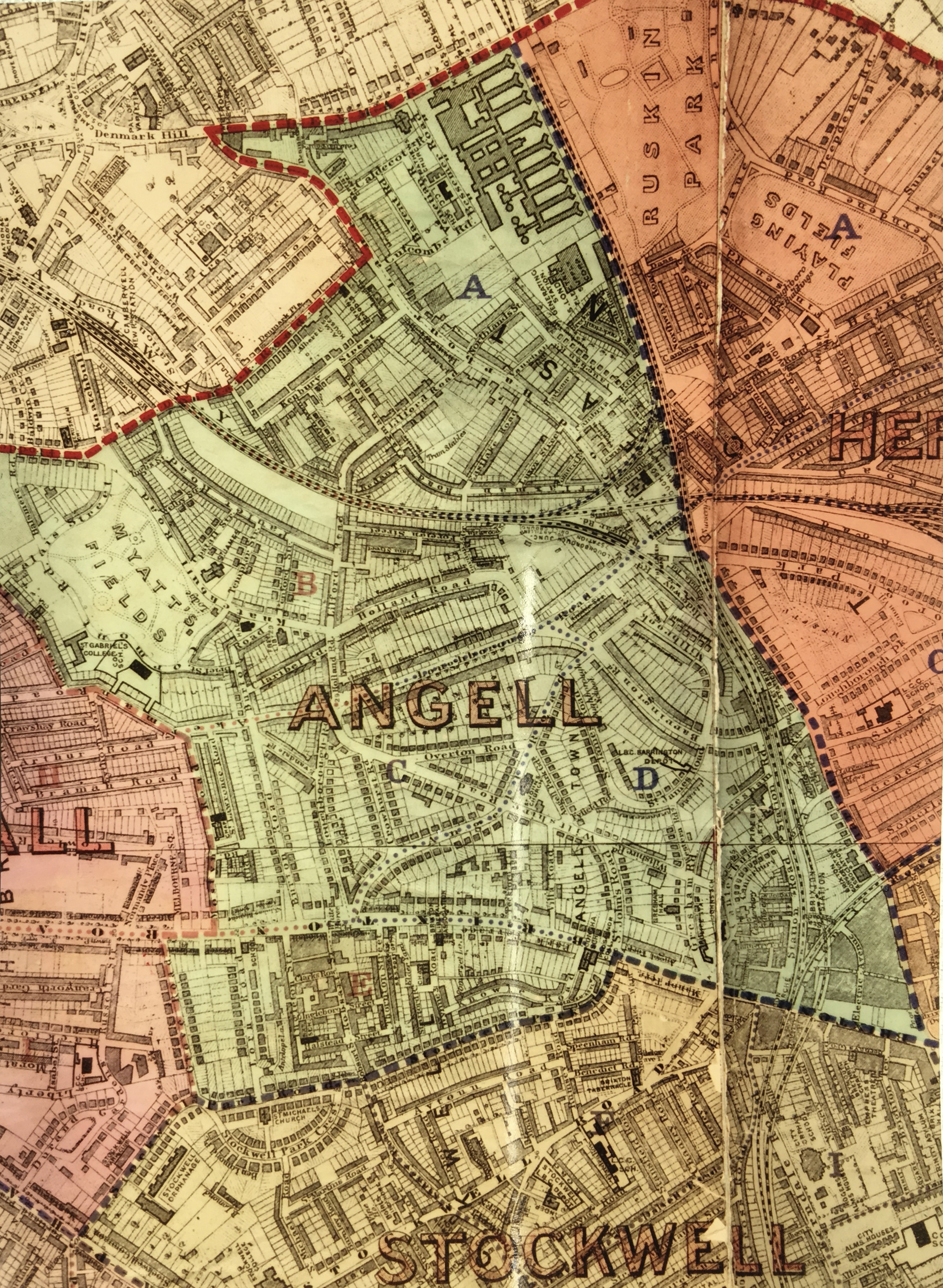
Angell estate owned and bequeathed by John Angell in 1784

The John Angell that wrote the will is the son of John and Caroline Angell and the grandson of Justinian (John) Angell and the great great grandson of William Angell.

This William was the original purchaser of Crowhurst. William served as a purveyor of fish to Queen Elizabeth I by 1594 and later held the position of Sergeant of the Acatery under Kings James I and Charles I. In this role, he was responsible for provisioning the royal household with food supplies.

The will references the family’s inherited estate, originally acquired by William and expanded through Justinian’s (also known as John) marriage to Elizabeth Scaldwell.

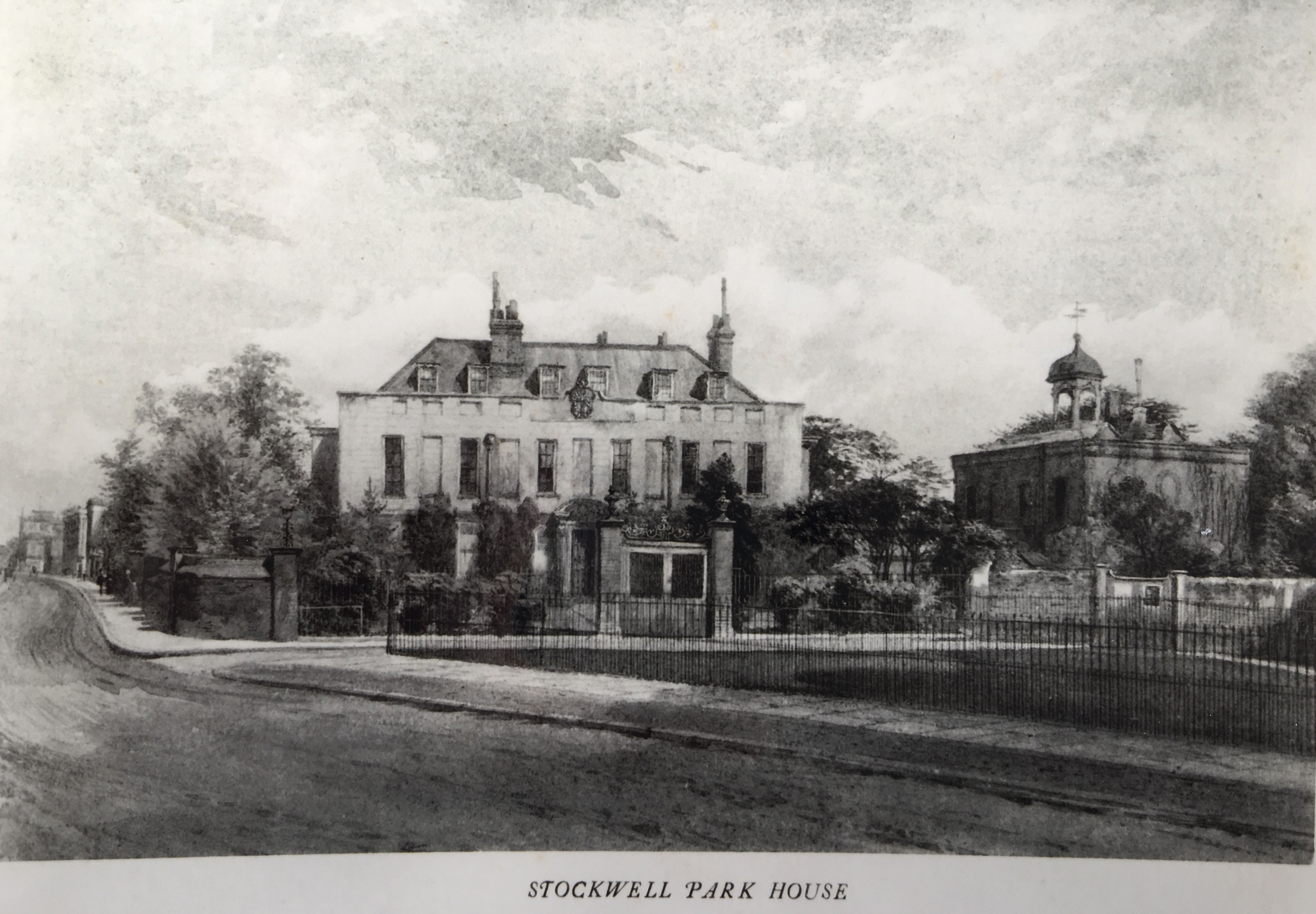
Stockwell House

== See also ==
- Rosemarie Mallett
