= Nicolò =

Nicolò (Italian: [nikoˈlɔ]) is an Italian male given name. Another variation is Niccolò, most common in Tuscany. A nicolo is an onyx bearing an intaglio (see #See also).

Nicolò may refer to:

== Arts ==
- Nicolò Amati (1596–1684), Italian luthier
- Nicolò Barabino (1832–1891), Italian painter
- Nicolò Beregan (1627–1713), Italian lawyer and librettist
- Nicolò Bonito, 18th century Italian painter
- Nicolò Brancaleon, artist
- Nicolò Coccon (1826–1903), Italian composer
- Nicolò Corradini (1585–1646), Italian composer
- Nicolo Dorigati (1869–1736), Italian painter
- Nicolò Filippucci (born 2006), Italian singer-songwriter
- Nicolò Fumo (1647–1725), Italian sculptor and architect
- Nicolò Gabrielli, composer
- Nicolò Gagliano, violin-maker
- Nicolò Grassi (1682–1748), Italian painter
- Nicolò Isouard (1773–1818), French composer
- Nicolò Minato, poet
- Nicolò Mineo (1934–2023), Italian poet
- Nicolò Pacassi, architect
- Nicolo Pasetti, Italian-American actor
- Nicolò Pizzolo, 15th century Italian painter
- Nicolò Rapisarda, Italian rapper

== Political figures ==
- Nicolò Albertini, statesman
- Nicolò Carandini (1896–1972), Italian politician
- Nicolò Cattaneo Della Volta (1679–1751), Doge of Genoa
- Nicolò Contarini (1553–1631), Doge of Venice
- Nicolò Crasso (1585–1656), Venetian politician and writer
- Nicolò da Ponte (1491–1585), Doge of Venice
- Nicolò Donato (1539–1618), Doge of Venice
- Nicolò Erizzo (1722–1806), Venetian diplomat
- Nicolò Guarco (1325–1385), Doge of Genoa
- Nicolò Marcello (1399–1474), Doge of Venice
- Nicolò Miglani, 13th century Venetian diplomat
- Nicolò Molin (1562–1608), Venetian ambassador
- Nicolò Navigajoso, 13th century Venetian diplomat
- Nicolò Spinola (1677–1743), Doge of Genoa
- Nicolò Tron (1399–1473), Doge of Venice
- Nicolò Tron (diplomat) (1685–1771), Venetian diplomat
- Nicolò Venier (1483–1530), Venetian nobleman
- Nicolò Zeno, Venetian nobleman
- Nicolò Zanon, judge

== Religious figures ==
- Nicolò Acciapacci (1383–1447), Neapolitan bishop and cardinal
- Nicolo Bocassini (1240–1304), Pope Benedict XI
- Nicolò Cortese (1907–1944), Italian priest
- Nicolò Leti 17th century Bishop of Acquapendente
- Nicolò Longobardo (1559–1654), Jesuit missionary to China
- Nicolò Malermi (1422–1481), Italian Biblical scholar
- Nicolò Matafari, 14th century Archbishop of Zadar
- Nicolò Niconisi, 16th century Bishop of Ston
- Nicolò Ormanetto, 16th century Bishop of Padua
- Nicolò Antonio Pesci (1486–1517), Bishop of Muro Lucano
- Nicolò Rusca (1563–1618), Italian martyr
- Nicolò Sfondrato (1535–1591), Pope Gregory XIV
- Nicolò Stizzia (1542–1596), Bishop of Cefalù
- Nicolò Trevisan, 15th century Bishop of Ceneda
- Nicolò Vernely, 16th century Bishop of Bagnoregio

== Sport ==
- Nicolò Armini, Italian footballer
- Nicolò Barella, Italian footballer
- Nicolò Barattieri, Italian engineer
- Nicolò Bertola, Italian footballer
- Nicolò Bianchi, Italian footballer
- Nicolò Brighenti, Italian footballer
- Nicolò Bruschi, Italian footballer
- Nicolò Bulega, Italian motorcycle racer
- Nicolò Buratti, Italian cyclist
- Nicolò Cambiaghi. Italian footballer
- Nicolò Carucci, Italian rower
- Nicolò Casale, Italian footballer
- Nicolò Cavuoti, Italian footballer
- Nicolò Cherubin, Italian football coach
- Nicolò Cocetta, Italian footballer
- Nicolò Contiliano, Italian footballer
- Nicolò Corradini, Italian skier
- Nicolò Corticchia, Italian footballer
- Nicolò Cudrig, Italian footballer
- Nicolò Fagioli, Italian footballer
- Nicolò Fazzi, Italian footballer
- Nicolò Lolli, Italian footballer
- Nicolò Martinenghi, Italian swimmer
- Nicolò Melli, Italian basketball player
- Nicolò Napoli, Italian football manager
- Nicolò Nicolosi (1912–1986), Italian football manager
- Nicolò Palazzolo, Italian footballer
- Nicolò Parisini, Italian cyclist
- Nicolò Pozzebon, Italian footballer
- Nicolò Rode (1912–1998), Italian Olympic medalist
- Nicolò Rovella, Italian footballer
- Nicolò Rocca, Italian racing driver
- Nicolò Savona, Italian footballer
- Nicolò Teneggi, Italian rugby player
- Nicolò Tronci (1905–1986), Italian gymnast
- Nicolò Tresoldi, Italian footballer
- Nicolò Turco, Italian footballer
- Nicolò Verzeni, Italian footballer
- Nicolò Zaniolo, Italian footballer

== Other ==
- Nicolò Barbaro, Venetian surgeon present at the Fall of Constantinople
- Nicolò Carosio (1907–1984), Italian sports journalist
- Nicolò D'Amico (1953–2020), Italian astronomer
- Nicolò Degiorgis (born 1985), Italian publisher
- Nicolò Egidi, chemist
- Nicolo Giraud, friend of the English Romantic poet Lord Byron
- Nicolò Petrucci, Italian engineer
- Nicolò Pollari, general
- Nicolo Rizzuto (1924–2010), Italian-Canadian mobster
- Nicolo Schiro, mobster
- Nicolo Tartaglia (1499–1557), Italian mathematician

== See also ==
- Niccolò (disambiguation)
- Nicolao
- Nicolo, an onyx worked to produce an intaglio in blue and black
- San Nicolò (disambiguation)

Nicolo, type of cut decorative stone

- Vishnu nicolo seal
