= 2023–24 SPAL season =

SPAL
2023–24 season
- Manager: Domenico Di Carlo (until 2 October); Leonardo Colucci (from 3 October until 4 February); Domenico Di Carlo (from 5 February)
- Stadium: Stadio Paolo Mazza
- Serie C Group B: 11th
- Coppa Italia Serie C: Second round
- Top goalscorer: League: Mirko Antenucci (4); All: Mirko Antenucci (4)
Home colours	Away colours
- All statistics correct as of 19 November 2023.

The 2023–24 season is SPAL's 117th season in existence and first one back in the Serie C. They are also competing in the Coppa Italia Serie C.

== Players ==
=== First-team squad ===
As of 1 September 2023

Note: Flags indicate national team as defined under FIFA eligibility rules; some limited exceptions apply. Players may hold more than one non-FIFA nationality.

No.	Pos.	Nation	Player
1	GK	ITA	Enrico Alfonso
2	DF	ITA	Alessandro Fiordaliso
3	DF	ITA	Matteo Bruscagin
4	DF	ARG	Nahuel Valentini
5	MF	ITA	Nicolò Contiliano
6	MF	ITA	Marco Bertini (on loan from Lazio)
7	FW	ITA	Mirco Antenucci (captain)
8	MF	ITA	Riccardo Collodel
9	FW	ITA	Alessandro Orfei
11	FW	ITA	Simone Rabbi
14	MF	ITA	Fabio Parravicini
16	DF	ITA	Filippo Saiani
17	MF	ITA	Giuseppe Iglio
19	FW	ITA	Nicola Dalmonte (on loan from Vicenza)
20	FW	LAT	Dario Šits (on loan from Parma)

No.	Pos.	Nation	Player
21	DF	ITA	Raffaele Celia
22	GK	ITA	Marco Meneghetti
23	DF	ITA	Matteo Arena
25	MF	ITA	Marco Carraro
26	FW	ITA	Luca Siligardi
27	DF	POL	Patryk Peda (on loan from Palermo)
28	GK	ITA	Mattia Del Favero
33	DF	ITA	Alessandro Tripaldelli
34	DF	AUT	Philipp Breit
37	MF	ITA	Fabio Maistro
44	DF	MDA	Daniel Dumbravanu
75	FW	ITA	Emanuele Rao
77	FW	ITA	Marco Rosafio
80	FW	ITA	Filippo Puletto

=== Out on loan ===
As of 1 September 2023

Note: Flags indicate national team as defined under FIFA eligibility rules; some limited exceptions apply. Players may hold more than one non-FIFA nationality.

No.	Pos.	Nation	Player
—	GK	ITA	Lorenzo Abati (at Torino)
—	GK	ITA	Cesare Galeotti (at Lumezzane)
—	GK	ITA	Michele Pezzolato (at Forlì)
—	GK	SEN	Demba Thiam (at Juve Stabia)
—	DF	POL	Dawid Bugaj (at Lechia Gdańsk)
—	DF	ITA	Lorenzo Dickmann (at Brescia)
—	DF	SVK	Michal Svoboda (at Bologna)
—	DF	ITA	Filippo Tosi (at Genoa)

No.	Pos.	Nation	Player
—	MF	MDA	Cristian Antonciuc (at Sassuolo)
—	MF	ITA	Alessandro Boccia (at Frosinone)
—	MF	ITA	Simone Cecere (at Fidelis Andria)
—	MF	ITA	Antonio Imputato (at Mestre)
—	MF	ITA	Alessandro Murgia (at Hermannstadt)
—	MF	TOG	Steven Nador (at Ancona)
—	FW	ITA	Ludovico D'Orazio (at Novara)
—	FW	ITA	Andrea La Mantia (at Feralpisalò)

== Transfers ==
=== In ===
Pos.	Player	Transferred from	Fee	Date	Source
FW	(Italy) Andrea La Mantia	(Italy) Empoli	€1,000,000	1 July 2023	
FW	(Italy) Mirco Antenucci	(Italy) Bari	Free	13 July 2023	
MF	(Italy) Marco Carraro	(Italy) Atalanta	Free	1 August 2023	

=== Out ===
Pos.	Player	Transferred to	Fee	Date	Source
MF	(Belgium) Radja Nainggolan	Released		1 July 2023	
MF	(Greece) Giannis Fetfatzidis	(Cyprus) APOEL	Free	1 July 2023	
MF	(Morocco) Ayoub Abou	(Bulgaria) Pirin Blagoevgrad	Free	14 July 2023	
GK	(Senegal) Demba Thiam	(Italy) Juve Stabia	Loan	20 July 2023	
FW	(Italy) Andrea La Mantia	(Italy) Feralpisalò	Loan	8 August 2023	

== Pre-season and friendlies ==
Win Draw Loss Fixtures

24 July 2023 Friendly	Napoli (Italy)	1–1	(Italy) SPAL	Dimaro
18:30 CEST (UTC+2)	Zambo Anguissa 73'		Puletto 63'	Stadium: Campo Sportivo Dimaro; Referee: Paride Tremolada

27 August 2023 Friendly	SPAL (Italy)	0–0	(Italy) Atalanta U23
20:00 CEST (UTC+2)

== Competitions ==
=== Overall record ===
Competition	First match	Last match	Starting round	Final position	Record							
Competition	First match	Last match	Starting round	Final position	Pld	W	D	L	GF	GA	GD	Win %
Serie C	2 September 2023	28 April 2024	Matchday 1		37	11	13	13	37	39	−2	29.73
Coppa Italia Serie C	5 October 2023	9 November 2023	First round	Second round	2	1	0	1	2	2	+0	50.00
Total					39	12	13	14	39	41	−2	30.77

Last updated: 21 April 2024
Source: Soccerway

=== Serie C ===
==== League table ====
Pos	Team	Pld	W	D	L	GF	GA	GD	Pts	Qualification
9	Pontedera	38	14	10	14	53	54	−1	52	Group play-offs 1st round
10	Rimini	38	14	8	16	52	54	−2	50	Group play-offs 1st round
11	SPAL	38	12	13	13	41	40	+1	49	
12	Lucchese	38	11	12	15	34	43	−9	45 (Note: Lucchese are ahead of Virtus Entella and Pineto on head-to-head points: Lucchese 7, Virtus Entella 3, Pineto 3. Virtus Entella are ahead of Pineto on overall goal difference: Virtus Entella -2, Pineto -4.)	
13	Virtus Entella	38	11	12	15	33	35	−2	45	

Updated to match(es) played on 28 April 2024. Source: Lega Pro, Soccerway (in English)
Rules for classification: 1) Points; 2) Head-to-head points; 3) Head-to-head goal difference; 4) Goal difference; 5) Goals scored; 6) Lower goals against; 7) Wins; 8) Lower losses; 9) Away wins; 10) Lower home losses.
(Note: Head-to-head record is used only after all the matches between the teams in question have been played)

==== Results summary ====
Overall								Home						Away					
Pld	W	D	L	GF	GA	GD	Pts	W	D	L	GF	GA	GD	W	D	L	GF	GA	GD
37	11	13	13	37	39	−2	46	7	7	5	20	15	+5	4	6	8	17	24	−7

Last updated: 21 April 2024.
Source: Worldfootball

==== Results by round ====
Round	1	2	3	4	5	6	7	8	9	10	11	12	13	14	15	16	17	18	19	20	21	22	23	24	25	26	27	28	29	30	31	32	33	34	35	36	37	38
Ground	H	A	H	A	H	A	H	H	A	H	A	A	H	A	H	A	H	A	H	A	H	A	H	A	H	A	A	H	A	H	H	A	H	A	H	A	H	A
Result	W	L	L	W	D	L	L	D	L	W	D	L	L	L	D	D	D	D	W	D	D	L	L	L	W	W	D	D	W	L	W	L	D	D	W	W	W	
Position	7	11	15	9	11	11	14	12	17	14	14	17	18	18	19	18	19	19	17	17	17	18	18	18	17	17	16	16	15	16	14	14	15	15	15	13	11	

Updated to match(es) played on 21 April 2024. Source: Worldfootball
A = Away; H = Home; W = Win; D = Draw; L = Loss

==== Matches ====
The league fixtures were unveiled on 7 August 2023.

2 September 2023 1	SPAL	1–0	Vis Pesaro	Ferrara
20:45 CEST (UTC+2)	Tonucci 53' (o.g.)	Report		Stadium: Stadio Paolo Mazza; Referee: Giorgio Vergaro

15 September 2023 3	SPAL	1–2	Perugia	Ferrara
20:45 CEST (UTC+2)	Valentini 6'	Report	Iannoni 41'; Vázquez 45'	Stadium: Stadio Paolo Mazza; Referee: Niccolo Turrini

19 September 2023 4	Juventus Next Gen	0–1	SPAL	Alessandria
20:45 CEST (UTC+2)		Report	Bertini 90+1'	Stadium: Stadio Giuseppe Moccagatta; Referee: Fabrizio Ramondino

27 September 2023 2	Cesena	3–1	SPAL	Cesena
20:45 CEST (UTC+2)	Shpendi 2', 35'; Corazza 78'	Report	Antenucci 89'	Stadium: Stadio Dino Manuzzi; Referee: Michele Delrio

1 October 2023 6	Recanatese	1–0	SPAL	Recanati
20:45 CEST (UTC+2)	Morrone 19'	Report	Puletto (yellow card) 30' (yellow-red card) 46'	Stadium: Stadio Nicola Tubaldi; Referee: Luigi Catanoso

8 October 2023 7	SPAL	1–2	Pescara	Ferrara
18:30 CEST (UTC+2)	Celia 42'	Report	Tunjov 21' (pen.); Cangiano 90'	Stadium: Stadio Paolo Mazza; Referee: Stefano Nicolini

11 October 2023 5	SPAL	2–2	Lucchese	Ferrara
16:15 CEST (UTC+2)	Peda 30'; Rao 66'		Guadagni 43'; Benassai 54'	Stadium: Stadio Paolo Mazza; Referee: Filippo Giaccaglia

15 October 2023 8	SPAL	0–0	Fermana	Ferrara
18:30 CEST (UTC+2)	Bruscagin (yellow card) 80' (yellow-red card) 90+1'		Montini (yellow card) 89' (yellow-red card) 90+3'	Stadium: Stadio Paolo Mazza; Referee: Lorenzo Maccarini

23 October 2023 9	Arezzo	3–1	SPAL	Arezzo
20:45 CEST (UTC+2)	Gucci 34', 72'; Mawuli 38'		Fiordaliso 64'	Stadium: Stadio Città di Arezzo; Referee: Leonardo Mastropasqua

26 October 2023 10	SPAL	1–0	Sestri Levante	Ferrara
18:30 CEST (UTC+2)	Bertini 68'			Stadium: Stadio Paolo Mazza; Referee: Filippo Colaninno

29 October 2023 11	Torres	1–1	SPAL	Sassari
14:00 CET (UTC+1)	Scotto (red card) 14'; Mastinu (yellow card) 26'; Diakité 55'		Collodel 5'; Bertini (yellow card) 8'; Bruscagin (yellow card) 25'; Rao (yellow card) 38' (yellow-red card) 40'; Puletto (yellow card) 76'	Stadium: Stadio Vanni Sanna; Referee: Enrico Gigliotti

6 November 2023 12	Rimini	1–0	SPAL	Rimini
20:30 CET (UTC+1)	Morra 63'			Stadium: Stadio Romeo Neri; Referee: Valerio Crezzini

12 November 2023 13	SPAL	0–1	Pontedera	Ferrara
20:45 CET (UTC+1)			Catanese 67'	Stadium: Stadio Paolo Mazza; Referee: Mattia Drigo

19 November 2023 14	Carrarese	1–0	SPAL	Carrara
16:15 CET (UTC+1)	Panico 90+5'			Stadium: Stadio dei Marmi; Referee: Manuel Sacchi

25 November 2023 15	SPAL	2–2	Ancona	Ferrara
16:15 CET (UTC+1)	Peda 13'; Rosafio 69'		Paolucci 6'; Spagnoli 77'	Stadium: Stadio Paolo Mazza; Referee: Abdoulaye Diop

2 December 2023 16	Gubbio	0–0	SPAL	Gubbio
18:30 CET (UTC+1)				Stadium: Stadio Pietro Barbetti; Referee: Erminio Cerbasi

9 December 2023 17	SPAL	0–0	Virtus Entella	Ferrara
18:30 CET (UTC+1)				Stadium: Stadio Paolo Mazza; Referee: Valerio Vogliacco

16 December 2023 18	Pineto	1–1	SPAL	Pineto
20:45 CET (UTC+1)	Volpicelli 64'		Rabbi 48'	Stadium: Stadio Mimmo Pavone-Alessandro Mariani; Referee: Edoardo Manedo Mazzoni

23 December 2023 19	SPAL	2–0	Olbia	Ferrara
18:30 CET (UTC+1)	Bassoli 40'; Valentini 85'			Stadium: Stadio Paolo Mazza; Referee: Francesco Burlando

6 January 2024 20	Vis Pesaro	1–1	SPAL	Pesaro
16:15 CET (UTC+1)				Stadium: Stadio Tonino Benelli

7 April 2024 35	SPAL	3–0	Gubbio	Ferrara
18:30 CET (UTC+1)				Stadium: Stadio Paolo Mazza; Referee: Simone Galipò

14 April 2024 36	Virtus Entella	1–2	SPAL	Chiavari
16:15 CET (UTC+1)				Stadium: Stadio Comunale

21 April 2024 37	SPAL	2–0	Pineto	Ferrara
16:30 CET (UTC+1)				Stadium: Stadio Paolo Mazza

28 April 2024 38	Olbia	v	SPAL	Olbia
20:00 CET (UTC+1)				Stadium: Stadio Bruno Nespoli

=== Coppa Italia Serie C ===
5 October 2023 First round	SPAL	2–0	Sestri Levante	Ferrara
18:30 CEST (UTC+2)	Rabbi 13'; Rosafio 35'			Stadium: Stadio Paolo Mazza; Attendance: 839; Referee: Mattia Drigo

9 November 2023 Second round	SPAL	0–2 (a.e.t.)	Lucchese	Ferrara
20:45 CET (UTC+1)			Rizzo Pinna 102'; Magnaghi 117'	Stadium: Stadio Paolo Mazza; Attendance: 844; Referee: Giorgio Bozzetto
