= Bono da Ferrara =

Italian painter

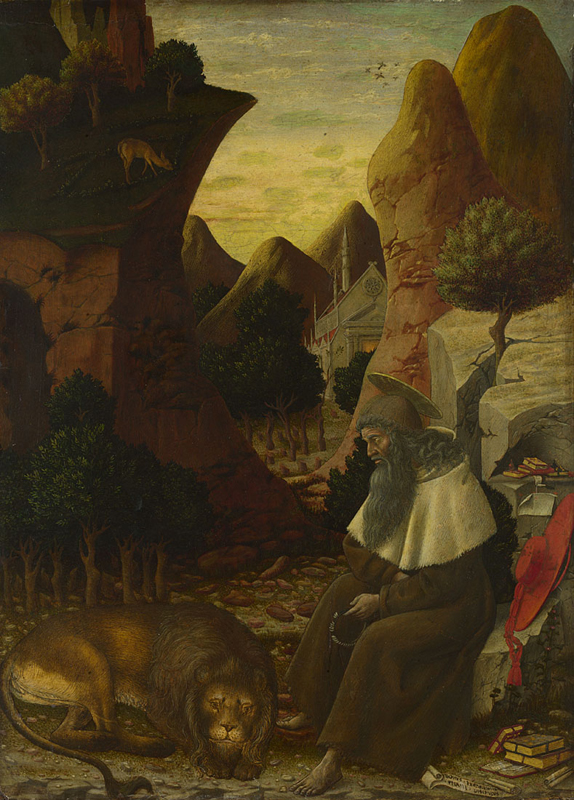
Saint Jerome in a Landscape, ca. 1440, now in the National Gallery, London

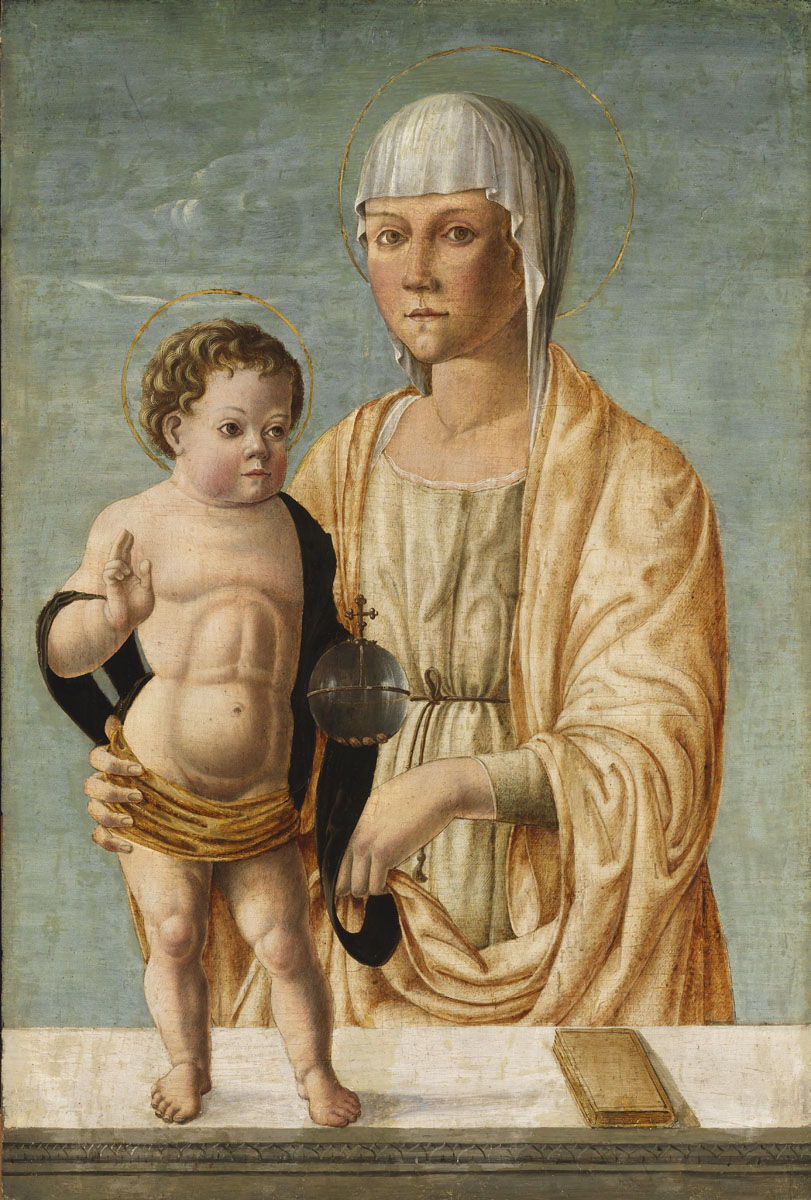
Madonna and Child, Szépművészeti Múzeum, Budapest

Pisanello, Saint George and the Princess, Sant'Anastasia, Verona

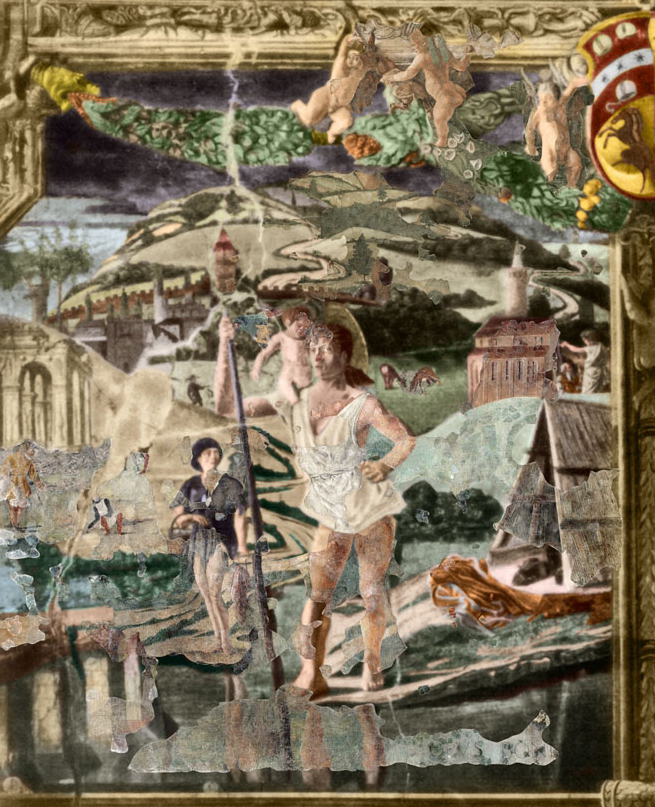
St Christopher Carries the Christus Child, Cappella Ovetari, Church of the Eremitani, Padua

Bono da Ferrara or Bono Ferrarese (* after 1420, probably Ferrara, † after 1461) was an Italian painter who worked in Ferrara, Padua and Siena around the middle of the 15th century. He was initially a student of Pisanello in the 1430s, whom he probably assisted with his St. George's mural of Sant'Anastasia in Verona. Due to his peculiar style of high contrast, emphasizing contour and shadow, a collection of about 70 drawings can be attributed to him, which have been preserved in Pisanello's pattern books. His style is also evident in painting, in his only signed panel painting of St. Jerome in a Landscape in London (around 1440). Later he worked with Andrea Mantegna in Padua, where the fresco of St. Christopher (1451) in the Ovetari Chapel is the second and last painting signed by him. His works can be assigned to the Early Renaissance, but also exhibit late Gothic features.

== Life ==
Neither his origins nor his biographical details are known. He is documented as a painter for a period of approximately 20 years between 1442 and 1461. His name first appears (on January 10, 1442) in connection with works carried out in the Siena Cathedral between 1441 and 1442. Prior to this, he likely apprenticed to Antonio Pisanello, who was in Verona in the 1430s. In the church of Sant'Anastasia there, marginal figures in the fresco depicting the Legend of St. George can be stylistically attributed to Bono. The painting of St. Jerome in the Desert, previously attributed to Pisanello, also links him to this master. The work, located in the National Gallery in London, bears the signature "Bonus Ferrariensis Pisani discipulus" on a veristically painted panel, the authenticity of which has been unjustifiably questioned in the past. As a student of Pisanello, Bono appears to have immersed himself entirely in Pisanello's Late Gothic style in the London work and is therefore dated as an early work from around 1440, soon after his training.

In Padua, a house belonging to Bono is mentioned in 1449, where the painter Baldassarre Tedesco (Baldesar todescus) lived, with whom he may have collaborated. In Ferrara, he appears in the ducal expense books of 1450. He is also mentioned in the Este Memorials between 1450 and 1452. In 1450, he frescoed the stables, loggia, battlements, and fireplaces at the Este estate in Migliaro, the Delizia Migliaro, for Duke Borso. Further work for the Este family followed, for example, in their hunting lodge in Casaglia, a town northwest of Ferrara, and in the studiolo presumably of the Delizia in Belfiore. He then worked in the house of Pellegrino Pasini, a favorite of Borso. All of these works, however, have been lost.

At the same time, Bono da Ferrara must have been active in Padua, as he is documented there again in 1451, when he signed the Saint Christopher Carrying the Jesus Child in the Church of the Eremitani "OPVS BONI". The fresco cycle of the Cappella Ovetari was executed under the direction of Andrea Mantegna. Since he was not a member of the local painters' guild, shortly after the payment, he was asked not to work or have any work done in the city. In 1461, Bono again stayed in Siena, where possible works have not yet been identified. He is no longer documented after 1461.

== Work ==
While in Saint Christopher in Padua he shows familiarity with Piero della Francesca and Andrea del Castagno both in the landscape and in the figures, the additive style, for example of the two fawns as staffage, and the detailed but unconvincing integration of the figures into the spatial representation, point to Pisanello's elegant, soft, stage-like style. In contrast to Pisanello's beautiful naturalism, Bono had a "tendency toward emphasized, even harsh descriptions of space and body," whose graphic formalism "led to exaggerations at the expense of artistic sensitivity and harmony." This is most evident in a series of studies of mostly male heads, which probably date from his early period in Verona. He drew a warrior in armor in a series of "methodological variations" based on the same model.

The head studies, comprising 50 of the approximately 70 drawings, make up the largest part of the collection that Degenhart and Schmitt were able to attribute to Bono in Pisanello's sample books in the mid-1990s. Eleven further sheets depict horse heads related to the fresco in Sant'Anastasia, as well as final drawings of Madonnas and saints. All drawings attributed to Bono are in ink upon metalpoint on sanguine paper.

Some sheets, of course, are modeled on Pisanello's works, including preparatory drawings for his fresco in the Palazzo Ducale in Mantua. However, unlike Pisanello, Bono failed to create inner, emotional movement in his figures, which is particularly evident in the Madonnas. A half-length figure of the Madonna (2623 verso) is based on a model by the Limbourg brothers. Bono's depiction of physiognomic movements often resulted in "a violent, even grotesque fixation of facial expressions." Three drawings attached to the head studies are profile portraits based on ancient coins, such as 2593 recto, which he copied from a 3rd century Roman coin of Emperor Maximinus I Thrax, enlarged to full size of the sheet. On its reverse is one of a few studies of body parts, depicting a forearm with a foreshortened, supporting hand, similar to the hip-hugging hand of the much later figure of St. Christopher. Even before working with Mantegna, Bono was already familiar with the idea of perspective representation.

Disassembled, separated in the crease of the double pages, and later reassembled by the Milanese art dealer Giuseppe Vallardi (according to him, from two books), the Corpus Vallardi came to the Louvre in 1855. A few individual sheets can also be found in the Biblioteca Ambrosiana in Milan. The sample drawings, originally arranged by motif, have remained together to this day. The halved sheets measured approximately 20 × 28.5 cm (mostly slightly trimmed today), and Vallardi had already glued drawings spanning double pages back together. Fifteen of the head studies attributed to Bono also bear a pig watermark, not otherwise found in Pisanello's work. Four horse heads are on paper with a bell, a watermark used in Verona since the 14th century.

Between the only two signed works, Saint Jerome and Saint Christopher, one can place depictions of Saints John the Baptist and Prosdocimus, the first Bishop of Padua (formerly in the Harris Collection, London), which mark Bono's transition from his beginnings, influenced by Pisanello, to a phase oriented towards Tuscany, or rather, antiquity, the Early Renaissance. From the same period as the frescoes in Padua, but almost certainly painted in Ferrara, are the Madonna and Child in the Szépművészeti Múzeum in Budapest, whose composition combines the themes of his stay in Tuscany, and the panel with Saint John the Baptist, formerly in the Vendeghini collection in Ferrara and now in the possession of the Ferrara Savings Bank. In the Galleries of Dresden and Munich are also paintings assigned to him.

Drawings from the Corpus Vallardi (Louvre)

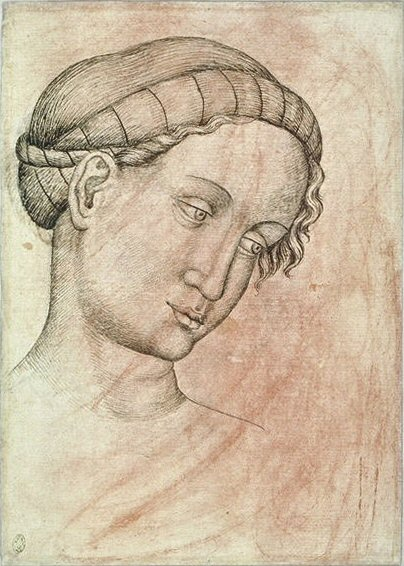
2589 verso

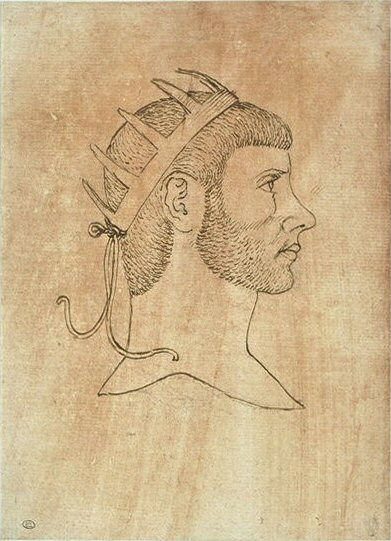
2592 recto

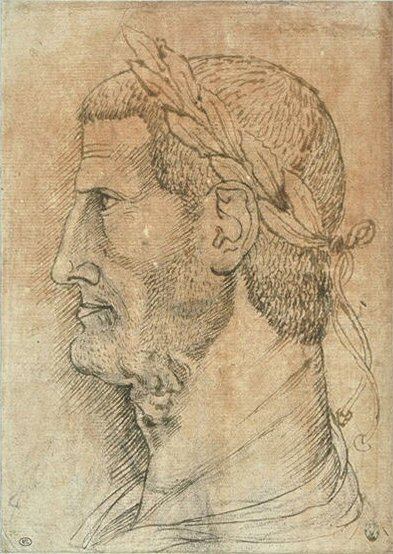
2593 recto

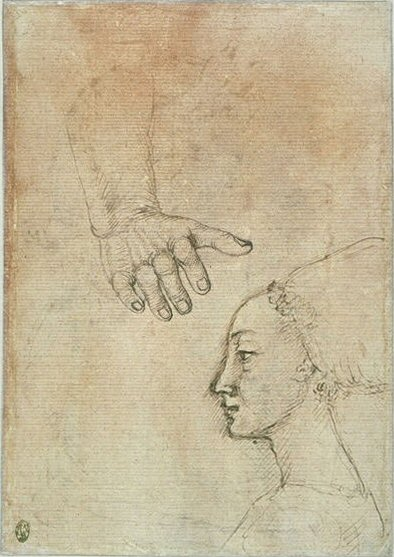
2593 verso

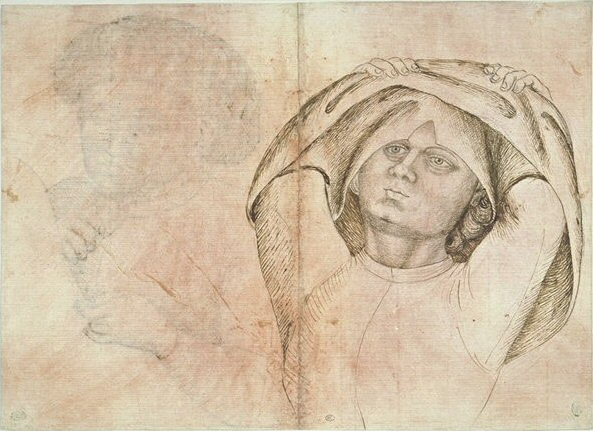
2597 recto

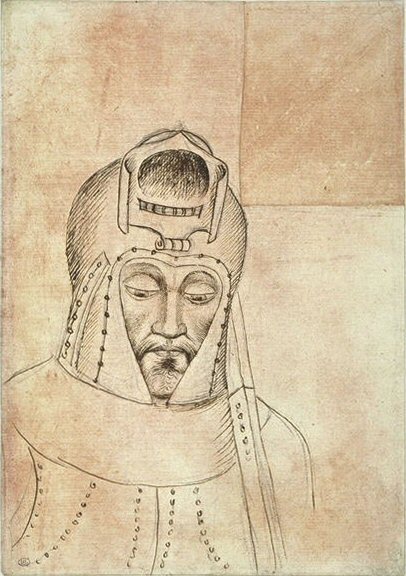
2611

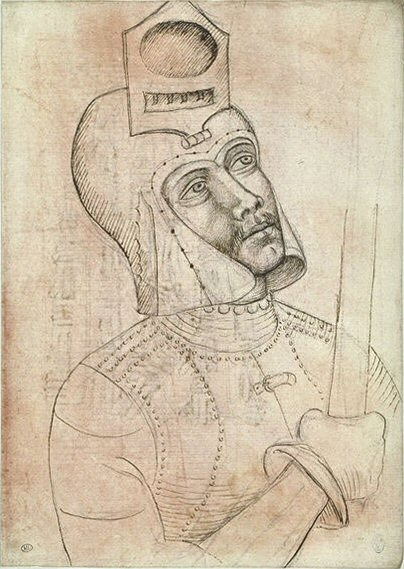
2613 recto

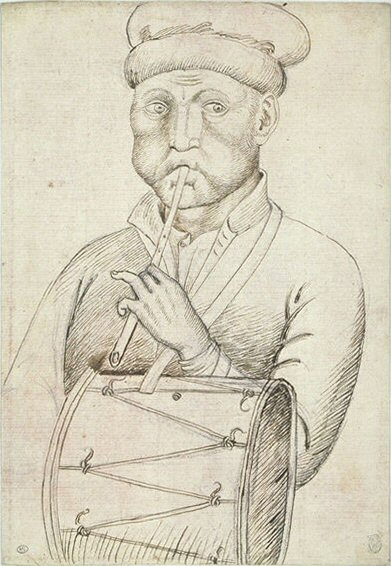
2614

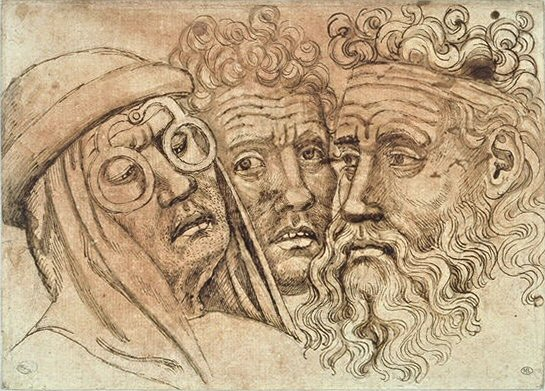
2623 recto

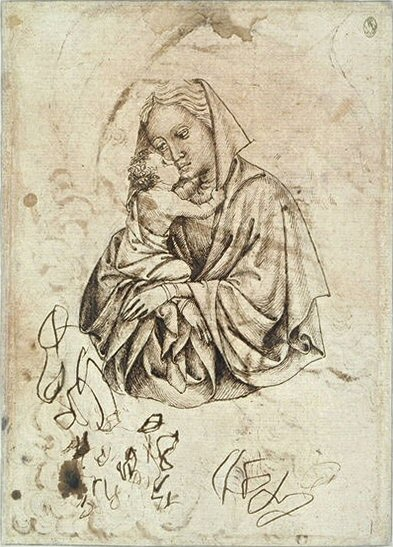
2623 verso

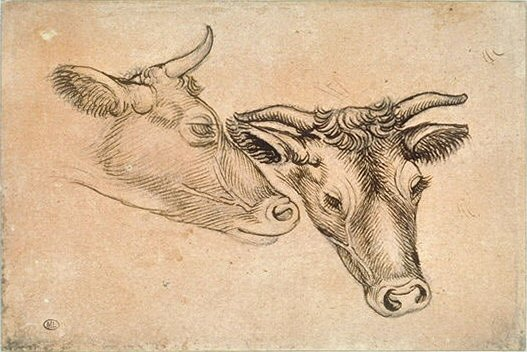
2544

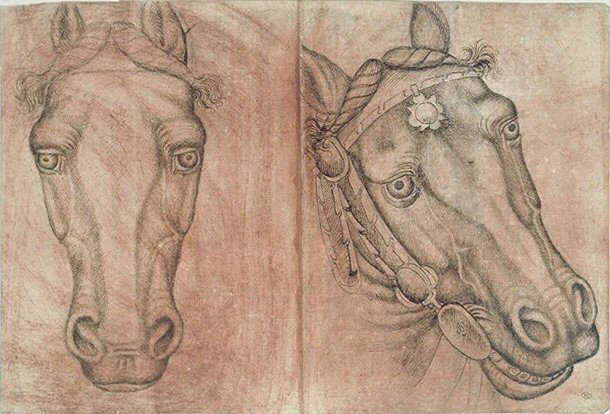
2630 recto

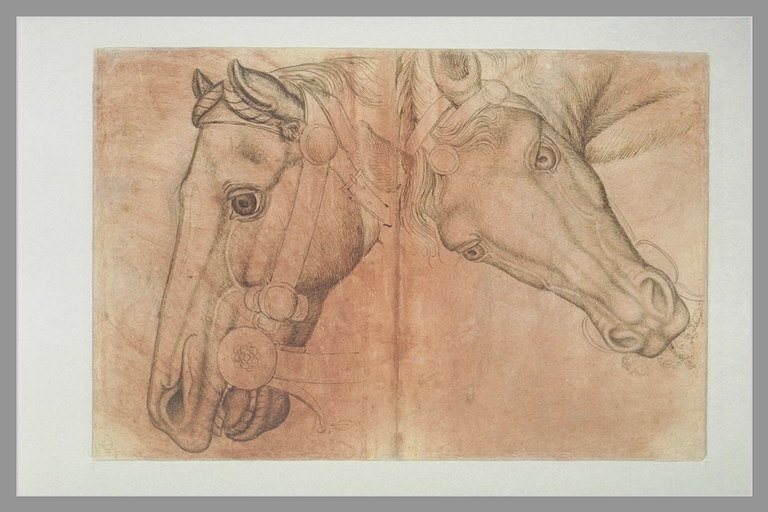
2631

== Literature ==
- Giuseppe Fiocco: Bono da Ferrara. In: Enciclopedia Italiana. Vol. 7: Bil–Bub, Rome 1930.
- Corrado Padovani: La critica d’arte e la pittura ferrarese. Rovigo 1954, S. 119, 145 f, 152 f.
- Roberto Longhi: Officina Ferrarese 1934 Sansoni, Firenze 1956, S. 15 f, 20, 95 footnote, 34–37, 102, 176.
- Ranieri Varese (1970). "Bono da Ferrara". Dizionario Biografico degli Italiani (in Italian). Vol. 12: Bonfadini–Borrello. Rome: Istituto dell'Enciclopedia Italiana. ISBN 978-88-12-00032-6. bono-da-ferrara Dizionario-Biografico.
- Bernhard Degenhart; Annegrit Schmitt (1995). Pisanello und Bono da Ferrara. Munich: Hirmer. ISBN 3-7774-6580-1.
