= Casolani =

Casolani is a surname. Notable people with the surname include:

- Alessandro Casolani (1552–1606), Italian painter
- Annetto Casolani (1815–1866), Maltese Roman Catholic bishop
- Cristoforo Casolani (c. 1552–after 1606), Italian painter
- Ilario Casolani (1588–1661), Italian painter
- Niccolò Casolani (1659–1714), Italian painter

See also

- Casolari
