= Niccolò =

- Niccolò Machiavelli
- Pronunciation: Italian: [nikkoˈlɔ]
- Gender: Male
- Language: Italian

Origin
- Language: Greek
- Meaning: Nicholas
- Region of origin: Italy

Other names
- Alternative spelling: Nicolò
- Variant form: Nicola
- Related names: Nicholas, Nicola, Nicolas, Klaus

Niccolò is an Italian male given name, derived from the Greek Nikolaos meaning "Victor of people" or "People's champion".

There are several male variations of the name: Nicolò, Niccolò, Nicolas, and Nicola. The female equivalent is Nicole. The female diminutive Nicoletta is used although seldom. Rarely, the letter "C" can be followed by a "H" (ex. Nicholas). As the letter "K" is not part of the Italian alphabet, versions where "C" is replaced by "K" are even rarer.

== Given name ==
People with the name include:

=== In literature ===
- Niccolò Ammaniti (born 1966), Italian writer
- Niccolò Machiavelli (1469–1527), Italian political philosopher, musician, poet, and romantic comedic playwright
- Niccolò Massa (1485–1569), Italian anatomist who wrote an early anatomy text Anatomiae Libri Introductorius in 1536

=== In music ===
- Niccolò Castiglioni (1932–1996), Italian composer and pianist
- Niccolò Cervellin (born 2001), know professionally as Soniko, Italian rapper, record producer and disc jockey
- Niccolò da Perugia, 14th-century Italian composer of the trecento
- Niccolò Jommelli (1714–1774), Italian composer
- Niccolò Moriconi (born 1996), know professionally as Ultimo, Italian singer-songwriter
- Niccolò Paganini (1782–1840), Italian violinist, violist, guitarist and composer
- Niccolò Piccinni (1728–1800), Italian composer of classical music and opera
- Niccolò Antonio Zingarelli (1752–1837), Italian composer

=== In Mannerism ===
- Niccolò dell'Abbate (1509/1512–1571), Italian Mannerist painter and decorator
- Niccolò Tribolo (1500–1550), Florentine Mannerist artist in the service of Cosimo I de' Medici

=== In other fields ===
- Niccolò Alamanni (1583–1626), Roman antiquary of Greek origin
- Niccolò Alunno (1430–1502), Italian painter
- Niccolò dell'Arca (1435/1440–1494), Italian sculptor
- Niccolò Cacciatore (1770–1841), Italian astronomer
- Niccolò Canepa (born 1988), Italian motorcycle racer, competing in MotoGP with Ducati, 2007 Superstock 1000 F.I.M. Cup world champion
- Niccolò Casolani (1659–1714), Italian painter
- Niccolò Da Conti (1395–1469), Venetian merchant and explorer
- Niccolò Fieschi (1456–1524), Italian cardinal
- Niccolò Fortebraccio (1375–1435), Italian condottiero (mercenary commander)
- Niccolò Gabburri (1675–1742), Italian diplomat and painter
- Niccolò Gattilusio (died 1462), Italian ruler of Lesbos
- Niccolò Gattilusio, Lord of Ainos (died 1409), Italian ruler of Aenus
- Niccolò Gitto (born 1986), Italian water polo player
- Niccolò di Piero Lamberti (1370–1451), Italian sculptor and architect
- Niccolò Ludovisi (1610–1664), Italian aristocrati
- Niccolò Matas (1798–1872), Italian architect
- Niccolò de' Niccoli (1364–1437), Italian Renaissance humanist
- Niccolò Piccinni (1728–1800), Italian composer
- Niccolò Piccinino (1386–1444), Italian condottiero
- Niccolò Polo (1230–1294), Venetian merchant and explorer, father of Marco Polo.
- Niccolò Fontana Tartaglia (1499/1500–1557), Italian mathematician, engineer, surveyor and bookkeeper
- Niccolò Antonio Zingarelli (1752–1837), Italian composer
- Niccolò II (1338–1388), and Niccolò III d'Este (1383–1441), rulers of Ferrara

=== Fictional characters ===
- Nicholas de Fleury, central character in The House of Niccolò series of books by Dorothy Dunnett
- Niccolò "Nico" di Angelo, main supporting character in Percy Jackson & the Olympians

== See also ==
- Niccolò I (disambiguation)
- Niccolò II (disambiguation)
- Niccolò III (disambiguation)
- Nicolò (disambiguation)
- San Niccolò (disambiguation)
