= Ovetari Chapel =

Fresco paintings from the 15th century

Coordinates: 45°24′37″N 11°52′48″E

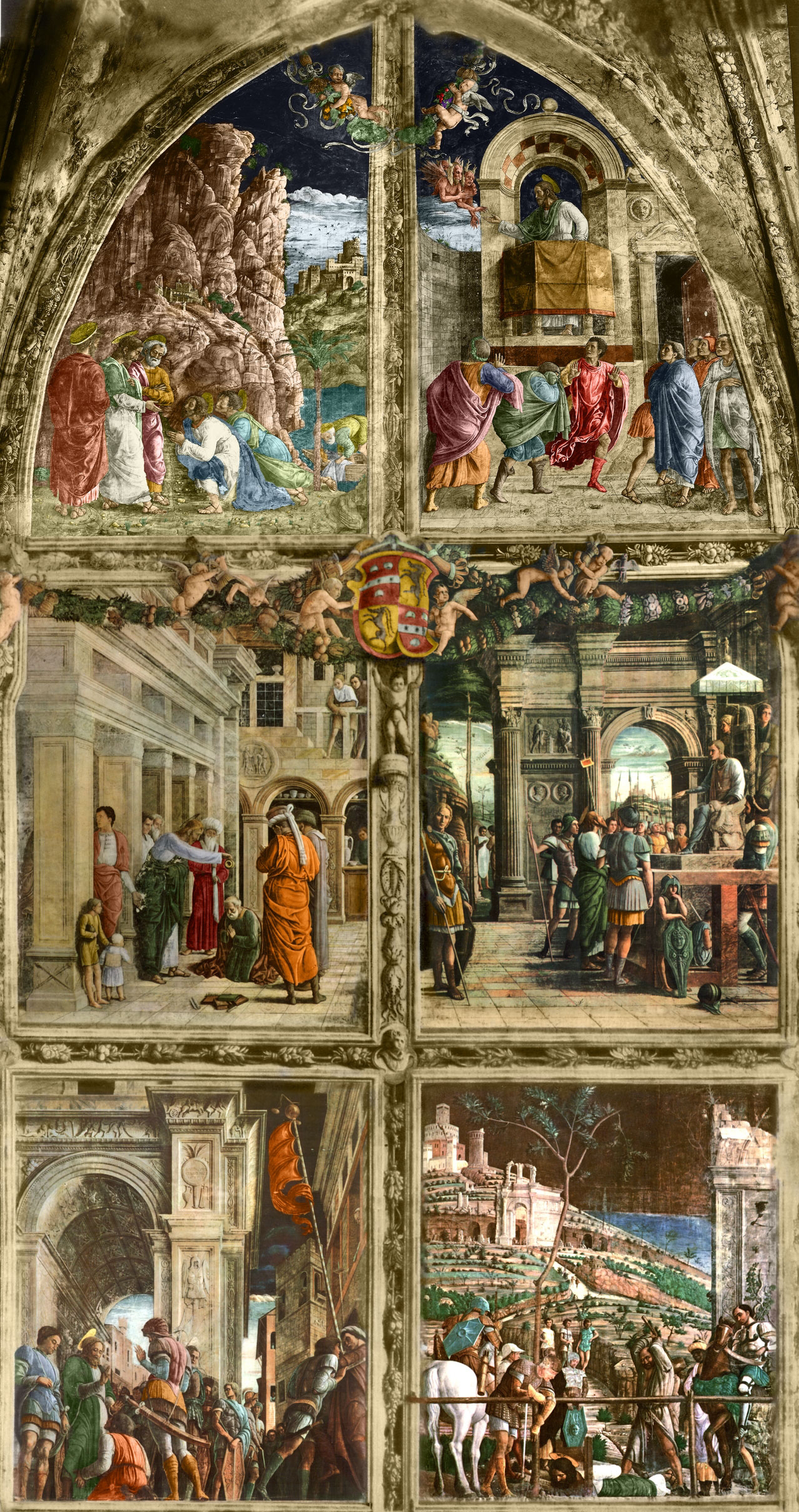
Stories of St. James (reconstruction from coloured black-and-white photos).

The Ovetari Chapel (Italian: Cappella Ovetari) is a chapel in the right arm of the transept of the Church of the Eremitani in Padua. It is renowned for a Renaissance fresco cycle by Andrea Mantegna and others, painted from 1448 to 1457. The cycle was destroyed by an Allied bombing in 1944. Two scenes had been removed in 1880. These and thousands of fragments were used in a partial restoration of the frescoes completed in 2006. They are, however, known from black-and-white photographs.

== History ==
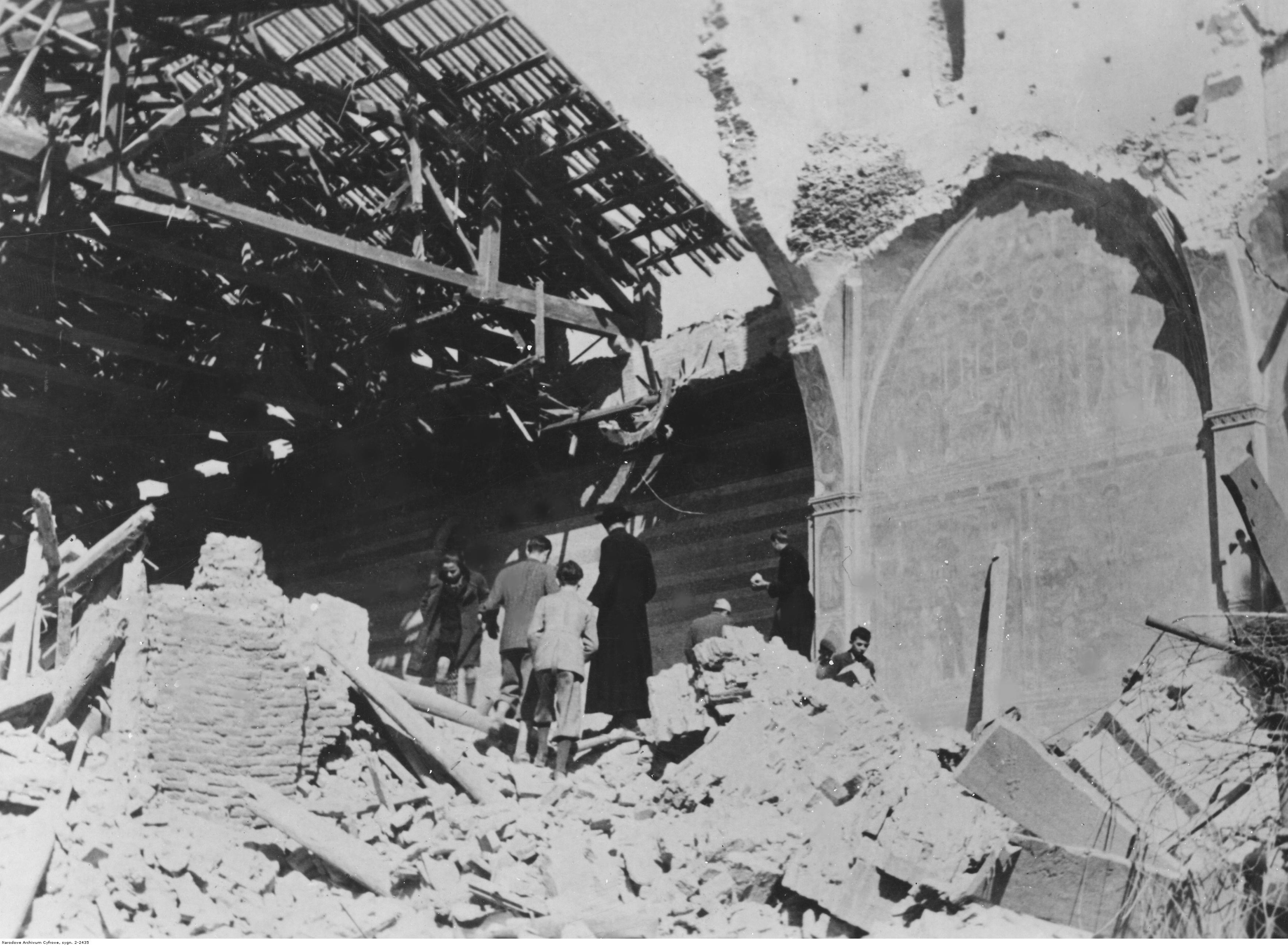
The chapel after the bombing of 11 March 1944

Antonio Ovetari was a Padua notary who, at his death, left a large sum for the decoration of the family chapel in the Church of the Eremitani. The project was carried out in 1448 by his widow, Imperatrice Ovetari, who, commissioned the work to a group of artists that included the elder Giovanni d'Alemagna, Antonio Vivarini (a Venetian late Gothic painter) and two young Paduans, Niccolò Pizzolo and Andrea Mantegna. The latter at the time was seventeen years old and had just begun his apprenticeship in the Squarcione workshop. According to the original agreement, the first two artists had to paint the arch with histories of the Passion of Christ (never executed), the cross vault and the right wall (Histories of St. Chrisopther) while the two Paduans would paint the rest, including the left wall (Histories of St. James, son of Zebedee) and the apse.

In 1449 there were the first personal problems between Mantegna and Pizzolo, the latter accusing the former of continuous interferences in the execution of the altarpiece of the chapel. This led to a redistribution of the works among the artists; perhaps due to this, Mantegna halted his work and visited Ferrara. In 1450 Giovanni, who had executed only the decorative festoons of the vault, died; the following year Vivarini also left the work, after he had completed four Evangelists in the vault. They were replaced by Bono da Ferrara and Ansuino da Forlì, whose style was influenced by that of Piero della Francesca. Mantegna began to work from the apse vault, where he placed three saints, mixed with the Doctors of the Church by Pizzolo. Later Mantegna likely moved to the lunette on the left wall, with the Vocation of Sts. James and John and the Preaching of St. James, completed within 1450, and then moved to the middle sector.

At the end of 1451 the works were halted due to lack of funds. They were restarted in November 1453 and completed in 1457. This second phase saw Mantegna alone at work, as Pizzolo had also died in 1453. Mantegna completed the Stories of St. James, frescoed the central wall with the Assumption of the Virgin and then completed the lower sector of the Stories of St. Cristopher begun by Bono da Ferrara and Ansuino da Forlì, where he painted two unified scenes: the Martyrdom of St. Christopher.

In 1457, Imperatrice Ovetari sued Mantegna. She accused him of having painted only eight apostles instead of twelve in the Assumption. Two painters from Milan, Pietro da Milano and Giovanni Storlato, were called in to solve the matter. They justified Mantegna's choice due to the lack of space.

Around 1880 two scenes, the Assumption and the Martyrdom of St. Christopher, were detached from the walls. During World War II the two frescoes were stored in a separate location and were thus saved from the destruction of all the rest of the cycle during an Allied air bombardment of 11 March 1944. The destroyed scenes had been documented in black-and-white photographs as well as a few copies. For Mantegna's quincentenary commemoration in 2006, the surviving fragments were combined with reconstructions in the original venue.

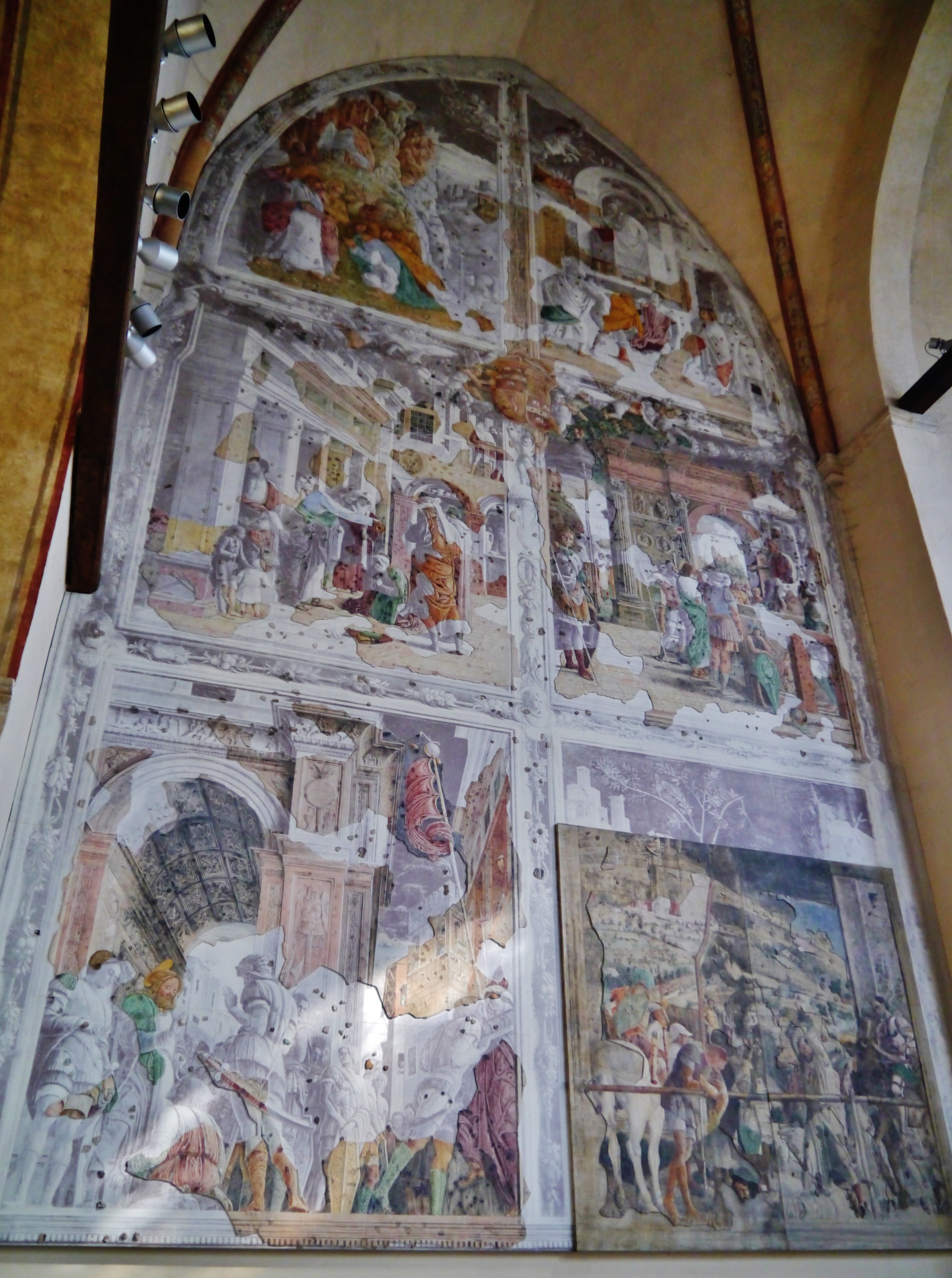
Present reconstruction of Storie di San Giacomo

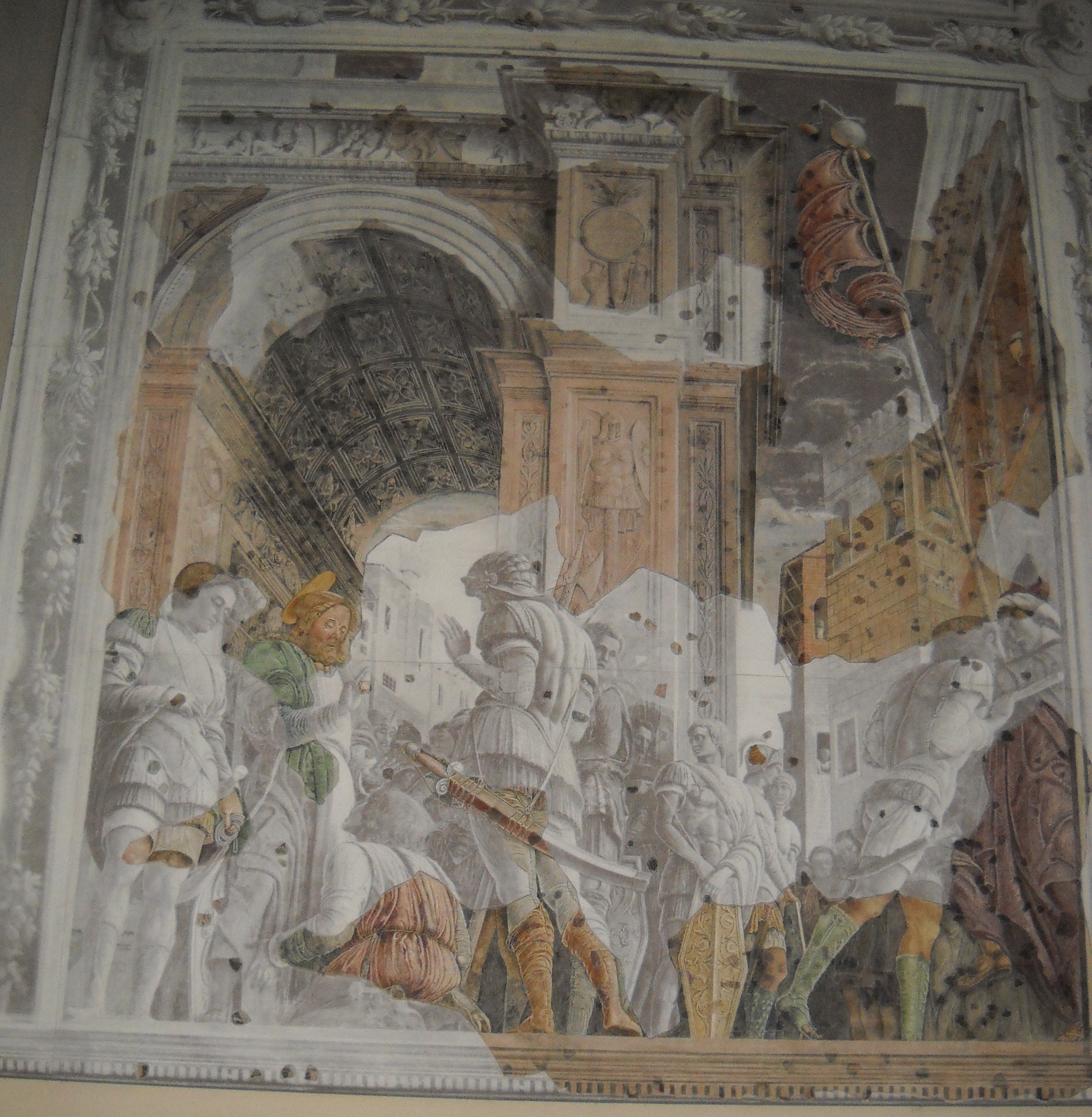
Detail, the Miracolo di San Giacomo

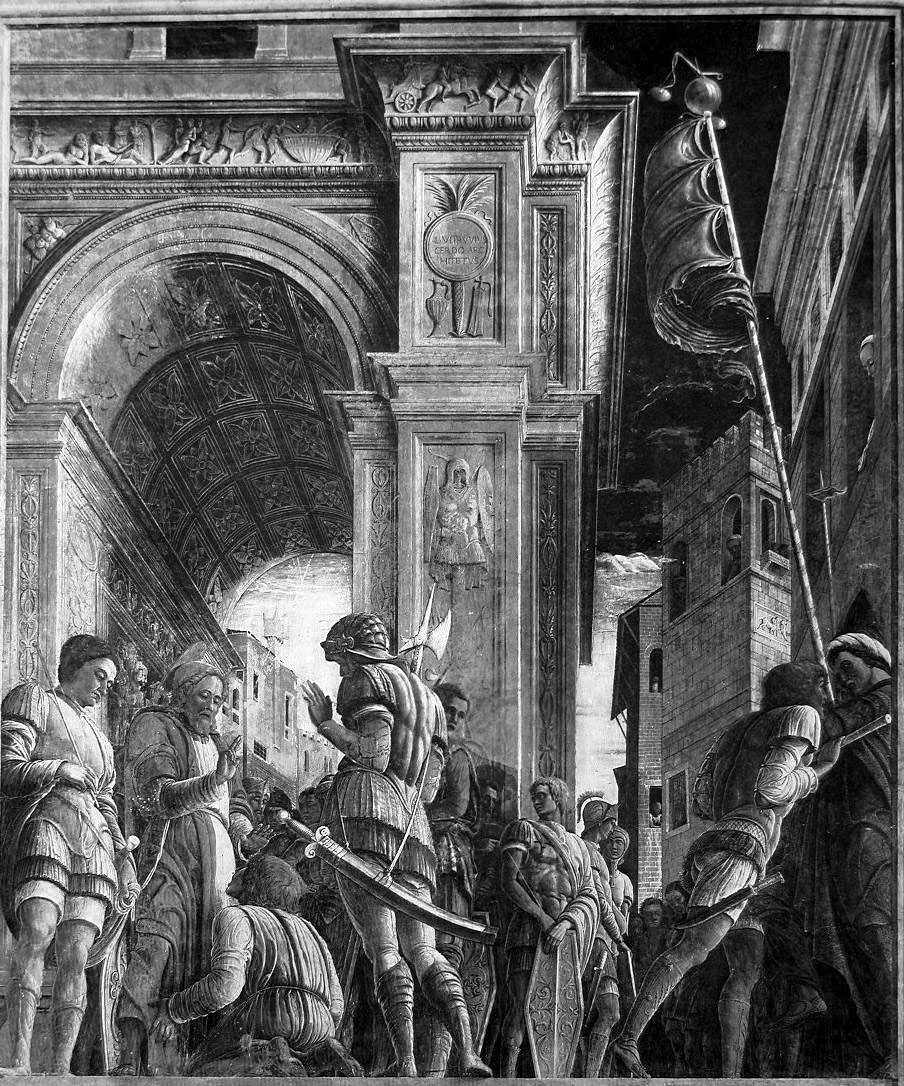
Photo before destruction

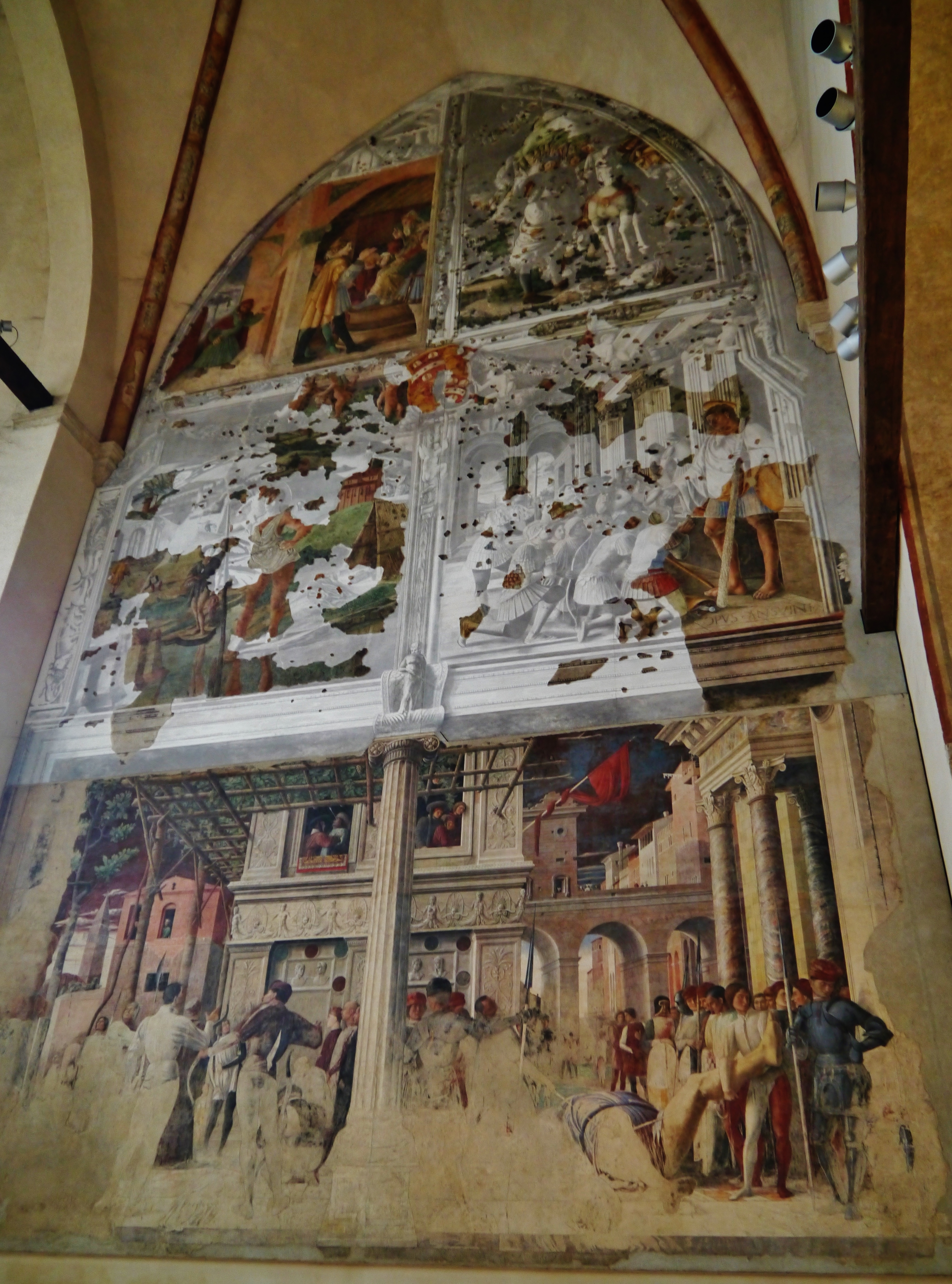
The Storie di San Cristoforo. The bottom scenes had been removed before the bombing.

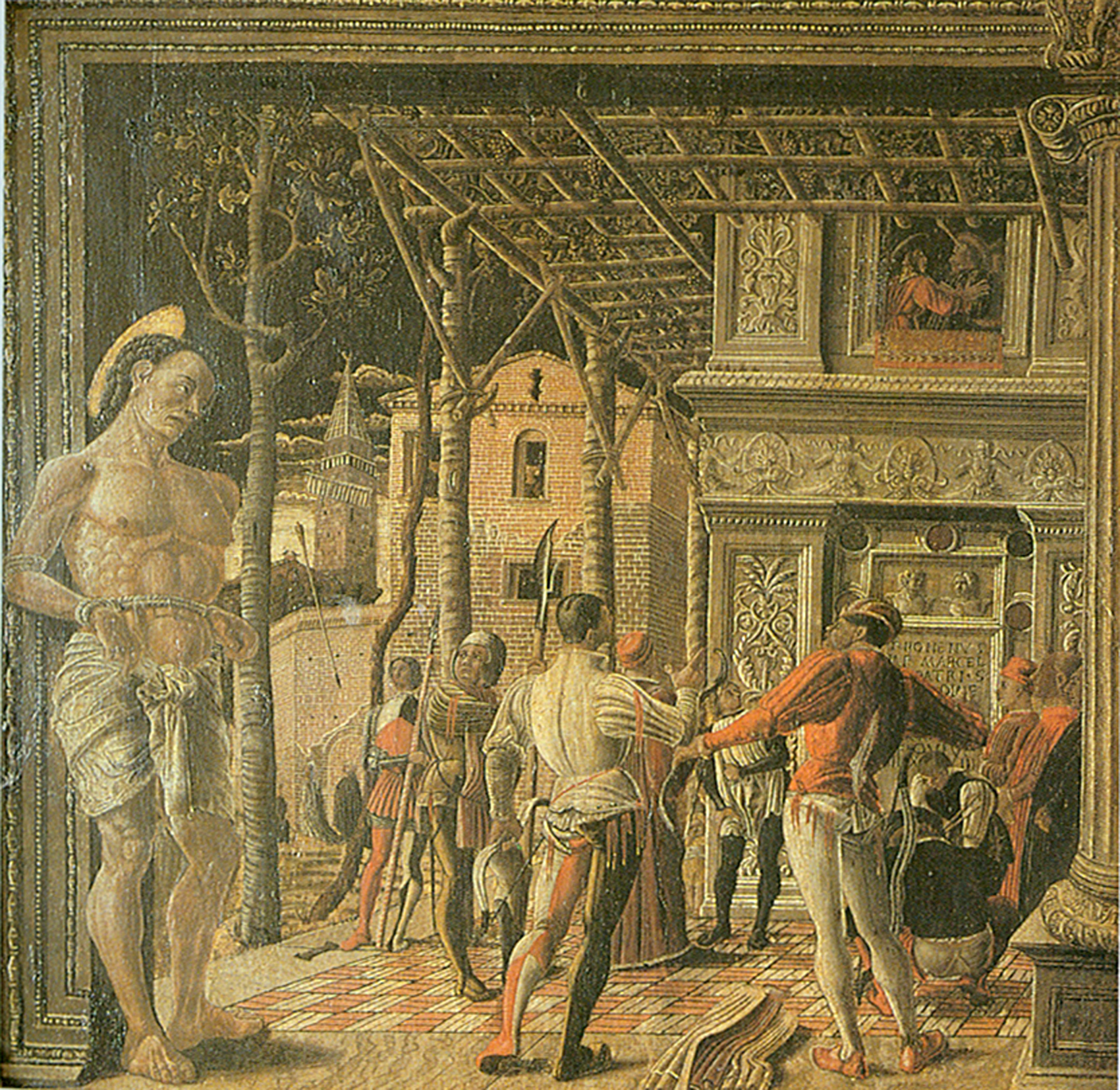
A 15c. copy of the Martyrdom of St Christopher (Musee Jacquemart-Andre, Paris)

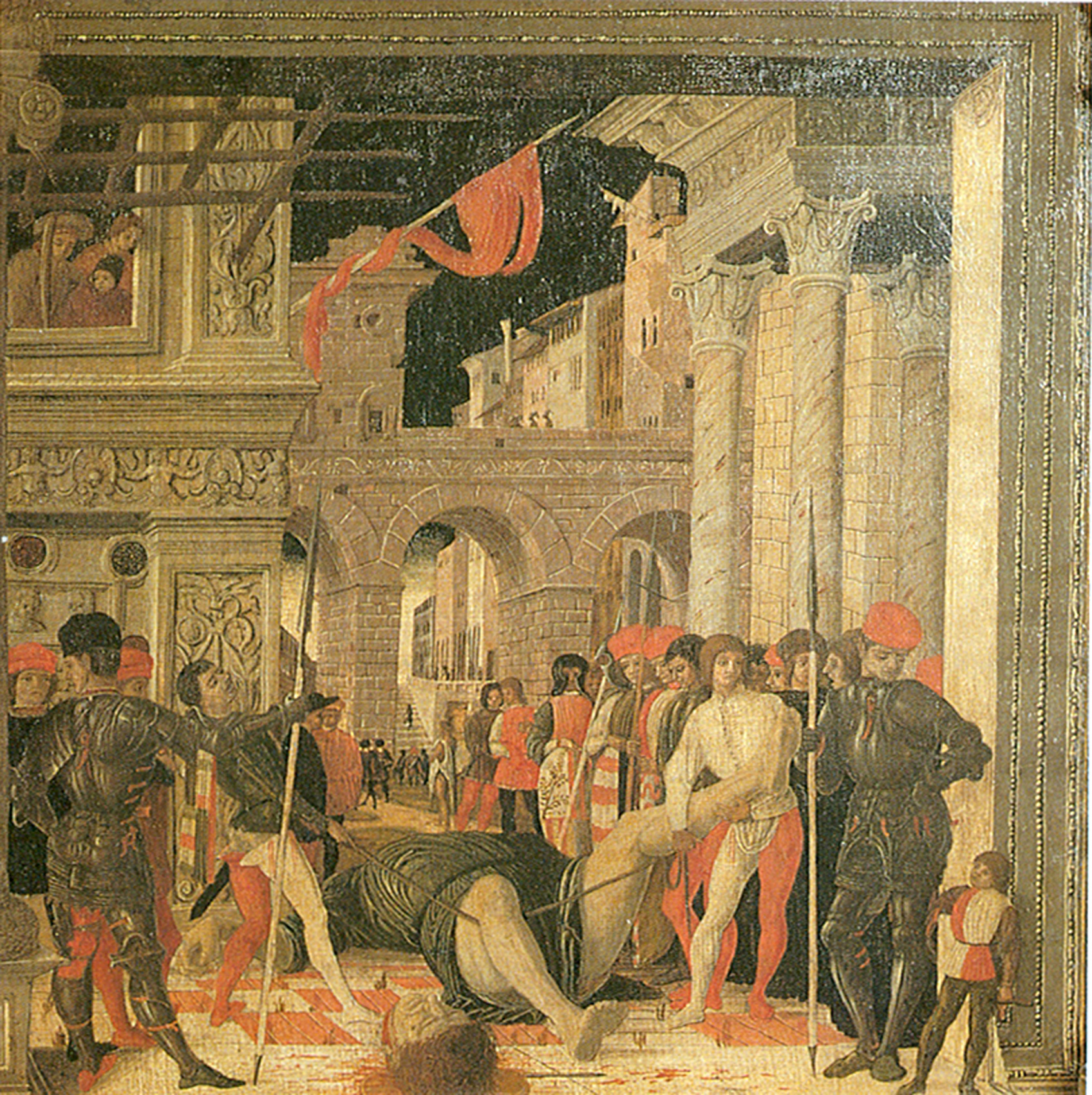
Copy of Transpoting of St Christopher's Body (Musee Jacquemart-Andre)

== Description ==
=== Architecture ===
The Chapel consists of an entrance room with a rectangular base, covered by a cross vault that is connected to a pentagonal apse introduced by an arch, where are a circular opening and four windows that illuminate the chapel.

=== Frescoes ===
The Chapel was dedicated to Saint James and Saint Christopher. The two lateral walls were dedicated to the stories of each saint, with six episodes placed on three sections. The upper one consisted of a round lunette. Despite the presence of several painters in the work, the layout of the cycle is generally attributed to Mantegna, who devised the architectural frames. The stories portrayed were inspired by Jacobus de Voragine's Golden Legend.

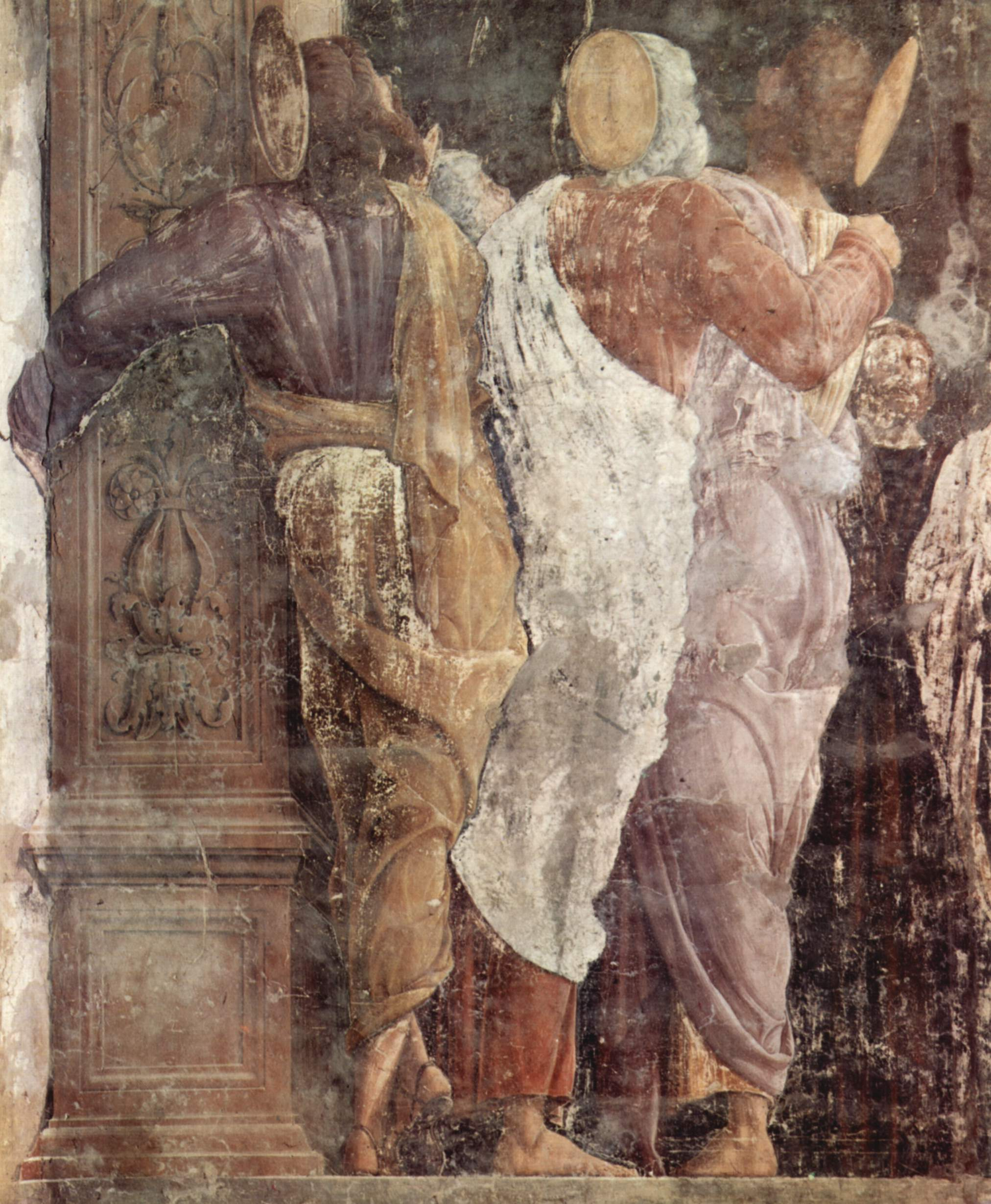
Detail of the Assumption.

The entire northern wall was painted by Mantegna and included:

- Vocation of the Saints James and John
- St. James Preaching
- St. James Baptizes Hermogenes
- Judgement of St. James
- Miracle of St. James
- Martyrdom of St. James

The southern wall included the Stories of St. Christopher:

- St. Christopher Leaving the King by Ansuino da Forlì (attributed)
- St. Christopher and the King of the Devils by Ansuino da Forlì (attributed)
- St. Christopher Ferrying the Child by Bono da Ferrara (signed)
- St. Christopher Preaching by Ansuino da Forlì (signed)
- Martyrdom of St. Christopher by Andrea Mantegna
- Transportation of St. Christopher Beheaded Body by Andrea Mantegna.

On the central wall, where is the window, is a representation of the Assumption of the Virgin by Mantegna. There are also further fragments, likely painted on the piers. The vault was decorated with Four Evangelists by Antonio Vivarini between festoons by Giovanni d'Alemagna, while the apse was divided into sectors, where Mantegna had frescoed the saints Peter, Paul, and Christopher within a stone frame with fruit festoons. These figures show similarities with the frescoes by Andrea del Castagno in the Venetian Church of San Zaccaria (1442), both in the format and their sculptural firmness. Also similar is the cloud on which the figures are standing.

In the remaining spaces were the Eternal Father Blessing and the Doctors of the Church within frames, frescoed by Niccolò Pizzolo. The doctors were majestic figures, the saints being portrayed as Humanist scholars at work in their studios. The arch had two big heads, usually identified as self-portraits by Mantegna and Pizzolo. The decoration of the Chapel was completed by an altarpiece in terracotta covered with bronze by Pizzolo, which, although very damaged, is still existing. It shows a Holy Conversation in bas-relief.
