= San Niccolò =

San Niccolò may refer to:

- San Niccolò Oltrarno, a Roman Catholic church in Florence, Tuscany, Italy
- San Niccolò, Osimo, a Roman Catholic church in Osimo, in the province of Ancona, Marche, Italy
- San Niccolò di Celle, a frazione of Deruta in the province of Perugia, Umbria, Italy
- San Niccolò al Carmine, Siena, a Roman Catholic church and monastery in Tuscany, Italy

== See also ==
- San Nicolò (disambiguation)
- Niccolò (disambiguation)
