= Casolari =

Casolari is a surname. Notable people with the surname include:

- Francesco Casolari (born 1965), Italian baseball player
- Georges Casolari (1941–2012), French footballer
- Nardo Casolari (born 1997), Italian rugby union player

== See also ==
- Casolani
