= San Nicola =

San Nicola, Italian name of Saint Nicholas, may refer to:

== Places of Italy ==
Municipalities

- San Nicola Arcella, in the Province of Cosenza, Calabria
- San Nicola Baronia, in the Province of Avellino, Campania
- San Nicola da Crissa, in the Province of Vibo Valentia, Calabria
- San Nicola dell'Alto, in the Province of Crotone, Calabria
- San Nicola la Strada, in the Province of Caserta, Campania
- San Nicola Manfredi, in the Province of Benevento, Campania
- Sannicola, in the Province of Lecce, Apulia

Hamlets

- San Nicola (island), an island and municipal seat of Isole Tremiti (FG), Apulia
- San Nicola (Albanella), in the municipality of Albanella (SA), Campania
- San Nicola (Centola), in the municipality of Centola (SA), Campania
- San Nicola (Fara Filiorum Petri), in the municipality of Fara Filiorum Petri (CH), Abruzzo
- San Nicola di Melfi, in the municipality of Melfi (PZ), Basilicata

== Architectures ==
- Stadio San Nicola, a stadium in Bari, Italy
- List of St. Nicholas Churches in Italy

== See also ==
- San Nicolás (disambiguation)
- Saint Nicholas (disambiguation)
- San Nicolò (disambiguation)
