= Saint James Led to His Execution =

Destroyed fresco by Andrea Mantegna

Saint James Led to His Martyrdom
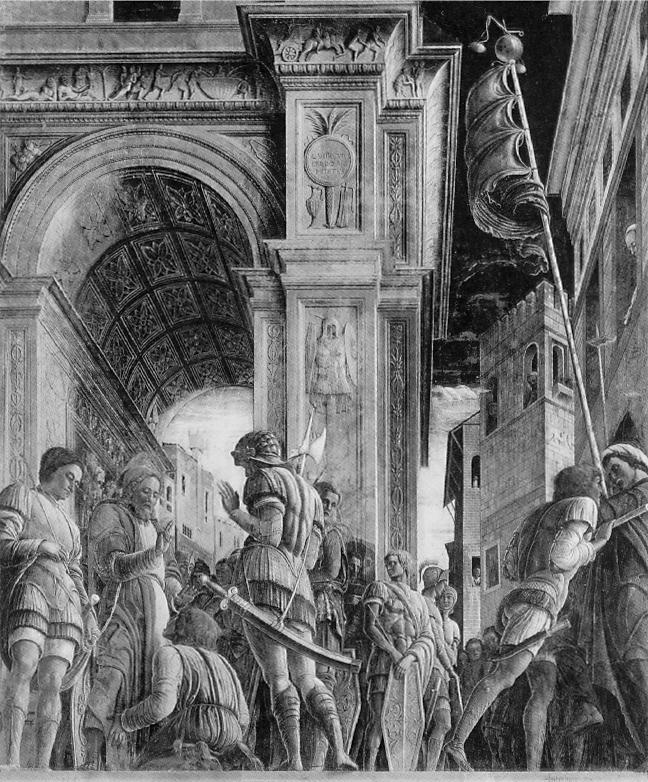
- Artist: Andrea Mantegna
- Year: c. 1453–1455

Saint James Led to His Martyrdom was a scene, part of a fresco, by Andrea Mantegna. The fresco was found in the Ovetari Chapel of the Eremitani Church in Padua. The scene was found on the lowest row on the left wall, painted sometime between 1453 and 1455. It was destroyed on March 11, 1944, when the Ovetari Chapel in Padua was bombed by the Allies during World War II.

The British Museum owns a preparatory drawing for the painting.

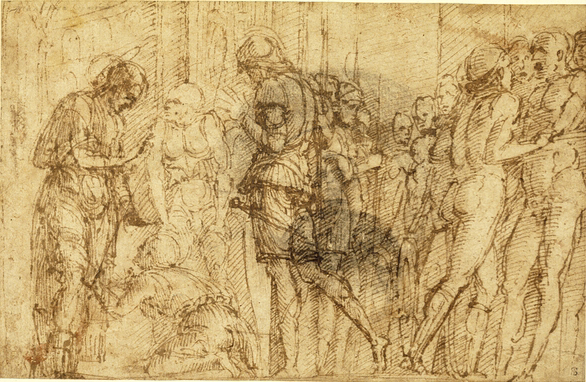
Preparatory drawing for Saint James Led to His Execution
