= Nicolò Navigajoso =

Venetian diplomat and colonial official

Nicolò Navigajoso was a Venetian diplomat and colonial official in the 1260s and 1270s.

In 1265 he was sent as ambassador to the Byzantine capital, Constantinople, along with Pietro Badoerio. In 1268–69 he was castellan of Coron in the Morea, together with Nicolò Miglani, who was likely the junior of the two. He was sent as one of a three-member embassy to Pope Gregory X in 1272, and, again along with Miglani, as ambassador to Serbia (Rascia) in 1275, after the Serbian king Stefan Uroš I had attacked Ragusa.

== Sources ==
- Da Canal, Martino (1845). "La chronique des Veniciens de Maistre Martin Da Canal: Seconde partie". Archivio Storico Italiano (in French and Italian). 8: 448–707. JSTOR 44457011.
- Dandolo, Andrea (1728). "Chronicon". In Muratori, Lodovico Antonio (ed.). Rerum Italicarum Scriptores, Tomus XII. Milan: Ex Typographia Societatis Palatinæ in Regia Curia.
- Morgan, Gareth (1976). "The Venetian Claims Commission of 1278". Byzantinische Zeitschrift. 69 (2): 411–438. doi:10.1515/byzs.1976.69.2.411. S2CID 159571822.
