= Niccolò II =

Niccolò II may refer to:

- Niccolò II Alberti (c. 1250 – 1321)
- Niccolò II Sanudo (died aft. 1374)
- Niccolò II d'Este, Marquis of Ferrara (1338–1388)
- Niccolò II Ludovisi (1699–1700)

== See also ==
- Nicholas II (disambiguation)
- Niccolò (name)
