= Nicolò Miglani =

Venetian diplomat and politician

Nicolò Miglani was a Venetian diplomat and colonial official in the 1260s and 1270s.

In 1268–69 he was castellan of Coron in the Morea, together with Nicolò Navigajoso, who was likely the senior of the two. He went on to serve as Bailo of Negroponte in 1271–72, and then was sent as Venetian envoy to Serbia (Rascia) in 1275 along with Navigajoso, after the Serbian king Stefan Uroš I had attacked Ragusa.

== Sources ==
- Da Canal, Martino (1845). "La chronique des Veniciens de Maistre Martin Da Canal: Seconde partie". Archivio Storico Italiano (in French and Italian). 8: 448–707. JSTOR 44457011.
- Dandolo, Andrea (1728). "Chronicon". In Muratori, Lodovico Antonio (ed.). Rerum Italicarum Scriptores, Tomus XII. Milan: Ex Typographia Societatis Palatinæ in Regia Curia.
- Morgan, Gareth (1976). "The Venetian Claims Commission of 1278". Byzantinische Zeitschrift. 69 (2): 411–438. doi:10.1515/byzs.1976.69.2.411. S2CID 159571822.
