= San Nicolò =

San Nicolò may refer to:

- San Nicolò a Tordino, frazione in the Province of Teramo in the Abruzzo region of Italy
- San Nicolò dei Mendicoli, church, which is located in the sestiere of Dorsoduro in Venice
- San Nicolò l'Arena, Catania, title of both the Roman Catholic church and its adjacent and enormous Benedictine monastery
- San Nicolò, Montecastrilli, Roman Catholic church located in the town of Montecastrilli, in the province of Terni, region of Umbria, Italy
- San Nicolò, Isola Dovarese, Neoclassical-style, Roman Catholic church located on in the town of Isola Dovarese in the province of Cremona, region of Lombardy, Italy
- San Nicolo, Cagli, Roman Catholic, Franciscan church in Cagli, province of Pesaro e Urbino, region of Marche, Italy
- San Nicolò, Padua, Romanesque and Gothic-style, Roman Catholic church in Padua, region of Veneto, Italy
- San Nicolò Gerrei, municipality in the Province of South Sardinia in the Italian region Sardinia, Italy

== See also ==
- San Nicola (disambiguation)
- Nicolò (disambiguation)
- San Niccolò (disambiguation)
