= Nicolò Pizzolo =

Italian painter (c. 1420–after 1453)

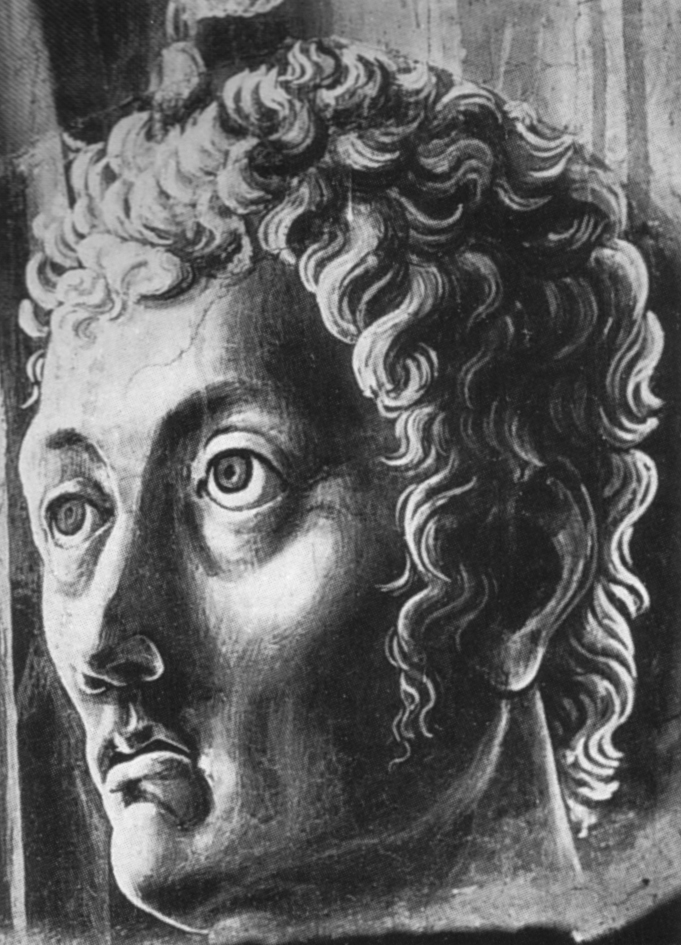
Putative self-portrait in Cappella Ovetari in Padua

Nicolò Pizzolo (circa 1420 – after 1453), also known as Nicolò di Pietro di Giovanni or with surname spelled Pizolo, was an Italian painter from Padua.

== Biography ==
He initially worked with Ansuino da Forlì and Filippo Lippi to paint frescoes in the Chapel of the Podestà in Padua. He appears to have worked with Donatello.

He trained and worked under Francesco Squarcione alongside Andrea Mantegna. He painted an Assumption of Mary for the church of the Eremitani, Padua.
