= Nicolo Dorigati =

Italian painter (fl. 1689-1736)

Nicolò or Nicolo Dorigati was an Italian painter, active between 1689 - 1736 in and around Trento, Italy.

== Biography ==
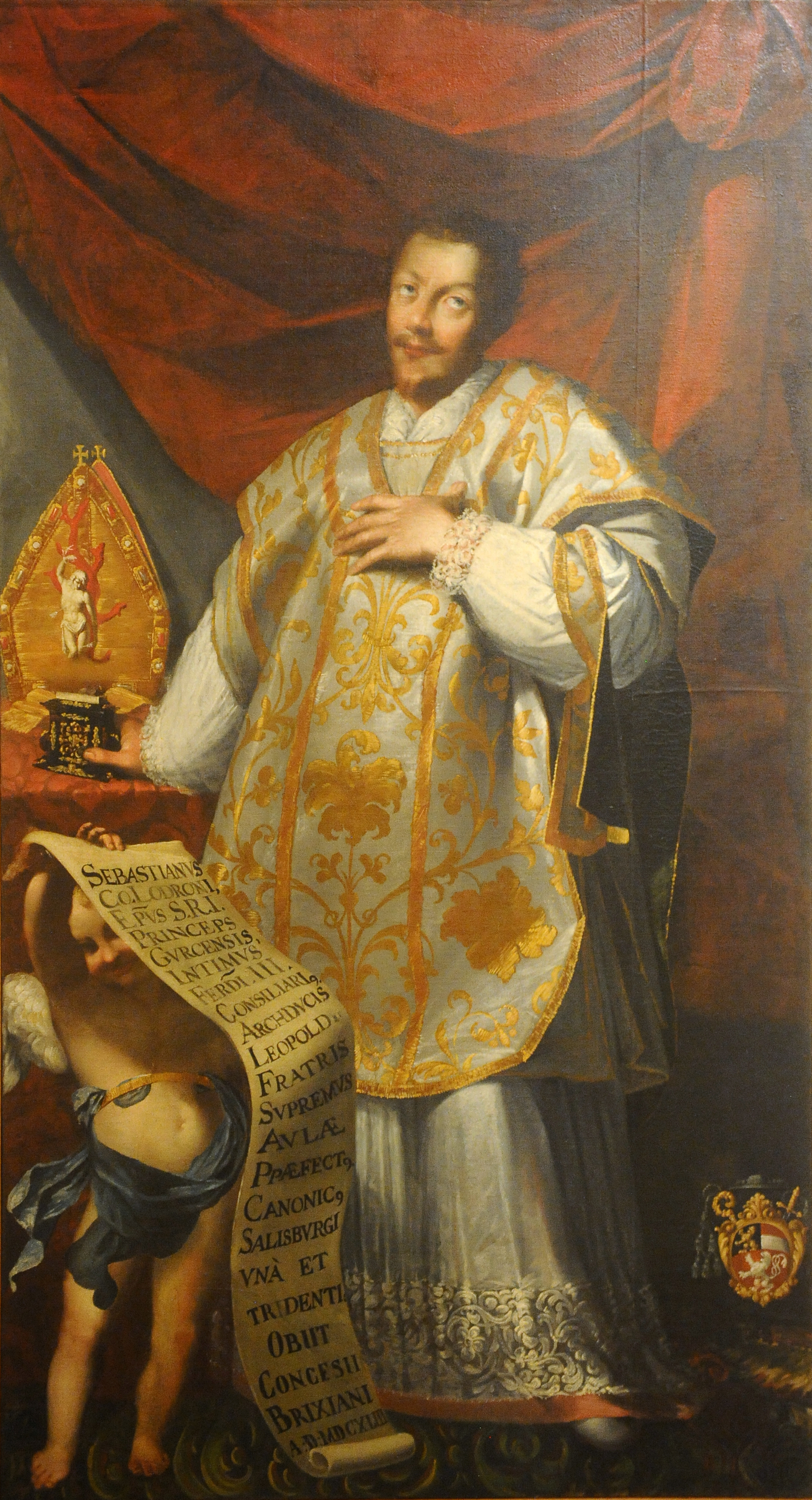
Portrait of Sebastiano Lodron, Tridentine Diocesan Museum, branch of Villa Lagarina

Many of his biographical details are not recorded. He was either trained by or a disciple of the Bolognese Carlo Cignani. Among his works are a Madonna Addolorata, once found in the Cathedral of Trento, the Gonfaloncini of the Mysteries of the same church, the painting of St. Catherine of Bologna held in the Reformed Fathers of Trent in San Bernardino, and that of Maria and San Felice, once found in the church of the Capuchin Fathers in the same city. Other works are a St John of Sahagún saves a child fallen in a well now in the church of Terres, but originally in the Augustinian church of San Marco in Trento (1696-1700). He painted an altarpiece commissioned by it:Carlo Ferdinando Lodron for the Cathedral, and they also commissioned portraits of priest from the family for the Sacristy of the Pieve of Villa Lagarina. He also painted a St Valentine (before 1708) for the church of Dasindo(before 1708) and a Madonna and patron saints of Trento.
