= Nicolò Crasso =

Italian writer and politician (1585–1656)

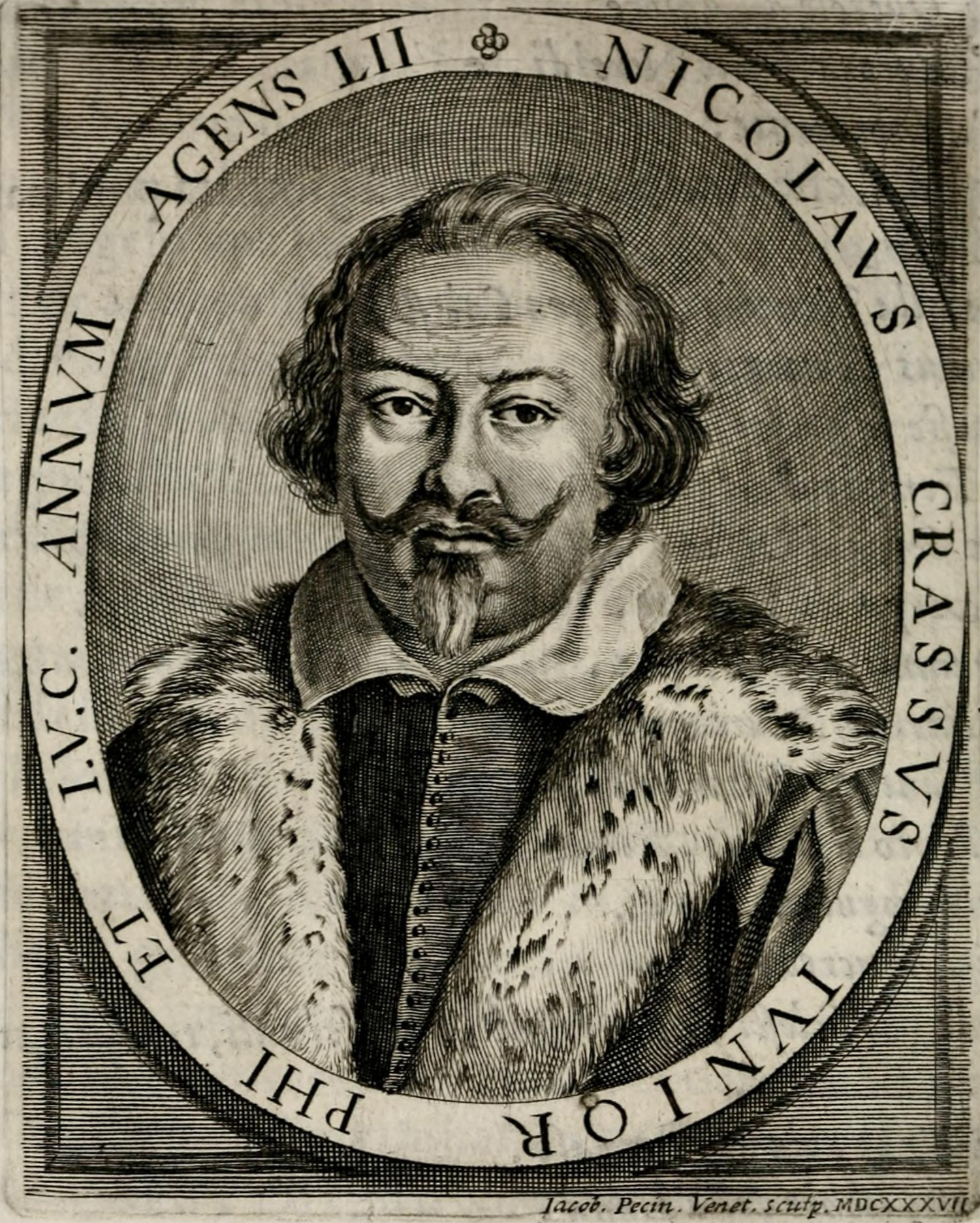
- Portrait of Nicolò Crasso from the book "Le glorie degli Incogniti", 1647
- Born: 1585; Venice, Republic of Venice
- Died: 30 September 1656 (aged 70–71); Venice, Republic of Venice
- Resting place: San Sebastiano, Venice
- Education: University of Padua
- Occupations: Poet; Politician; Intellectual; Jurist
- Spouse: Laura Zuccaredda (m. 1607)
- Children: 2
- Parent(s): Marco Crasso and Triffona Crasso (née di Dominici)
- Writing career
- Pen name: Publio Licinio; Liberius Vincentius Hollandus
- Language: Latin; Italian
- Period: 17th century; Baroque
- Genres: Poetry; pamphlet; treatise
- Movements: Marinism; Baroque

Nicolò Crasso (1585 – 30 September 1656) was an Italian nobleman, politician, jurist and writer.

== Biography ==
Nicolò Crasso was born in Venice in 1585. He was the son of Marco Crasso and Triffona di Dominici. He was baptized in Venice in the church of S. Maria del Giglio on 6 July 1585. He studied at the University of Padua and completed a law degree in 1602. He actively participated in the city's cultural life and was admitted to the Accademia dei Ricovrati, which counted Galileo Galilei among its members.

Crasso returned to Venice in 1606. During the Interdict conflict he gave proof of his abilities in publications supporting the Serenissima in her dispute with the papacy. In 1606 he published anonymously his Antiparaenesis ad Cesarem Baronium, a biting reply to an anti-Venetian tract by Cardinal Caesar Baronius. In 1607 Crasso married Laura Zuccaredda, by whom he had two children, Alvise and Lucrezia.

Shortly afterwards he was appointed to the post of a avvocato fiscale, an official attached to the three Inquisitors of the Levant, whose job was to investigate the functioning of the overseas Venetian courts and administrations. He spent some time in various Venetian territories, including the islands of Cephalonia, Zakynthos and Corfu, where he acquired many valuable artefacts for his collection of antiquities. After returning from Greece, Crasso appears to have spent most or all of his remaining years in Venice and her environs, where he practised his profession as a lawyer. He died in Venice on 30 September 1656. Crasso was buried in the family tomb built in 1563 by his grandfather Nicolò in the church of San Sebastiano. He was a member of several Academies, including the Incogniti, who published a brief account of him, with a portrait, in their book Le glorie de gli Incogniti in 1647.

== Works ==
Crasso was an erudite and prolific author. In 1611 he published in Parma Dell'amoroso trofeo di Publio Licinio, a poetry collection in two parts. The work is composed of a series of love poems addressed to a woman named Tina. In the same year he published in Parma Il simulacro della bellezza, composed of a series of love madrigals. A follower of Marino, Crasso is inspired by a sensual melodic vein which makes his verses feel sincere and passionate. In 1612, he published in Venice, the Elogia patritiorum Venetorum. The work, dedicated to Doge Leonardo Donato, is set forth in four deche, each subdivided into ten short eulogies written in the elegant Latin of which he was a master. The four deche, each dedicated to one of the most prominent personalities in Venice at the time, Leonardo Mocenigo, Nicolò Contarini, Filippo Pasqualigo and Giorgio Corner, celebrate the political deeds of forty Venetian patricians, briefly tracing the main events of their life.

In 1619 Crasso published De iurisdictione sereniss. Reip. Venetae in mare Adriaticum epistola, a harsh pamphlet written in a crude and uncultivate style advocating Venice's (disputed) jurisdiction over the waters of the Adriatic. The real author of the work was Paolo Sarpi; Crasso translated it in Latin. The following year Crasso published in Amsterdam the Menippean satire Nescimus quid vesper serus vehat, written under the pseudonym Liberius Vincentius Hollandus.

Crasso's most extensive and important work is the commentary on the writings of Donato Giannotti and Gasparo Contarini on the Republic of Venice, which appeared under the title of Notae in Donatum Ianotium et Casparem Contarenum cardinalem de Republica Veneta, Lugduni Batavorum, Elzevir, 1631, subsequently reprinted in 1642 and in 1653. The work is dedicated to Domenico Molino, one of the most prestigious and powerful senators of Venice. Molino probably had a part in the drafting of the notes.

In 1621 Crasso published in Venice Andreae Mauroceni Veneti senatoris prestantiss. vita a Latin biography of Andrea Morosini. In the following years Crasso wrote many poems in praise of Venetian patricians. In 1623 he published the pastoral drama in five acts Elpidio consolato. The play was performed in Venice during the carnival season of 1623 and was very successful. Various writings by Crasso have survived unpublished, in manuscript. His brief treatise De forma Reipublicae Venetae liber singularis, written in an elegant Latin style, was published in the fifth volume of Burman's Thesaurus antiquitatum Italiae.

== Bibliography ==
- «Nicolò Crasso Venetiano». In : Le glorie de gli Incogniti: o vero, Gli huomini illustri dell'Accademia de' signori Incogniti di Venetia, In Venetia : appresso Francesco Valuasense stampator dell'Accademia, 1647, pp. 340–343 (on-line).
- Povolo, Claudio (1984). "CRASSO, Nicolò". Dizionario Biografico degli Italiani (in Italian). Vol. 30: Cosattini–Crispolto. Rome: Istituto dell'Enciclopedia Italiana. ISBN 978-88-12-00032-6.
- Vincent, Alfred L. (1996). "Fishing at Mirabello: Nicolò Crasso's "Elpidio consolato" and its Cretan Background". Θησαυρίσματα - Thesaurismata. 26: 280–298.
