= Riccardo Collodel =

Italian footballer

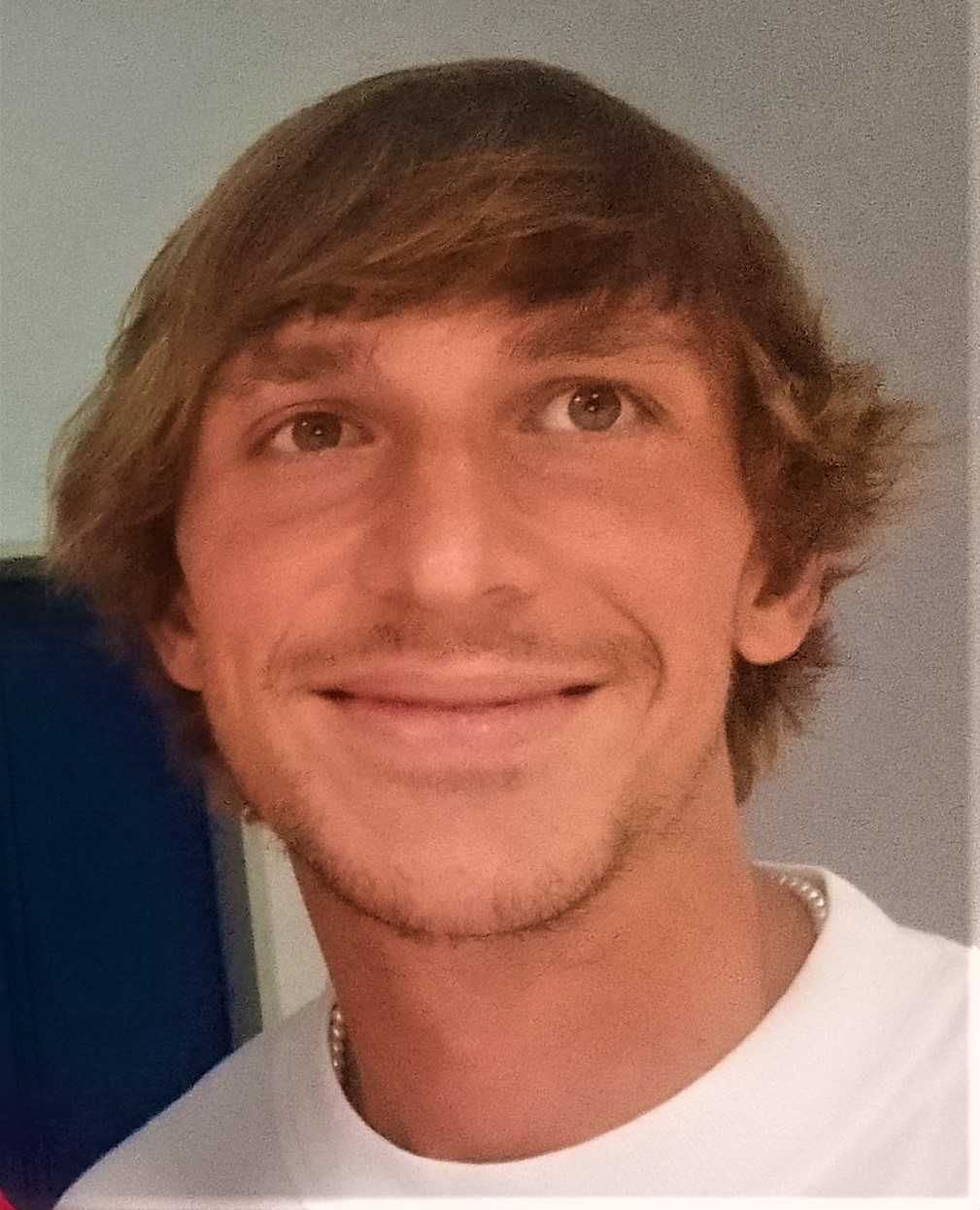

Personal information
- Date of birth: 10 November 1998 (age 28)
- Place of birth: Borgomanero, Italy
- Height: 1.81 m (5 ft 11 in)
- Position: Midfielder

Team information
- Current team: Novara
- Number: 19

Youth career
- –2017: Novara

Senior career*
Years	Team	Apps	(Gls)
2017–2021	Novara	58	(5)
2017–2018	→ Fiorenzuola (loan)	36	(2)
2018–2019	→ Vibonese (loan)	32	(2)
2021–2022	Cremonese	0	(0)
2022	→ Lucchese (loan)	18	(4)
2022–2023	Siena	27	(1)
2023–2024	SPAL	29	(1)
2024–2025	Casertana	32	(0)
2025–	Novara	28	(2)
- * Club domestic league appearances and goals as of 30 April 2026

Riccardo Collodel (born 10 November 1998) is an Italian professional footballer who plays as a midfielder for Serie C Group A club Novara.

== Club career ==
Born in Borgomanero, Collodel started his career in Novara youth sector. For the 2017–18 season, he was loaned to Serie D club Fiorenzuola. Collodel played 36 Serie D matches.

On 23 August 2018, he was loaned again to Serie C club Vibonese. The player made his professional debut on 16 September 2018 against Bisceglie. He returned to Novara the next season, and played two years for the club.

On 10 July 2021, he signed with Serie B club Cremonese.

On 21 January 2022, he was loaned to Serie C club Lucchese.

On 22 July 2022, Collodel joined Siena.

On 16 August 2023, Collodel signed a one-year contract with SPAL.

On 28 August 2024, Collodel moved to Casertana on a three-year contract.
