= Martino da Canal =

Italian writer and historian

Martino da Canal was a 13th-century Venetian chronicler, whose only known work is the so-called Les estoires de Venise, a French chronicle of the history of Venice from its beginnings to 1275. It is particularly valuable for Canal's depiction of events during his own lifetime, particularly during the years 1267–1275, when he was at Venice.

== Biography ==
Martino da Canal is not mentioned in any other source, and the only biographical information about him is what can be extracted from his work. His date of birth and early life are entirely unknown. He was obviously familiar with Venice and its history, and certainly resided in the city itself between 1267 and 1275, when he composed his chronicle, as his account of these years is obviously that of an eyewitness. It is possible that he was a minor public official, perhaps a scribe, on some Venetian board or magistrature, with the Tavola da Mar, a sort of maritime customs, the most likely candidate. He may have had some close relationship with the Doge Reniero Zeno, to whom an extensive portion of his work is dedicated, including events before his election to the dogate. The chronicle ends on September 1275, which is also the last date attested for his life.

== Chronicle ==
His sole known work was a chronicle of the Republic of Venice, from the city's foundation to 1275. Written in French, Canal titled it Cronique des Veniciens ("Chronicle of the Venetians"), but it is more commonly known under the title Les estoires de Venise. The work is divided into two parts of more or less equal length, each with its own prologue. The first part of the work was written in 1267–1268, and was stopped after recounting the downfall of the Romano family in 1259, possibly due to the death of Zeno. The second part of the work is more disjoined, and include two sections dedicated to the festivals of Venice and the parade in honour of Zeno's successor, Lorenzo Tiepolo.

As his work is skewed towards events contemporary with his own life, Canal is certainly not a disinterested observer of remote events, but a partisan with a very clear, patriotic viewpoint. He defends the actions of the Venetians during and after the Fourth Crusade, trying to dispel the accusation that they had diverted it to Constantinople for their own benefit. Domestically he appears a champion of order and the state's institutions, and supports the reconciliation of classes, particularly in the aftermath of the adverse impact on the Venetian economy of the reconquest of Constantinople by the Byzantines in 1261.

Canal reused older sources for the early potions of his chronicle, but these are difficult to identify. He did include several original documents, however, such as the Partitio Romaniae of 1204 and a 1125 charter by Baldwin II of Jerusalem. His particular value lies in the events he himself witnessed, starting with the dogate of Jacopo Tiepolo. The chronicle was known and relied on by the author of the unpublished early 14th-century chronicle of Marco, as well as by the Doge and chronicler Andrea Dandolo, who used it rather selectively in his compilation of Venetian history. There is also some evidence that the 18th-century writer Giustiniana Wynne knew of the work, but otherwise it appears to have been buried in the commercial archives and not discovered again until the 19th century, when L. F. Polidori published its first edition in 1845. Its modern editions are by Alberto Limentani, Les Estoires de Venise: Cronaca veneziana in lingua francese dalle origini al 1275 (Florence 1972), and an English translation by Laura K. Morreale, Martin da Canal, Les Estoires de Venise (Padova, 2009).

== Sources ==
- Text La cronaca dei veneziani del maestro Martino Da Canale nell' antico Francese, in medieval French plus translation to modern Italian (translation by Giovanni Galvani), curated by F. Polidori, publication year 1845, text starts at page 268, in volume VIII of the series Archivio Storico Italiano.
- Limentani, Alberto (1974). "CANAL, Martino". Dizionario Biografico degli Italiani (in Italian). Vol. 17: Calvart–Canefri. Rome: Istituto dell'Enciclopedia Italiana. ISBN 978-88-12-00032-6.
- English translation by Laura Morreale 2009 (Unipress, Padova).
