= Church of the Eremitani =

13th-century church in Padua, Veneto, Italy

Coordinates: 45°24′38″N 11°52′47″E

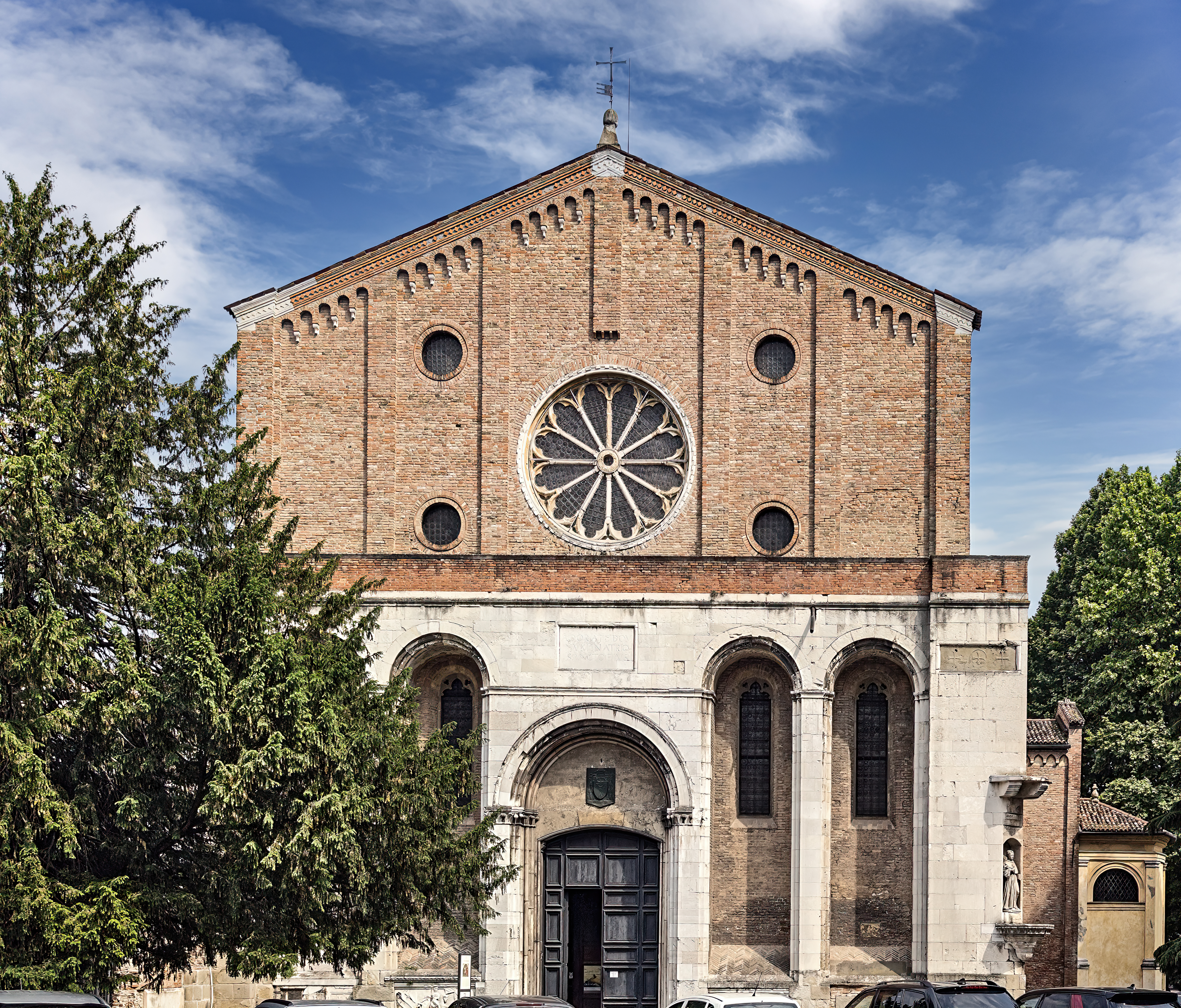
Façade of the church

The Church of the Eremitani (Italian: Chiesa degli Eremitani), or Church of the Hermits, is a former-Augustinian, 13th-century Gothic-style church in Padua, region of the Veneto, Italy. It is also now notable for being adjacent to the Cappella Scrovegni with Giotto frescoes and the municipal archeology and art gallery: the Musei Civici agli Eremitani, which is housed in the former Augustinian monastery located to the left of the entrance. It is part of the UNESCO World Heritage Site of Padua's 14th-century fresco cycles (since 2021).

== History ==
The Augustinian hermit friars, precursors of the present Order of Saint Augustine had arrived in Padua in 1237. Through the patronage of both the wife of the local nobleman Zaccaria dell'Arena and the city, the church was erected between 1260 and 1276 and dedicated to the saints Philip and James. The friars would remain in the administration of the monastery and church until 1806, when the Napoleonic régime suppressed the order and closed the monastery. The church was re-opened to services in 1808, and in 1817 redesignated a parish church.

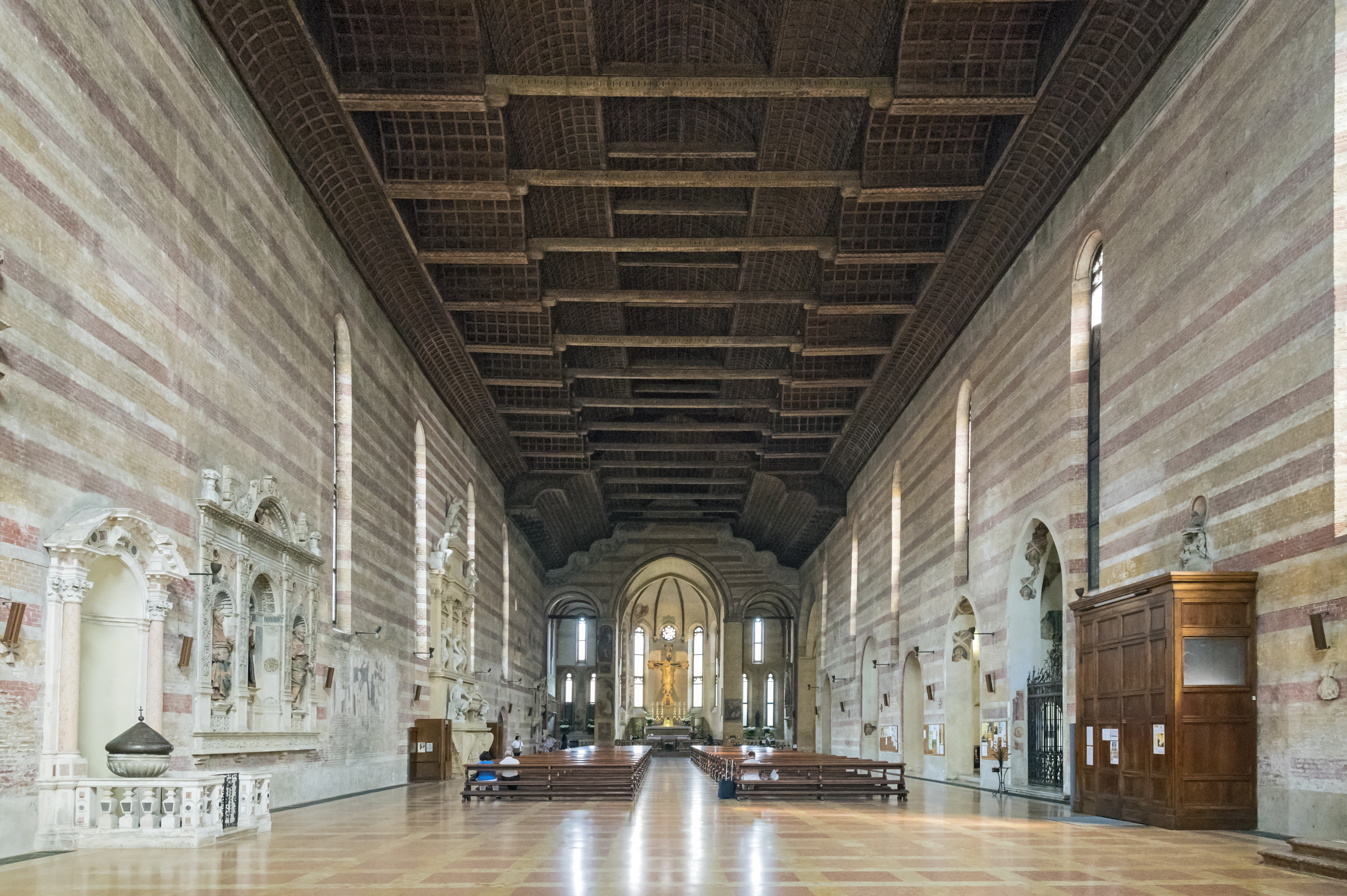
The nave

The façade is tall with a rose window. A 15th-century side portal has bas-reliefs depicting the months, completed by Nicolò Baroncelli. The interior has a single nave.

The ceiling of the church is coffered and wooden. Because of the Venetian mastery of shipbuilding, it is built like an overturned ship's hull.

The church no longer houses the famed Ovetari Chapel frescoes, depicting scenes from the lives of Saints James and Christopher, painted 1448-1457 by the Renaissance painter Mantegna. The chapel was largely destroyed by a March 1944 aerial bombardment by the Allies in World War II, because it was located next to a German headquarters. There are more than 88,000 fragments covering only 77 square metres, while the original area covered several hundreds.

The church still preserves frescoes from other painters including Guariento and Ansuino da Forlì. The church contains the tombs of Jacopo II da Carrara (d.1351) and Ubertino da Carrara (d.1345), lords of Padua, both by Andriolo de Santi (de Sanctis) and others. They were formerly in the church of Sant'Agostino, but were moved here after that church was razed in 1819.

== Gallery ==
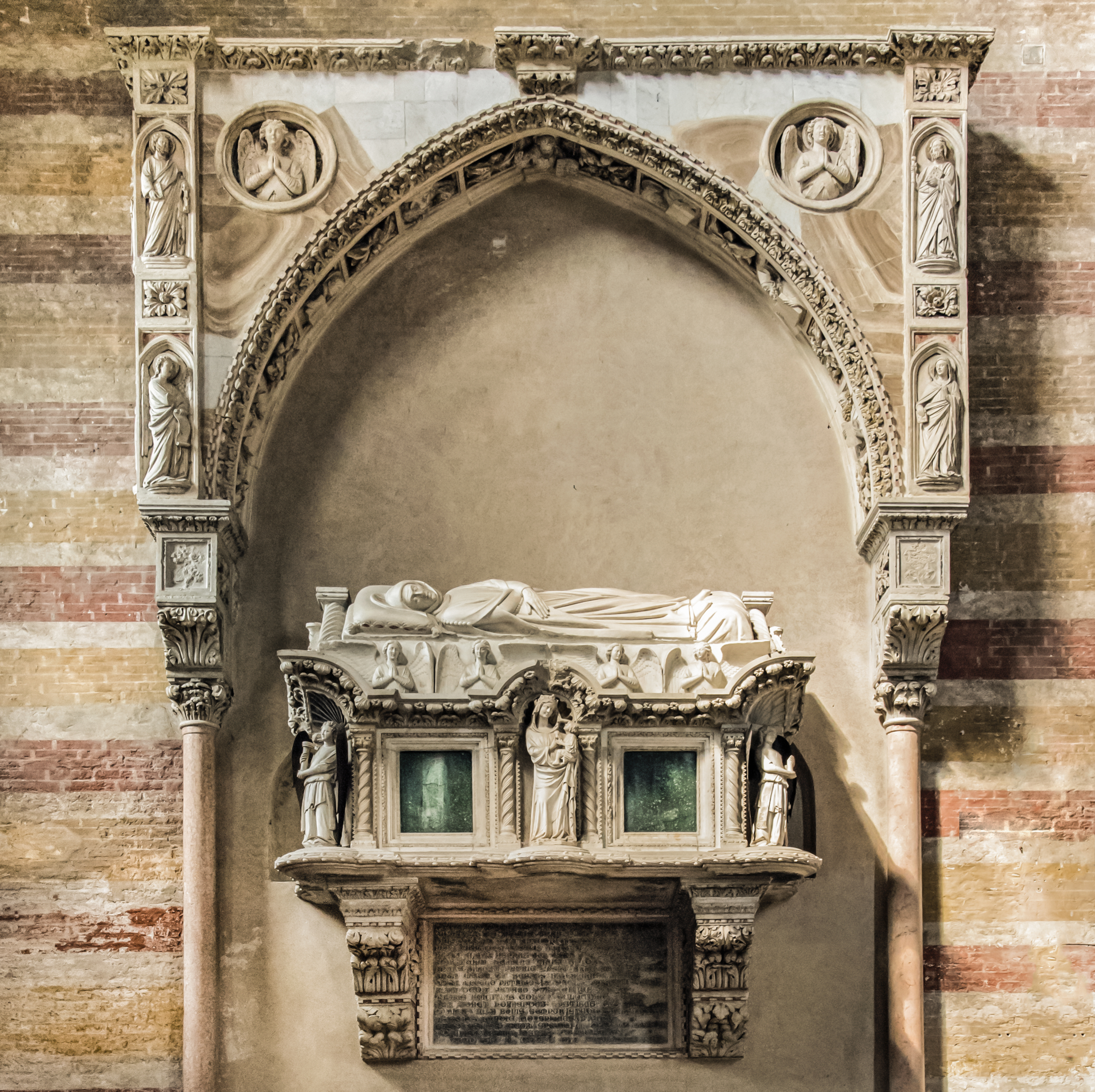
Tomb of Jacopo II da Carrara

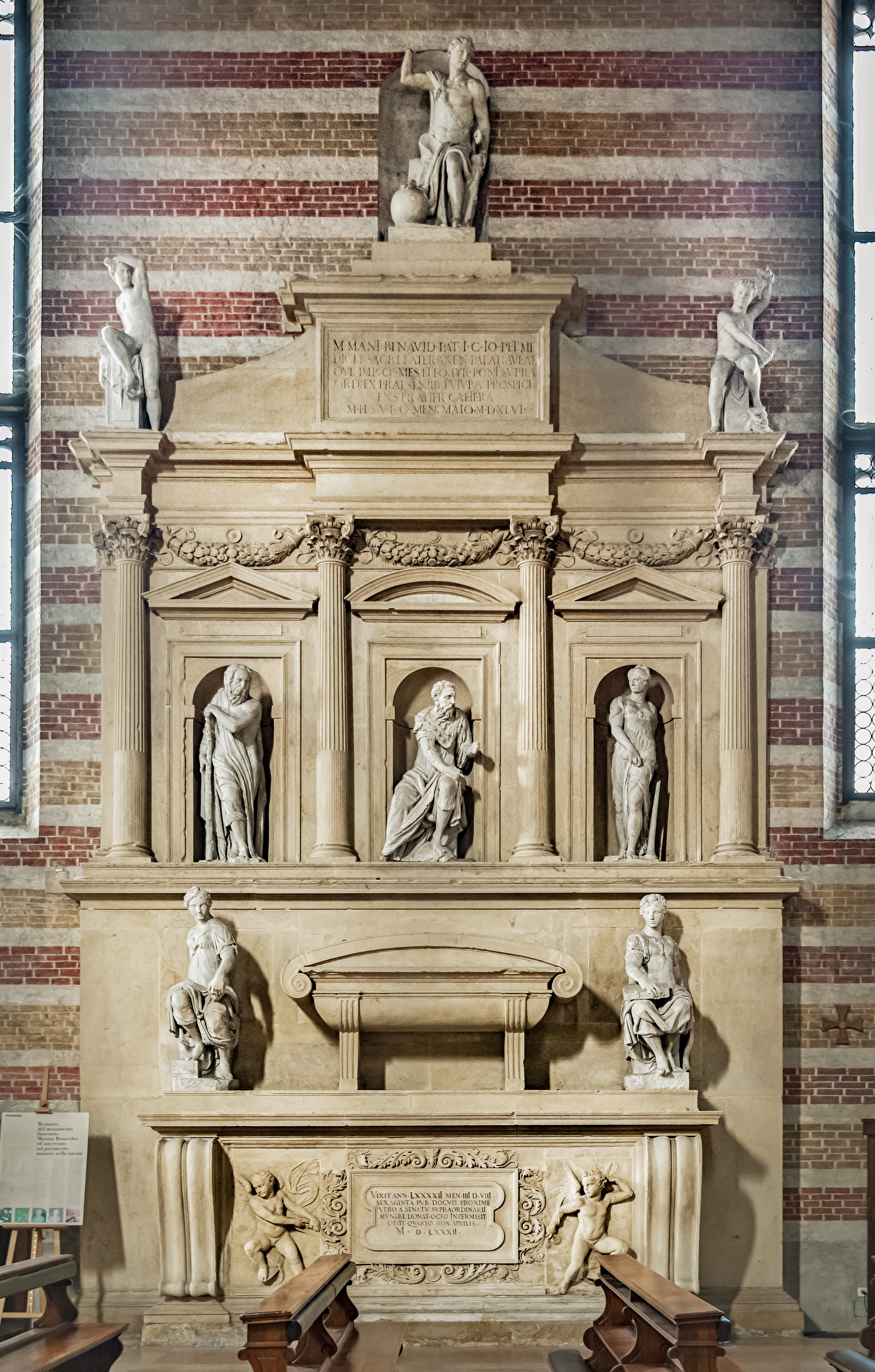
Mausoleum of Marco Mantua Bonavides

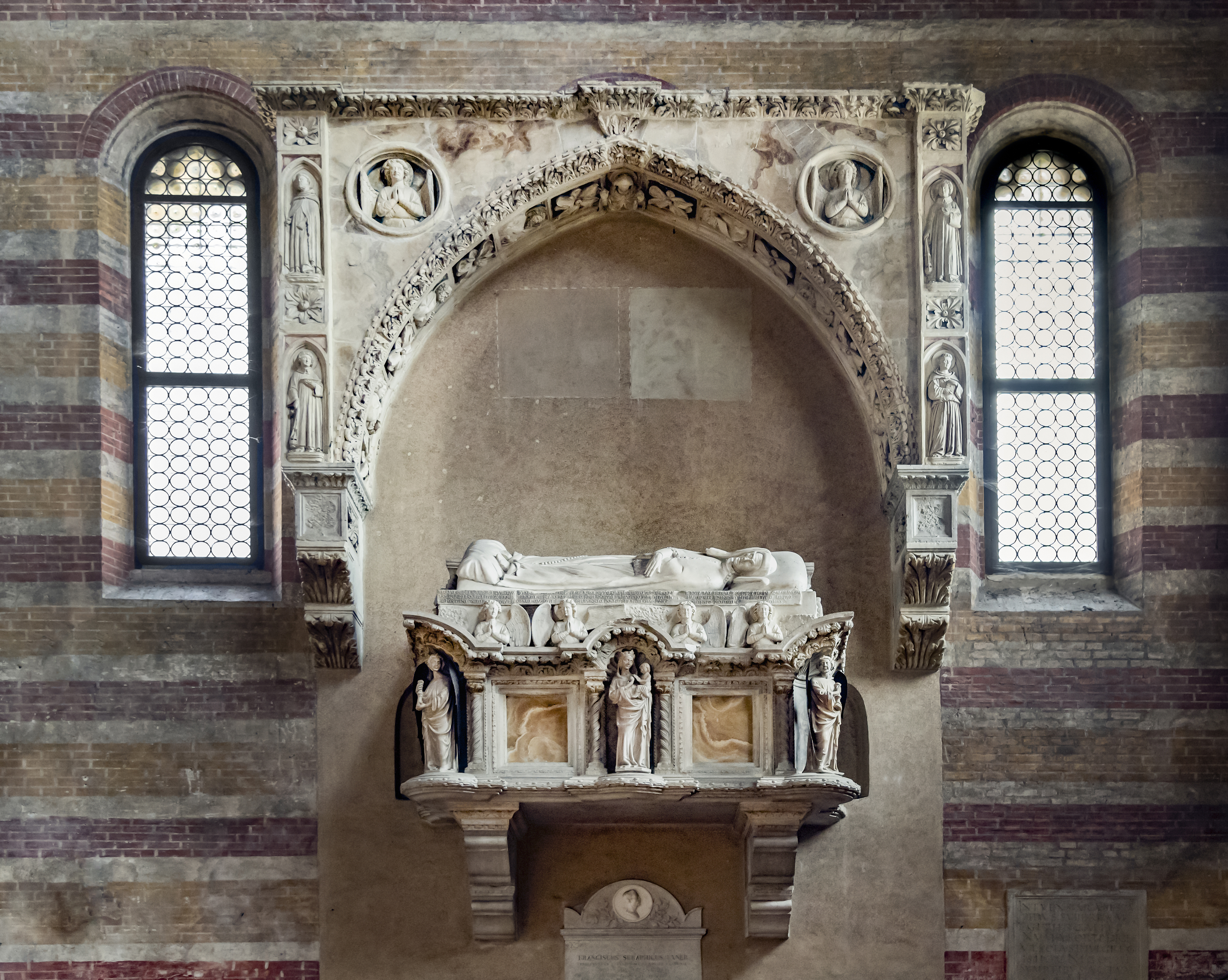
Tomb of Ubertino da Carrara
