= Niccolò Casolani =

Italian painter (1659–1714)

Niccolò Casolani (1659–1714) was an Italian painter.

== Biography ==
He was born in Venice, where he gained the nickname il Nicoletto. He was invited to Florence by Grand Duke Ferdinando II de' Medici, and Niccolò painted members of the Medici family and the court. He painted a series of baccanals (parties) for his patron. He was invited to England where he painted a portrait of queen Anne. He gained a stipend from the English court. He became an alcoholic and died in 1714.

== Sources ==
- Boni, Filippo de' (1852). Biografia degli artisti ovvero dizionario della vita e delle opere dei pittori, degli scultori, degli intagliatori, dei tipografi e dei musici di ogni nazione che fiorirono da'tempi più remoti sino á nostri giorni. Seconda Edizione [Biography of artists, or a dictionary of the life and works of painters, sculptors, engravers, typographers and musicians of every nation who flourished from the most remote times to the present day. Second Edition] (in Italian). Venice: Presso Andrea Santini e Figlio. p. 196.
