= Nicolò Contiliano =

Italian footballer (born 2004)

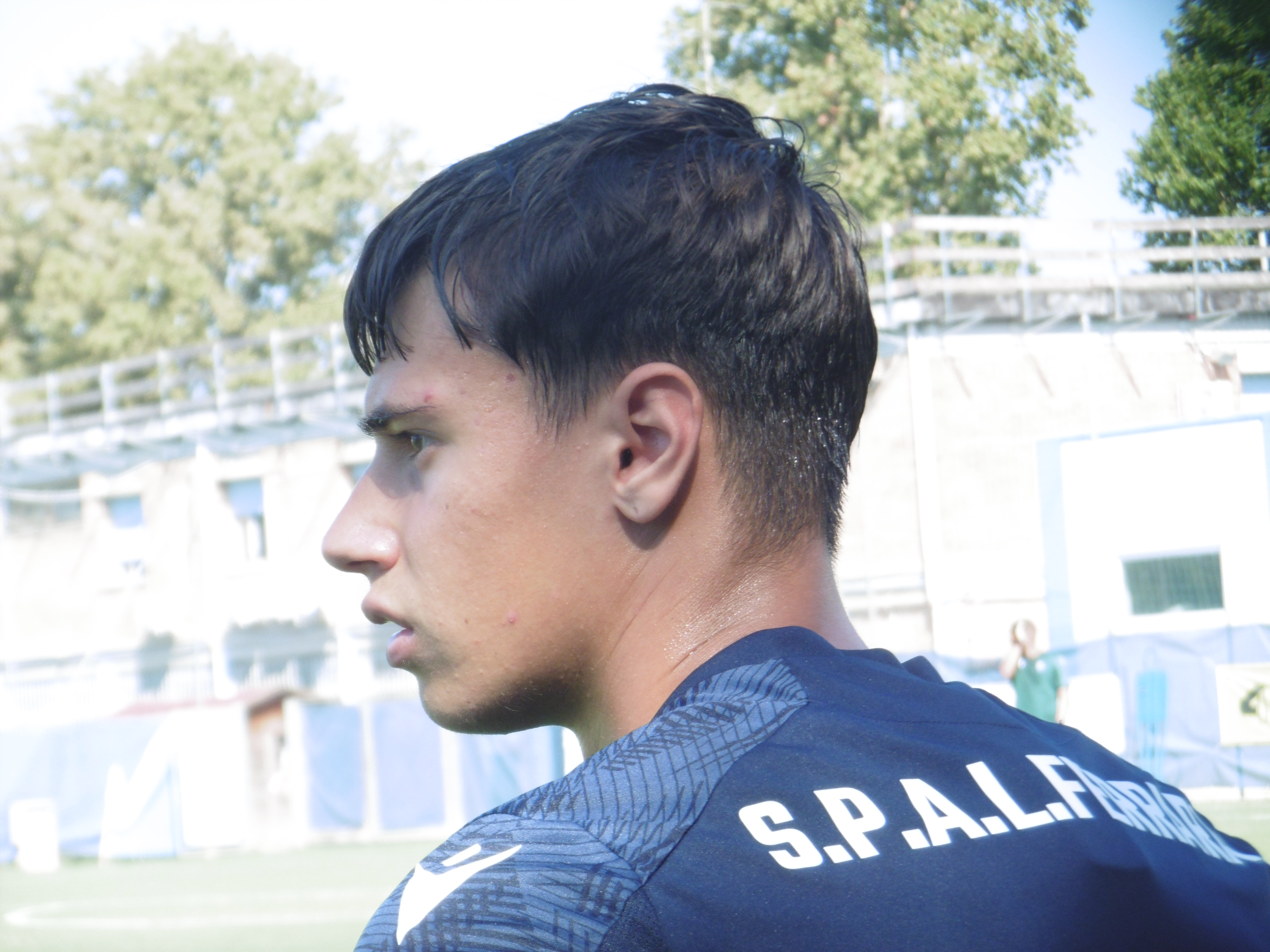

Personal information
- Date of birth: 6 August 2004 (age 22)
- Place of birth: Trapani, Italy
- Height: 1.75 m (5 ft 9 in)
- Position: Midfielder

Team information
- Current team: Cosenza
- Number: 19

Youth career
- 2010–2013: La Vittoriosa
- 2013–2023: SPAL

Senior career*
Years	Team	Apps	(Gls)
2023–2025	SPAL	30	(0)
2024–2025	→ Carpi (loan)	26	(2)
2025–	Cosenza	29	(2)
- * Club domestic league appearances and goals as of 1 May 2026

Nicolò Contiliano (born 6 August 2004) is an Italian professional footballer who plays as a midfielder for Serie C Group C club Cosenza.

== Early life ==
Contiliano was born in Trapani, where his mother, former basketball player Anna Malisardi, was playing at the time.

He moved to Ferrara with his family in 2009, settling in the near comune of Santa Maria Maddalena. He went on to play basketball in Vis Ferrara's youth sector for one season, before switching to football.

== Club career ==
In 2010, Contiliano started playing football for local grassroots club La Vittoriosa, and then joined SPAL's youth sector in 2013. Having come through all of the club's youth ranks, he captained the under-18 squad that won the national championship in 2022, and kept the same role after being promoted to the under-19 team at the start of the 2022–23 season.

During the same campaign, Contiliano signed his first professional contract with SPAL, and was promoted to the first team under head coach Massimo Oddo. On 18 March 2023, he made his professional debut, starting in a 2–0 league loss against Südtirol. He went on to be a part of the team that suffered relegation to Serie C at the end of the season. In October of the same year, he extended his contract with the club until 2026.

On 1 August 2024, Contiliano joined newly promoted Serie C club Carpi on a season-long loan.

== International career ==
In June 2023, Contiliano received his first international call-up, joining a training camp with the Italian under-19 national team in preparation to the UEFA European Under-19 Championship.

== Style of play ==
Contiliano is mainly a holding midfielder, who can also cover in the box-to-box role. He has been regarded for his athleticism, his positioning, his defensive attributes and his leadership skills. A natural left-footer, he has also been praised for his wide passing range, despite not having notable finishing skills.

== Personal life ==
Contiliano's mother, Anna Malisardi, is a former basketball player.

His sister, Alice, is a competitive swimmer.

== Career statistics ==
=== Club ===
As of 4 May 2024

Appearances and goals by club, season and competition
Club	Season	League			National Cup		Other		Total	
Club	Season	Division	Apps	Goals	Apps	Goals	Apps	Goals	Apps	Goals
SPAL	2022–23	Serie B	8	0	0	0	0	0	8	0
SPAL	2023-24	Serie C	22	0	2	0	0	0	24	0
Career total			30	0	2	0	0	0	32	0

== Honours ==
SPAL Under-18

- Under-18 National Championship: 2021–22
