= Landscape with St Paula of Rome Embarking at Ostia =

1639-1640 painting by Claude Lorrain

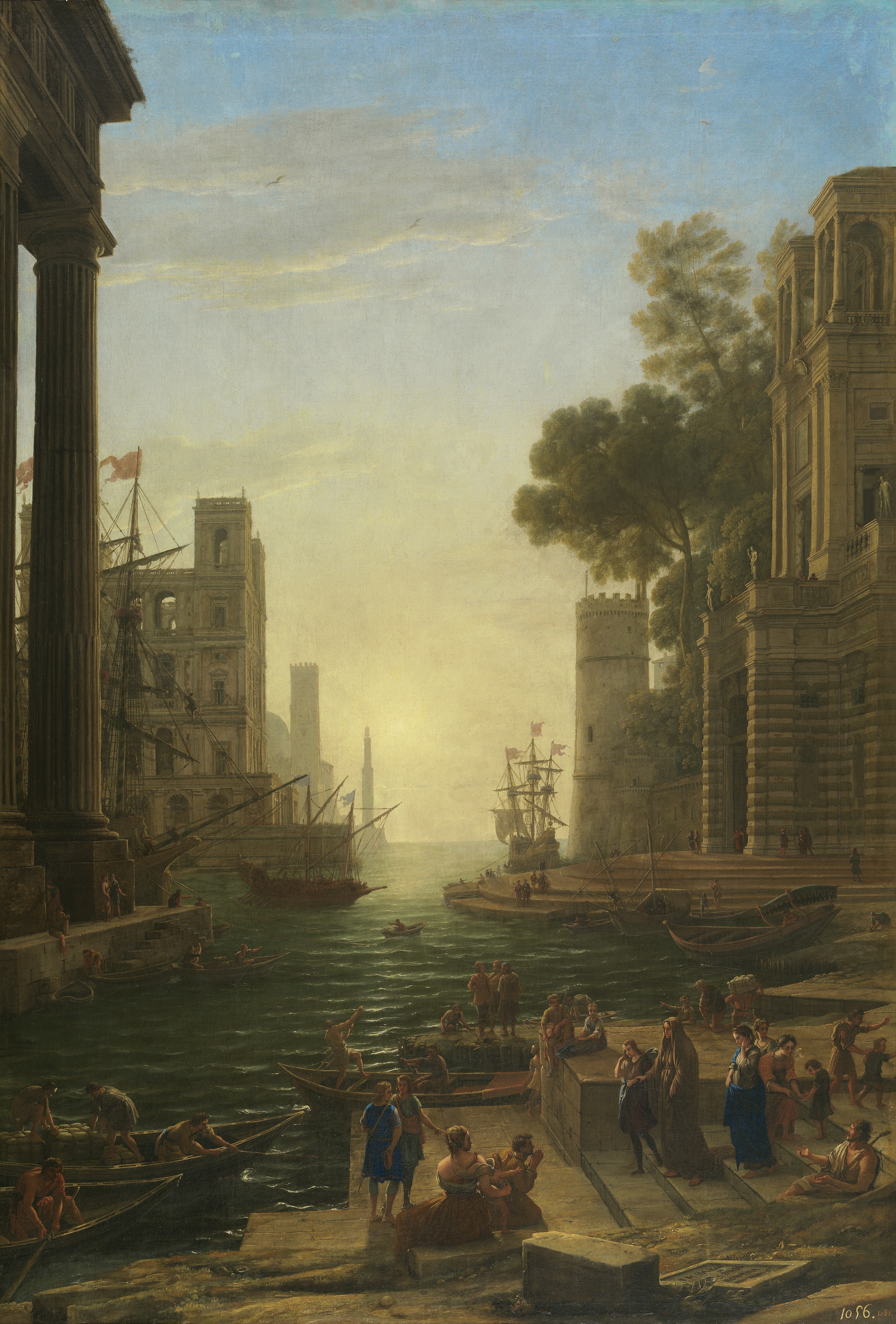
Landscape with Saint Paula of Rome Embarking at Ostia (1639–1640) by Claude Lorrain

Landscape with Saint Paula of Rome Embarking at Ostia or The Embarkation of Saint Paula is an oil-on-canvas painting by Claude Lorrain. It was painted in 1639–1640 as one of a series of works commissioned by Philip IV of Spain for a gallery of landscapes at the Palacio del Buen Retiro – he also commissioned works from Nicolas Poussin, Herman van Swanevelt, Jan Both, Gaspard Dughet and Jean Lemaire. It is now in the Museo del Prado in Madrid.

The series Lorrain produced for the Palacio del Buen Retiro included four in horizontal format, completed during 1635–1638 (Landscape with the Temptation of St Anthony, Landscape with St Onuphrius, Landscape with St María de Cervelló and a lost work) and four in a vertical format, completed during 1639–1641 (Landscape with Tobias and Raphael, Landscape with Saint Paula of Rome Embarking at Ostia, Landscape with the Finding of Moses and Landscape with the Burial of St Serapia). The theme of saints and biblical figures (in this case Paula of Rome leaving Ostia) was imposed on the artist by the count-duke of Olivares, who directed the work.
