= Free logic =

Form of logic

A free logic is a logic with fewer existential presuppositions than classical logic. Free logics may allow for terms that do not denote any object. Free logics may also allow models that have an empty domain. A free logic with the latter property is an inclusive logic.

== Explanation ==
In classical logic there are theorems that clearly presuppose that there is something in the domain of discourse. Consider the following classically valid theorems.

1. $\forall xA \rightarrow \exists xA$
2. $\forall x \forall rA(x) \rightarrow \forall rA(r)$
3. $\forall rA(r) \rightarrow \exists xA(x)$

A valid scheme in the theory of equality that exhibits the same feature is

4. $\forall x(Fx \rightarrow Gx) \land \exists xFx \rightarrow \exists x(Fx \land Gx)$

Informally, if F is '=y', G is 'is Pegasus', and we substitute 'Pegasus' for y, then (4) appears to allow us to infer from 'everything identical with Pegasus is Pegasus' that something is identical with Pegasus. The problem comes from substituting nondesignating constants for variables: in fact, we cannot do this in standard formulations of first-order logic, since there are no nondesignating constants. Classically, ∃x(x=y) is deducible from the open equality axiom y=y by particularization (i.e. (3) above).

In free logic, (1) is replaced with

1b. $\forall xA \rightarrow (E!t \rightarrow A(t/x))$, where E! is an existence predicate (in some but not all formulations of free logic, E!t can be defined as ∃y(y=t))

Similar modifications are made to other theorems with existential import (e.g. existential generalization becomes $A(r) \rightarrow (E!r \rightarrow \exists x A(x))$.

Axiomatizations of free-logic are given by Theodore Hailperin (1957), Jaakko Hintikka (1959), Karel Lambert (1967), and Richard L. Mendelsohn (1989).

== Interpretation ==
Karel Lambert wrote in 1967: "In fact, one may regard free logic... literally as a theory about singular existence, in the sense that it lays down certain minimum conditions for that concept." The question that concerned the rest of his paper was then a description of the theory, and to inquire whether it gives a necessary and sufficient condition for existence statements.

Lambert notes the irony in that Willard Van Orman Quine so vigorously defended a form of logic that only accommodates his famous dictum, "To be is to be the value of a variable," when the logic is supplemented with Russellian assumptions of description theory. He criticizes this approach because it puts too much ideology into a logic, which is supposed to be philosophically neutral. Rather, he points out, not only does free logic provide for Quine's criterion—it even proves it! This is done by brute force, though, since he takes as axioms $\exists xFx \rightarrow (\exists x(E!x \land Fx))$ and $Fy \rightarrow (E!y \rightarrow \exists xFx)$, which neatly formalizes Quine's dictum. So, Lambert argues, to reject his construction of free logic requires you to reject Quine's philosophy, which requires some argument and also means that whatever logic you develop is always accompanied by the stipulation that you must reject Quine to accept the logic. Likewise, if you reject Quine then you must reject free logic. This amounts to the contribution that free logic makes to ontology.

The point of free logic, though, is to have a formalism that implies no particular ontology, but that merely makes an interpretation of Quine both formally possible and simple. An advantage of this is that formalizing theories of singular existence in free logic brings out their implications for easy analysis. Lambert takes the example of the theory proposed by Wesley C. Salmon and George Nahknikian, which is that to exist is to be self-identical.

== See also ==
- Logical cube
- Logical hexagon
- Square of opposition
- Triangle of opposition
- Table of logic symbols
