= Landscape with the Burial of St Serapia =

1639–40 painting by Claude Lorrain

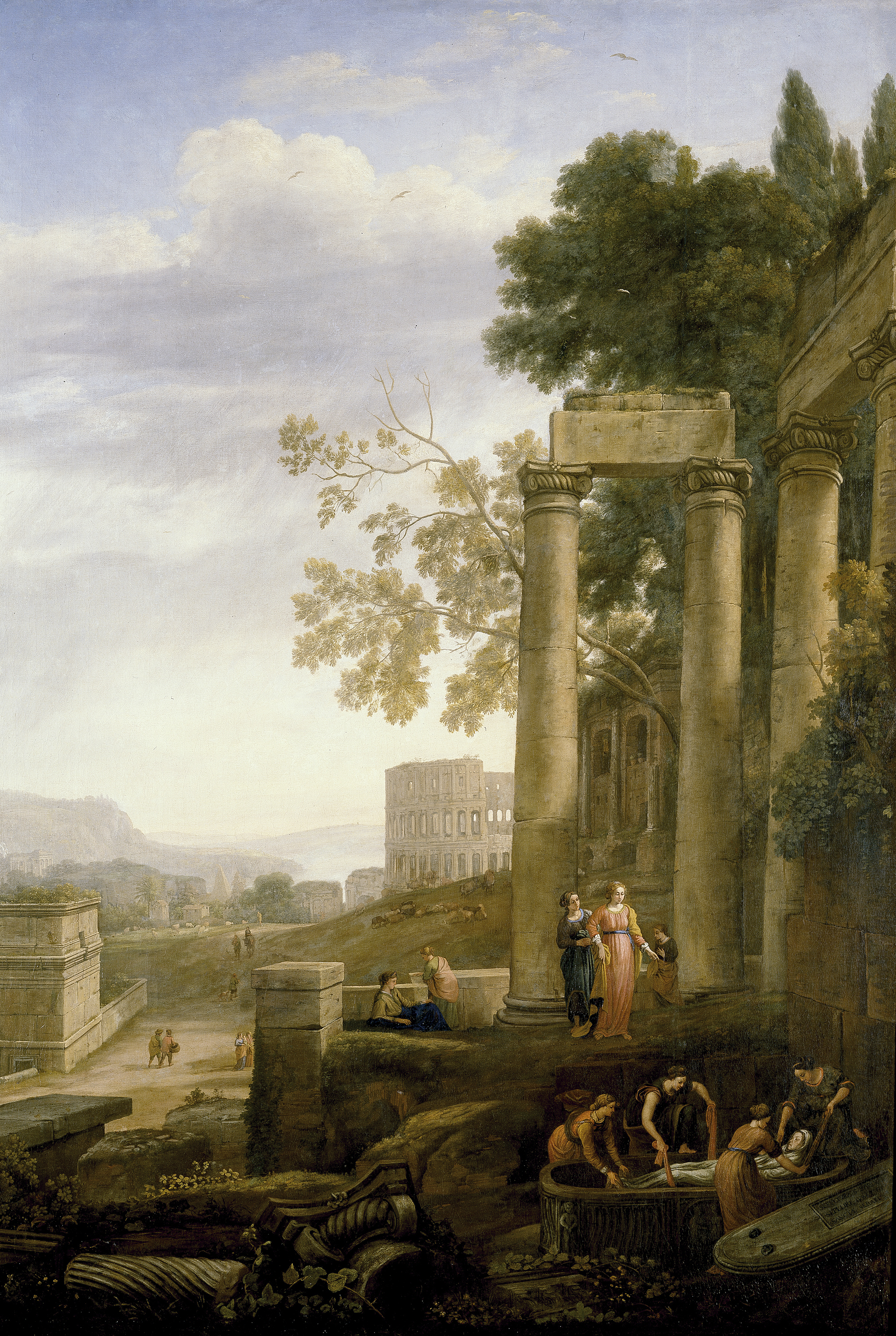

Landscape with the Burial of St. Serapia is a 1639–40 oil painting by the French artist Claude Lorrain. It was one of several paintings commissioned from the artist on behalf of King Philip IV of Spain. It is now in the collection of the Prado Museum in Madrid, Spain.

The painting depicts the funeral of Saint Serapia, a slave to Saint Sabina, with Sabina and others in attendance. Serapia's martyrdom occurred in Vindena, now known to have been sited near Terni. At the time the painting was produced, it was thought to be located on the Aventine Hill, hence the Basilica of Santa Sabina.

In the painting, the inscription on the lid of the sarcophagus reads SEPVLTVRA.S.SABIN (a)... SEPELIR(e) IVBET.C.SANCTAE SERAPI(ae).

== History ==
In 1637, various artists in Rome, including Claude Lorrain, were commissioned by the Marquis of Castelo Rodrigo, the ambassador to the Holy See, to create a series of paintings to doctorate the Buen Retiro Palace. This series of paintings depicted pastoral scenes and scenes of hermits in natural landscapes. Lorrain, along with Nicolas Poussin, were also commissioned to create an addition four landscapes. Poussin painted a pair of mythological scenes, Meleager's Hunt and The Feast of Priapus. Lorrain painted pair of scenes of the lives of the saints, Landscape with the Burial of St Serapia and Landscape with St Paula of Rome Embarking at Ostia.
