= On Interpretation =

Work by Aristotle

On Interpretation (Greek: Περὶ Ἑρμηνείας, Peri Hermeneias) is the second text from Aristotle's Organon and is among the earliest surviving philosophical works in the Western tradition to deal with the relationship between language and logic in a comprehensive, explicit, and formal way.

The work begins by analyzing simple categoric propositions, and draws a series of basic conclusions on the routine issues of classifying and defining basic linguistic forms, such as simple terms and propositions, nouns and verbs, negation, the quantity of simple propositions (primitive roots of the quantifiers in modern symbolic logic), investigations on the excluded middle (which to Aristotle is not applicable to future tense propositions—the problem of future contingents), and on modal propositions.

From the work comes the idea of Apophansis' (Greek: ἀπόφανσις), which considers the nature of nouns and verbs and how they might be combined as a proposition, which is the combination of a subject a noun, a verb, and a tense that can be either outright credible (κατάφασις kataphasis) or not (ἀπόφημι apophasis).

The first five chapters deal with the terms that form propositions. Chapters 6 and 7 deal with the relationship between affirmative, negative, universal and particular propositions. These relationships are the basis of the well-known square of opposition. The distinction between universal and particular propositions is the basis of modern quantification theory. The last three chapters deal with modalities. Chapter 9 is famous for the discussion of the sea-battle. (If it is true that there will be a sea-battle tomorrow, then it is true today that there will be a sea-battle. Thus a sea-battle is apparently unavoidable, and thus necessary. Another interpretation would be: that we cannot know that which has not yet come to pass. In other words: if there is a sea battle tomorrow then it is true today that tomorrow there will be a sea battle. So, only if we can know whether or not there will be a sea battle tomorrow then can we know if there will be a sea battle).

== Contents ==
Chapter 1. Aristotle defines words as symbols of 'affections of the soul' or mental experiences. Spoken and written symbols differ between languages, but the mental experiences are the same for all (so that the English word 'cat' and the French word 'chat' are different symbols, but the mental experience they stand for—the concept of a cat—is the same for English speakers and French speakers). Nouns and verbs on their own do not involve truth or falsity.

Chapter 2. A noun signifies the subject by convention, but without reference to time.

Chapter 3. A verb carries with it the notion of time. 'He was healthy' and 'he will be healthy' are tenses of a verb. An untensed verb indicates the present, the tenses of a verb indicate times outside the present.

Chapter 4. The sentence is an expression whose parts have meaning. The word 'cat' signifies something, but is not a sentence. Only when words are added to it do we have affirmation and negation.

Chapter 5. Every simple proposition contains a verb. A simple proposition indicates a single fact, and the conjunction of its parts gives a unity. A complex proposition is several propositions compounded together.

Chapter 6. An affirmation is an assertion of something, a denial an assertion denying something of something. (For example, 'a man is an animal' asserts 'animal' of 'man'. 'A stone is not an animal' denies 'animal' of stone').

Chapter 7. Terms. Some terms are universal. A universal term is capable of being asserted of several subjects (for example 'moon'—even though the Earth has one moon, it may have had more, and the noun 'moon' could have been said of them in exactly the same sense). Other terms are individual. An individual or singular term ('Plato') is not predicated (in the same) sense of more than one individual.

A universal affirmative proposition, such as, 'Every man is mortal' and a universal negative proposition having the same subject and predicate, such as, 'No man is mortal,' are called contrary. A universal affirmative proposition ("Every man is mortal") and the non-universal denial of that proposition in a way ("Some men are not mortal") are called contradictories. Of contradictories, one must be true, the other false. Contraries cannot both be true, although they can both be false, and hence their contradictories are both true. For example, both 'Every man is honest' and 'No man is honest' are false. But their contradictories, 'Some men are not honest' and 'Some men are honest,' are both true.

Chapter 8. An affirmation is single, if it expresses a single fact. For example, 'every man is mortal'. However, if a word has two meanings, for example if the word 'garment' meant 'man and horse', then 'the garment is white' would not be a single affirmation, for it would mean 'the man and horse are white', which is equivalent to the two simple propositions 'a man is white and a horse is white'.

Chapter 9. Of contradictory propositions about the past and present, one must be true, the other false. But when the subject is individual, and the proposition is future, this is not the case. For if so, nothing takes place by chance. For either the future proposition such as, 'A sea battle will take place,' corresponds with future reality, or its negation does, in which case the sea battle will take place with necessity, or not take place with necessity. But in reality, such an event might just as easily not happen as happen; the meaning of the word 'by chance' with regard to future events is that reality is so constituted that it may issue in either of two opposite possibilities. This is known as the problem of future contingents.

Chapter 10. Aristotle enumerates the affirmations and denials that can be assigned when 'indefinite' terms such as 'unjust' are included. He makes a distinction that was to become important later, between the use of the verb 'is' as a mere copula or 'third element', as in the sentence 'a man is wise', and as a predicate signifying existence, as in 'a man is [i.e. exists]'.

Chapter 11. Some propositions appear to be simple, but are really composite. In a single proposition, the nouns referring to the subjects combine to form a unity. Thus, 'two-footed domesticated animal' applies to a 'man', and the three predicates combine to form a unity. But in the term 'a white walking man' the three predicates do not combine to form a unity of this sort.

Chapter 12. This chapter considers the mutual relation of modal propositions: affirmations and denials which assert or deny possibility or contingency, impossibility or necessity.

Chapter 13. The relation between such propositions. Logical consequences follow from this arrangement. For example, from the proposition 'it is possible' it follows that it is contingent, that it is not impossible, or from the proposition 'it cannot be the case' there follows 'it is necessarily not the case'.

Chapter 14. Is there an affirmative proposition corresponding to every denial? For example, is the proposition 'every man is unjust' an affirmation (since it seems to affirm being unjust of every man) or is it merely a negative (since it denies justice)?

== Square of opposition (logical square) and modal logic ==
The logical square, also called square of opposition or square of Apuleius has its origin in the four marked sentences to be employed in syllogistic reasoning: Every man is white, the universal affirmative and its negation Not every man is white (or Some men are not white), the particular negative on the one hand, Some men are white, the particular affirmative and its negation No man is white, the universal negative on the other. Robert Blanché published with Vrin his book Structures intellectuelles in 1966 and since then many scholars think that the logical square or square of opposition representing four values should be replaced by the logical hexagon which by representing six values is a more potent figure because it has the power to explain more things about logic and natural language. The study of the four propositions constituting the square is found in Chapter 7 and its appendix Chapter 8. Most important also is the immediately following Chapter 9 dealing with the problem of future contingents. This chapter and the subsequent ones are at the origin of modal logic.

== Translations ==
Aristotle's original Greek text, Περὶ Ἑρμηνείας (Peri Hermeneias) was translated into the Latin "De Interpretatione" by Marius Victorinus, at Rome, in the 4th century.

Another translation was completed by Boethius in the 6th century, c. 510/512.

== See also ==
- Hermeneutics
- Interpretation
- Semiosis
- Semiotics
- Sign
- Sign relation
