= Landscape with the Temptation of St Anthony (Savery) =

Painting by Roelandt Savery

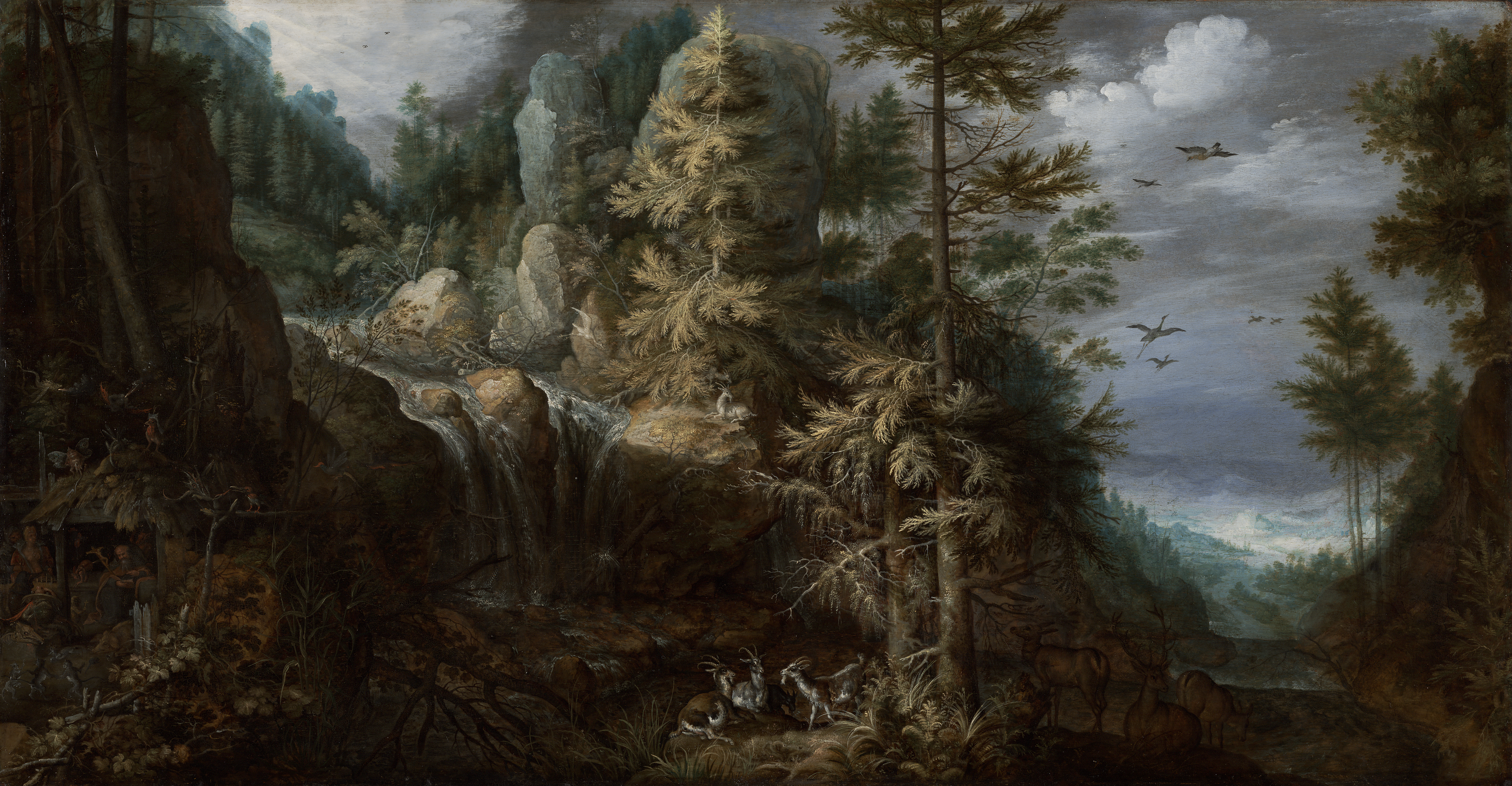
Landscape with the Temptation of St. Anthony (Savery), on display in the Getty Center, Museum East Pavilion, Gallery E203

Landscape with the Temptation of St Anthony is a 1617 oil on panel painting by Flemish artist Roelandt Savery (1576–1639). It is in the J. Paul Getty Museum collection in Los Angeles, California, USA.

There are multiple other paintings with this title, including

- Landscape with the Temptation of St Antony by Claude Lorrain

== See also ==
- Temptation of Saint Anthony in visual arts
