= August 29 (Eastern Orthodox liturgics) =

Day in the Eastern Orthodox liturgical calendar

Eastern Orthodox liturgical calendar
August 28	August 29	August 30
August 29 O.S. ≍ September 11 N.S. August 29 N.S ≍ August 16 O.S.

Fresco of the Beheading of the Glorious Prophet, Forerunner, and Baptist John. (Dionysiou monastery).

August 29 in Eastern Orthodox liturgical calendars is a feast day and a day of commemoration of saints and martyrs. Although some Orthodox churches use the Revised Julian Calendar and others use the traditional Julian calendar, the fixed commemorations for their respective August 29 are broadly the same, no matter which calendar is used. (Note: Despite the dates being the same, the days to which they refer typically differ by 13 days. The notation Old Style or O.S. is sometimes used to indicate a date in the traditional Julian Calendar (the "Old Calendar"). The notation New Style or N.S. indicates a date in the Revised Julian calendar (the "New Calendar").)

== Saints ==
- The Beheading of the Glorious Prophet, Forerunner, and Baptist John (ca. 28) (Note: He was slain before the Pasch. His head was found and enshrined at Edessa today.) (Note: "THE beheading of St. John the Baptist, who was put to death by Herod about the feast of Easter. However, the solemn commemoration takes place today, when his venerable head was found for the second time. It was afterwards solemnly carried to Rome, where it is kept in the church of St. Silvester, near Campo Marzio, and honored by the people with the greatest devotion.")
- Saints Candida (418) and Gelasia (422), of Constantinople.
- Saint Theodora, nun, of Thessaloniki, who was from Aegina (892) (Note: Her memory was celebrated on August 29, but was moved to August 3, due to the feast of the Beheading of the Glorious Prophet, Forerunner, and Baptist John.) (see also: April 5)
- Saint Arcadius of Arsinoe, Cyprus, Bishop and Wonderworker.
- Saint Basil I the Macedonian, Byzantine Emperor (886) (Note: He is not included in the Synaxaria. However his memory is recorded in the Byzantine Church Calendar of Gideon (Βυζαντινὸ Ἑορτολόγιο τοῦ Γεδεῶν), p. 161, as a founder and renovator of many churches and monasteries. Basil (867-886) was included with the saints in some Menologia for his piety and his enrichment of the capital (Constantinople) with sacred buildings to the Glory of God.)

== Pre-Schism Western saints ==
- Saint Sabina, matron and martyr from Rome (c. 126) (Note: "At Rome, on Mount Aventine, the birthday of St. Sabina, martyr. Under the emperor Adrian, she was struck with the sword, and thus obtained the palm of martyrdom." The famous Basilica on the Aventine in Rome is dedicated to her.)
- Saint Sabina of Troyes, by tradition the sister of St Sabinian of Troyes in France where she was venerated together with him (c. 275) (Note: "In the vicinity of Troyes, St. Sabina, a virgin, celebrated for virtues and miracles.")
- Saint Candida, one of a group of martyrs who suffered on the Ostian Way outside the gates of Rome. (Note: "Also, at Rome, St. Candida, virgin and martyr, whose body (relics) was transferred to the church of St. Praxedes by pope Paschal I.")
- Saint Euthymius, a Roman who fled to Perugia in Italy with his wife and his child, St Crescentius, during the persecution of Diocletian (4th century) (Note: "At Perugia, St. Euthymius, a Roman, who fled from the persecution of Diocletian with his wife and his son Crescentius, and there rested in the Lord.")
- Saint Adelphus, an early Bishop of Metz and Confessor (5th century)
- Saint Sæbbi of Essex (Sebbi, Sebba), King of Essex and monk (c. 694) (Note: King of Essex in England. After a peaceful reign of thirty years he became a monk at the monastery of Westminster ('the monastery in the West') which he had founded. His life was one of prayer, repentance and almsgiving.)
- Saint Medericus (Merry), a monk at St Martin's in Autun, where he eventually became abbot (c. 700) (Note: Later he lived as a hermit near Paris, where now stands the church of Saint-Merry.)
- Saint Velleicus (Willeic), born in England, he followed St Swithbert to Germany and became Abbot of Kaiserswerth (8th century)
- Saint Eadwold of Cerne (Edwold), hermit at Cerne in Dorset in England (9th century) (Note: Possibly the brother of St Edmund the Martyr, King of East Anglia.) (Note: Rev. Richard Stanton lists him under Nov. 27th in his Menology of England and Wales as follows: "EDWOLD was brother of St. Edmund, King and Martyr, who, after witnessing the misfortunes of his house and country, resolved to forsake this deceitful world, and prepare for eternity by a life of solitude and rigorous mortification. The retreat he chose was Cerne or Cernel, in Dorsetshire, a spot said to have been formerly visited by St. Augustine, in his attempt to convert the people of those parts. There Edwold lived in a solitary cell, tasting nothing but bread and water, and giving himself up to exercises of devotion. He died with a reputation of great holiness; and the veneration with which he was regarded in later years induced Egelward, a wealthy nobleman, to build a monastery in honour of St. Peter over the place of his burial.")
- Saint Alberic, a monk who lived at Bagno de Romagua in Italy (1050)

== Post-Schism Orthodox saints ==
- Venerable Alexander, Abbot of Voche, near Galich (16th century)
- New Martyr Anastasius (Spaso) of Strumica, at Thessaloniki (1794)

=== New martyrs and confessors ===
- New Hieromartyr Peter Reshetnikov, Priest of Perm (1918)
- New Hieromartyr Peter, Metropolitan of Krutitsa (1936)
- New Martyr Theodore Ivanov of Tobolsk (1937)

== Other commemorations ==
- Commemoration of all Orthodox soldiers killed on the field of battle.
- Translation of the relics (1699) of St. Joseph Samakus the Sanctified, of Crete (1511) (Note: His feast day is on January 22.)
- Repose of Hiero-Schemamonk Poemen of Cernica (1831)
- Repose of Righteous Pachomius the Silent, of Valdai Monastery (1886)

== Icon gallery ==
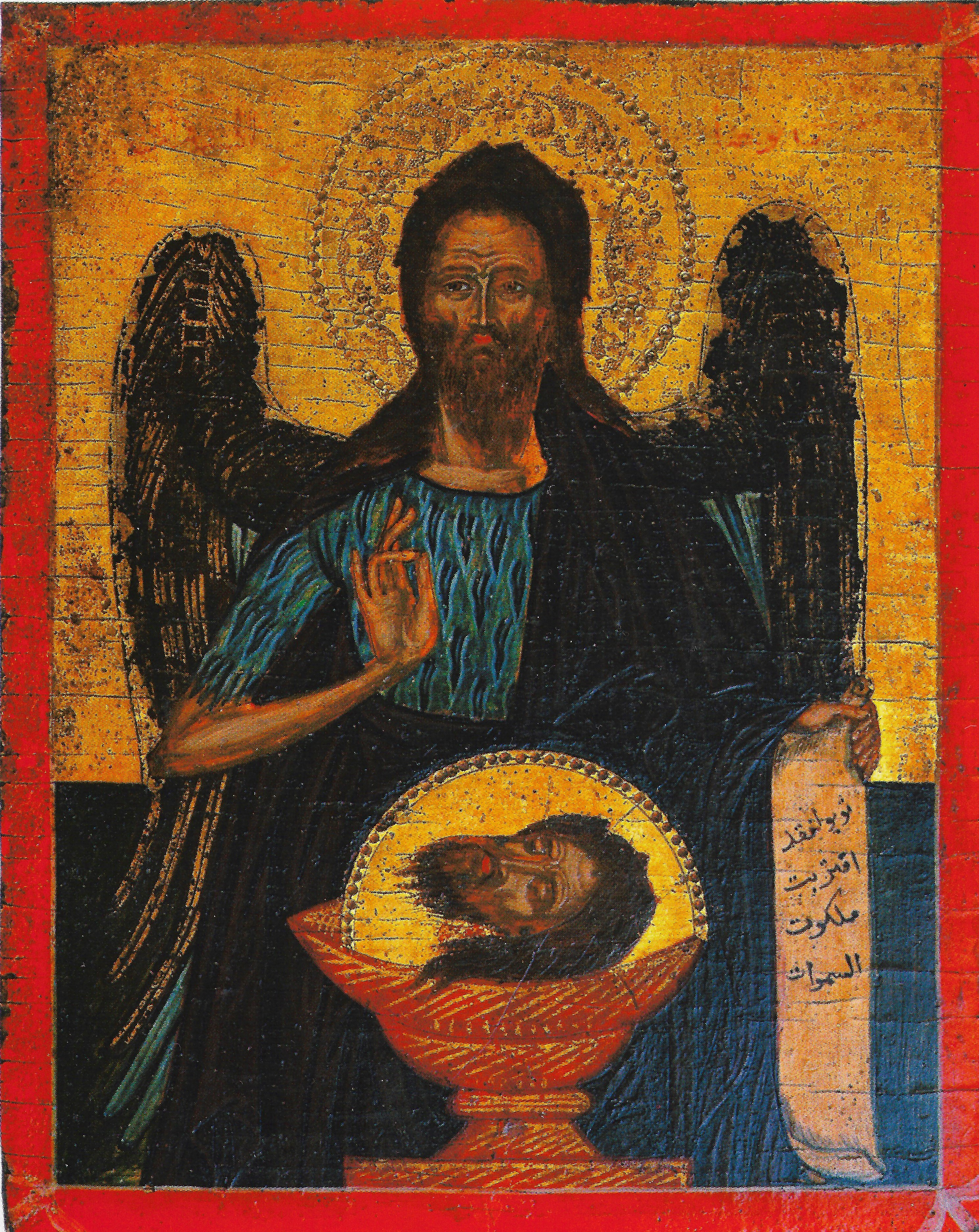
Icon of the Glorious Prophet, Forerunner, and Baptist John.
(18th century).

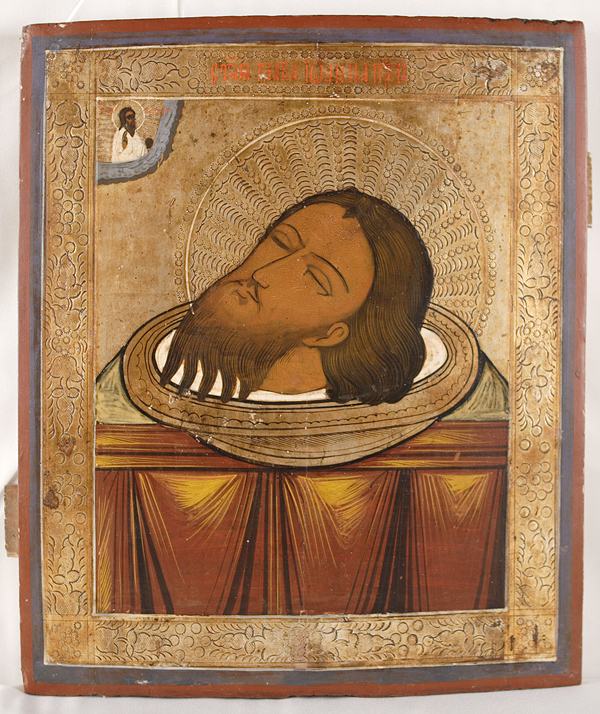
Head of Saint John the Baptist.
(19th century).

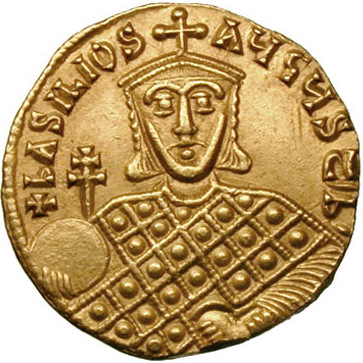
Gold solidus of Emperor Basil I the Macedonian.

== Sources ==
- August 29 / September 11. Orthodox Calendar (PRAVOSLAVIE.RU).
- September 11 / August 29. Holy Trinity Russian Orthodox Church (A parish of the Patriarchate of Moscow).
- August 29. OCA - The Lives of the Saints.
- The Autonomous Orthodox Metropolia of Western Europe and the Americas (ROCOR). St. Hilarion Calendar of Saints for the year of our Lord 2004. St. Hilarion Press (Austin, TX). p. 64.
- The Twenty-Ninth Day of the Month of August. Orthodoxy in China.
- August 29. Latin Saints of the Orthodox Patriarchate of Rome.
- The Roman Martyrology. Transl. by the Archbishop of Baltimore. Last Edition, According to the Copy Printed at Rome in 1914. Revised Edition, with the Imprimatur of His Eminence Cardinal Gibbons. Baltimore: John Murphy Company, 1916. pp. 262.
- Rev. Richard Stanton. A Menology of England and Wales, or, Brief Memorials of the Ancient British and English Saints Arranged According to the Calendar, Together with the Martyrs of the 16th and 17th Centuries. London: Burns & Oates, 1892. pp. 424-426.

Greek Sources

- Great Synaxaristes: (in Greek) 29 ΑΥΓΟΥΣΤΟΥ. ΜΕΓΑΣ ΣΥΝΑΞΑΡΙΣΤΗΣ.
- (in Greek) Συναξαριστής. 29 Αυγούστου. ECCLESIA.GR. (H ΕΚΚΛΗΣΙΑ ΤΗΣ ΕΛΛΑΔΟΣ).

Russian Sources

- (in Russian) 11 сентября (29 августа). Православная Энциклопедия под редакцией Патриарха Московского и всея Руси Кирилла (электронная версия). (Orthodox Encyclopedia - Pravenc.ru).
