= Thomas Joyce =

Thomas Joyce may refer to

- Thomas of Jorz (d. 1310), English Dominican theologian and Cardinal who is often called "Thomas Joyce"
- Thomas Athol Joyce (1878–1942), British anthropologist
- Joyce Cary (1888–1957), Anglo-Irish novelist who used the pen-name of Thomas Joyce in his early career
