= Topological Boolean algebra =

Topological Boolean algebra may refer to:

- In abstract algebra and mathematical logic, topological Boolean algebra is one of the many names that have been used for an interior algebra in the literature.
- In the work of the mathematician R.S. Pierce, a topological Boolean algebra is a Boolean algebra equipped with both a closure operator and a derivative operator generalizing T_{1} topological spaces and may be considered to be a special case of interior algebras rather than synonymous with them.
- In topological algebra — the study of topological spaces with algebraic structure, a topological Boolean algebra is a Boolean algebra endowed with a topological structure in which the operations of complement, join, and meet are continuous functions.
