= Boole's syllogistic =

Mathematical argument

Square of opposition In the Venn diagrams black areas are empty and red areas are nonempty. The faded arrows and faded red areas apply in traditional logic.

Boolean logic is a system of syllogistic logic invented by 19th-century British mathematician George Boole, which attempts to incorporate the "empty set", that is, a class of non-existent entities, such as round squares, without resorting to uncertain truth values.

In Boolean logic, the universal statements "all S is P" and "no S is P" (contraries in the traditional Aristotelian schema) are compossible provided that the set of "S" is the empty set. "All S is P" is construed to mean that "there is nothing that is both S and not-P"; "no S is P", that "there is nothing that is both S and P". For example, since there is nothing that is a round square, it is true both that nothing is a round square and purple, and that nothing is a round square and not-purple. Therefore, both universal statements, that "all round squares are purple" and "no round squares are purple" are true.

Similarly, the subcontrary relationship is dissolved between the existential statements "some S is P" and "some S is not P". The former is interpreted as "there is some S such that S is P" and the latter, "there is some S such that S is not P", both of which are clearly false where S is nonexistent.

Thus, the subaltern relationship between universal and existential also does not hold, since for a nonexistent S, "All S is P" is true but does not entail "Some S is P", which is false. Of the Aristotelian square of opposition, only the contradictory relationships remain intact.

== See also ==
- Boolean logic
- Propositional logic
- list of Boolean algebra topics
