= Saint Serapia =

1st-century Roman saint and martyr

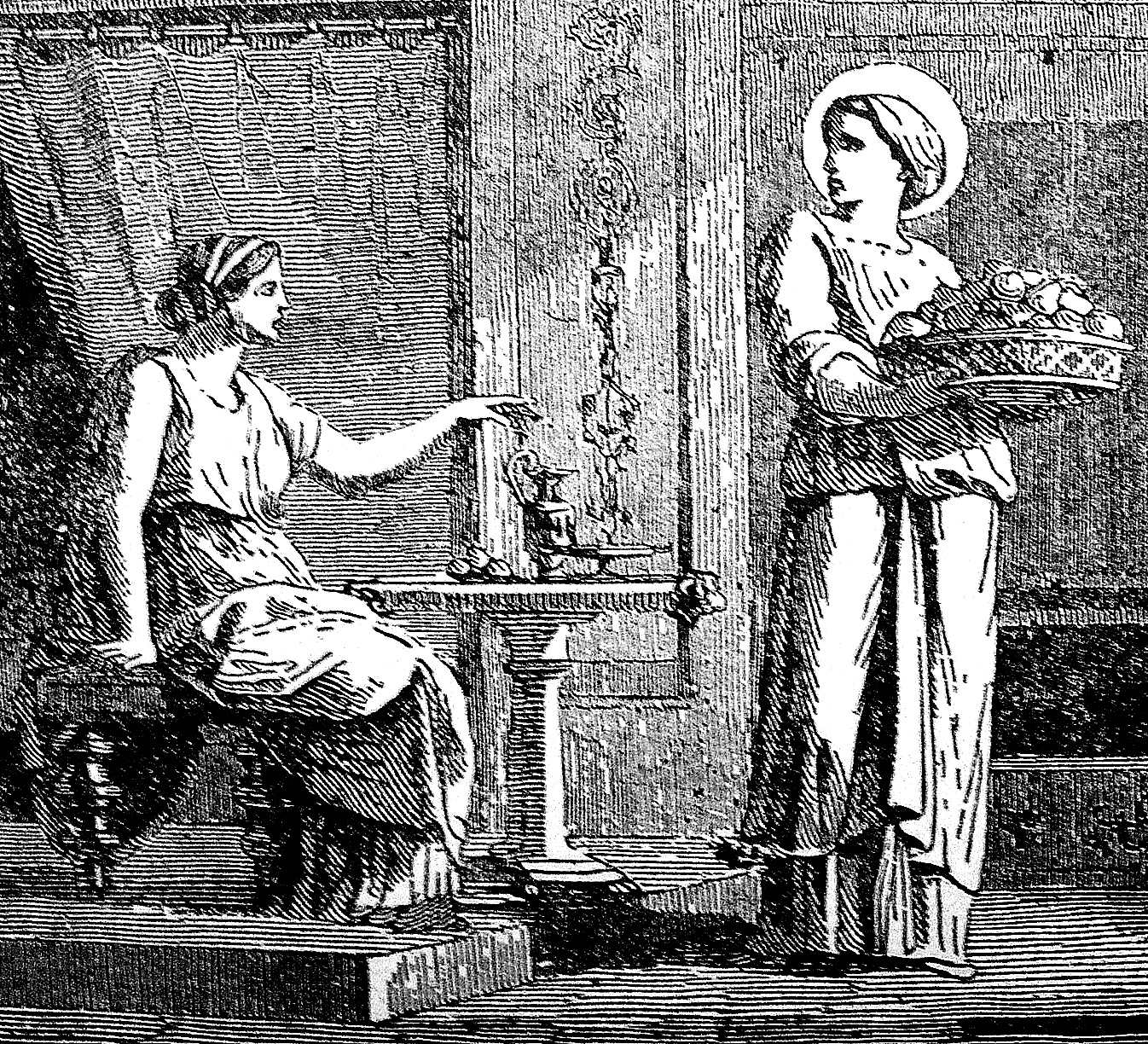
- An engraving of Saint Serapia with her mistress, in Little Pictorial Lives of the Saints (1878)

Martyr
- Born: 1st century Antioch
- Died: c. 119; Rome
- Venerated in: Catholic Church, Eastern Orthodox Church
- Feast: 29 July (Eastern Orthodox & Catholic) and 3 September (Catholic)

Serapia was a Roman saint, a slave and martyr, also called Seraphia or Seraphima of Syria.

Serapia was born at Antioch in the late 1st century, of Christian parents. Fleeing the persecution of Emperor Hadrian, she went to Italy and settled there. Having taken a vow of chastity, she disposed of her property, distributed the proceeds to the poor, and entered the service of a wealthy Roman widow named Sabina, whom she converted to the faith. Sabina then withdrew with a few devout friends to one of her country seats near Vendina in Umbria, where they employed themselves in acts of devotion and charity.

During the reign of Hadrian, Serapia was commanded to do homage to the gods of Rome. She refused and was handed over to two men so they could defile her, but her would-be assailants fell unconscious. The governor attributed her deliverance to sorcery. They then tried to burn her with torches. By command of the judge Virilus, she was beaten with rods and then beheaded by sword.

Sabina buried Serapia in her own family tomb. Sabina met a similar fate not long after. The Basilica of Saint Sabina on the Aventine Hill originally bore a dedication to both saints.

== In art ==
Saint Serapia is depicted holding a tablet or book; sometimes she appears with Saint Sabina.

Around 1639 Claude Lorrain painted Landscape with the Burial of St Serapia for Philip IV of Spain; it now hangs in the Museo del Prado.
