= Karel Lambert =

American philosopher and logician

- Born: 1928 (age 97–98) near Chicago, Illinois, U.S.
- Education: Willamette University (BA, 1950); University of Oregon (MS, 1951); Michigan State University (PhD, 1956)
- Occupations: Philosopher, logician
- Known for: Free logic Lambert's law
- Scientific career
- Thesis: A Logical-Mathematical Analysis of Tolman's Theory of Learning (1956)
- Doctoral advisor: Maurice Ray Denny; Henry Siggins Leonard

Karel Lambert (born 1928) is an American philosopher and logician at the University of California, Irvine and the University of Salzburg. He has written extensively on the subject of free logic, a term which he coined.

== Lambert's law ==
Lambert's law is the major principle in any free definite description theory that says: For all x, x = the y (A) if and only if (A(x/y) & for all y (if A then y = x)).

Free logic itself is an adjustment of a given standard predicate logic such as to relieve it of existential assumptions, and so make it a free logic. Taking Bertrand Russell's predicate logic in his Principia Mathematica as standard, one replaces universal instantiation, $\forall x \,\phi x \rightarrow \phi y$, with universal specification $(\forall x \,\phi x \land E!y \,\phi y) \rightarrow \phi z$. Thus universal statements, like "All men are mortal," or "Everything is a unicorn," do not presuppose that there are men or that there is anything. These would be symbolized, with the appropriate predicates, as $\forall x\,(Mx \rightarrow Lx)$ and $\forall x\, Ux$, which in Principia Mathematica entail $\exists x\,(Mx \land Lx)$ and $\exists x\,Ux$, but not in free logic. The truth of these last statements, when used in a free logic, depend on the domain of quantification, which may be the null set.

== Published works ==
- "Free Logic and the Concept of Existence", Notre Dame Journal of Formal Logic, VIII, numbers 1 and 2, April 1967.
- Philosophical Applications of Free Logic, New York: Oxford University Press, 1991, "A Theory of Definite Descriptions", pp. 17–27, details an account of Russell's Theory of Descriptions in free logic. In the process, he demonstrates how a formulation from Hintikka allows for a contradiction by a correlate in logic to Russell's paradox. He introduces the predicate $(\lambda x)(\phi x \land \neg \phi x)$.
- Free Logic. Selected Essays, Cambridge University Press, 2003.
