= Landscape with the Finding of Moses =

Painting by Claude Lorrain

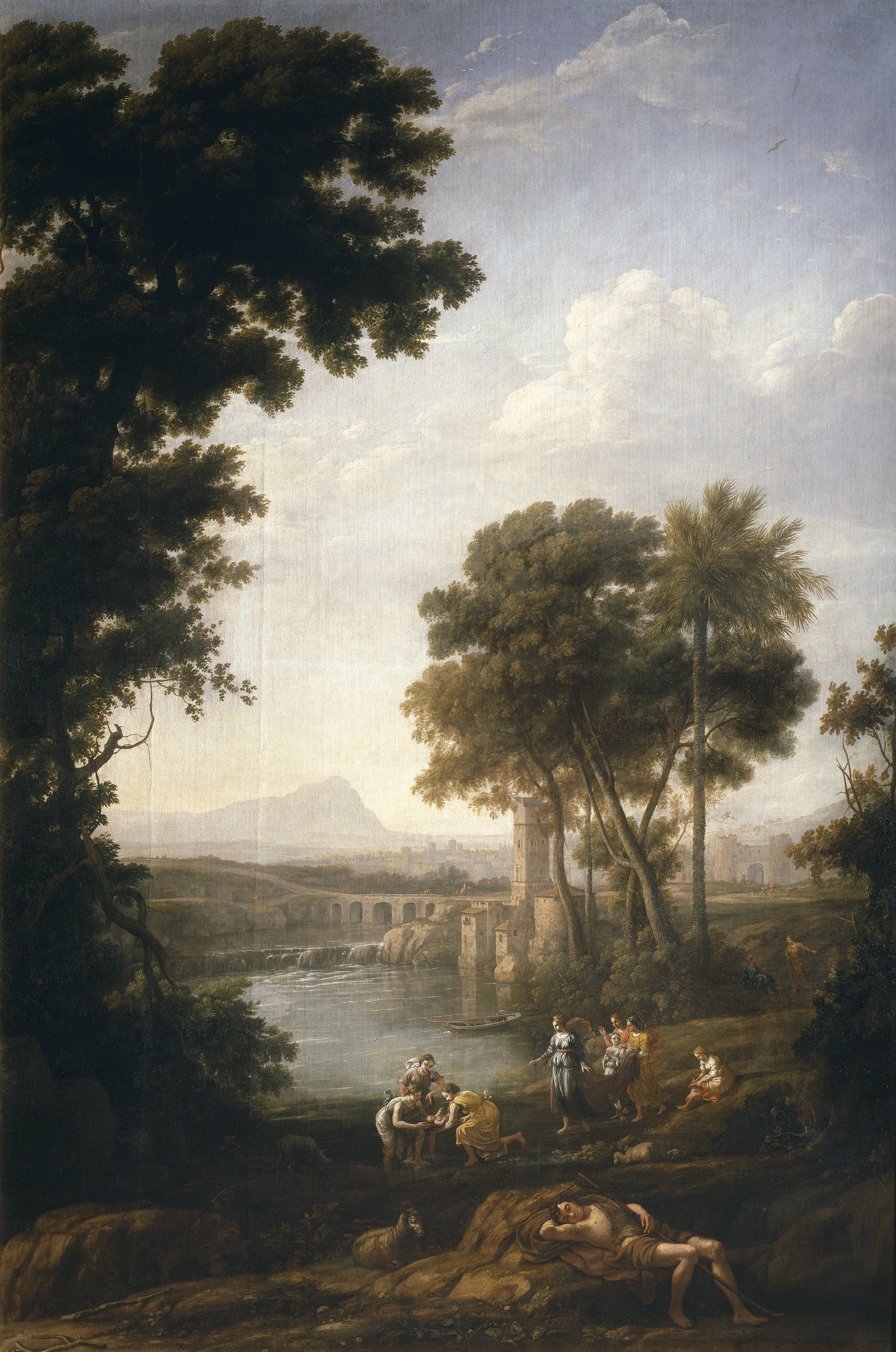

Landscape with the Finding of Moses is an oil painting on canvas of 1639–40 by Claude Lorrain, one of a series commissioned from the artist by Philip IV of Spain for the Palacio del Buen Retiro. It is now in the collection of the Museo del Prado.
