= Thomas of Jorz =

English Dominican theologian and cardinal

Thomas of Jorz's coat of arms.

Thomas of Jorz (died at Grenoble, 13 December 1310) was an English Dominican theologian and cardinal.

== Life ==
He entered the Order of Preachers in England, and was remarkable for his piety, erudition, and executive ability. He was master of theology at the University of Oxford, acted as prior of the Dominican convent there, and afterwards served as Provincial of the English Province for seven years (1296–1303).

He stood in special favour with Edward I, King of England, acting as his confessor and executing several commissions for him. While at Lyons on a commission for the king, 15 December 1305, he was created Cardinal Priest of Santa Sabina by Pope Clement V. This pope also appointed him legate to Henry VII of Germany, but in fulfilling the appointment he was taken sick and died. His body was afterwards transferred to Oxford and buried under the choir of the Dominican church.

== Works ==
His writings are often confused with those of Thomas of Wales, O.P., also called Anglus or Anglicus. His most important work is Commentaria in IV libros Sententiarum. The commentary of the first book (Venice, 1523) still enjoys popularity, and offers a concise refutation of the attacks made by Duns Scotus on the teachings of Thomas Aquinas.
