= Landscape with Tobias and Raphael =

1639-40 painting by Claude Lorrain

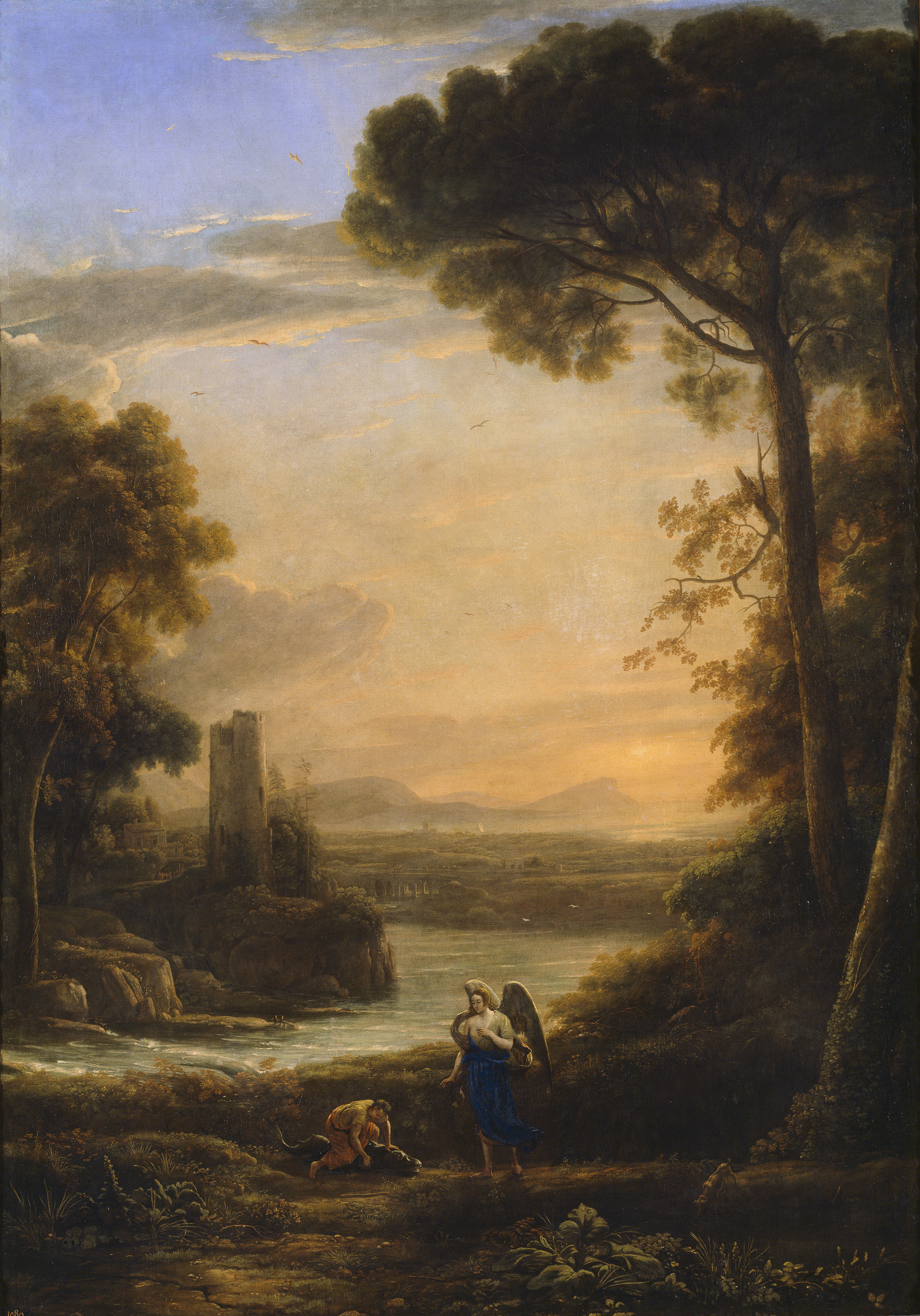

Landscape with Tobias and Raphael is a 1639-40 painting by Claude Lorrain, one of a series of paintings commissioned from the artist for the Palacio del Buen Retiro and now in the Prado Museum in Madrid.

It is one of a number of Claude's landscape paintings that is promoted to a more prestigious history painting by the addition of small figures from a narrative subject. These are either from classical mythology or religion, the latter rather more popular with Spanish collectors. In this case the standard subject of Tobias and the Angel from the Book of Tobit has been chosen, which traditionally has a setting in a wide landscape.

Instructed by the Archangel Raphael, Tobias is gutting the enormous fish he has caught in the River Tigris; he will make magical use of these.
