= Santa Sabina =

Basilica of Saint Sabina at the Aventine
- Basilica di Santa Sabina all'Aventino (Italian); Basilica Sanctae Sabinae (Latin)
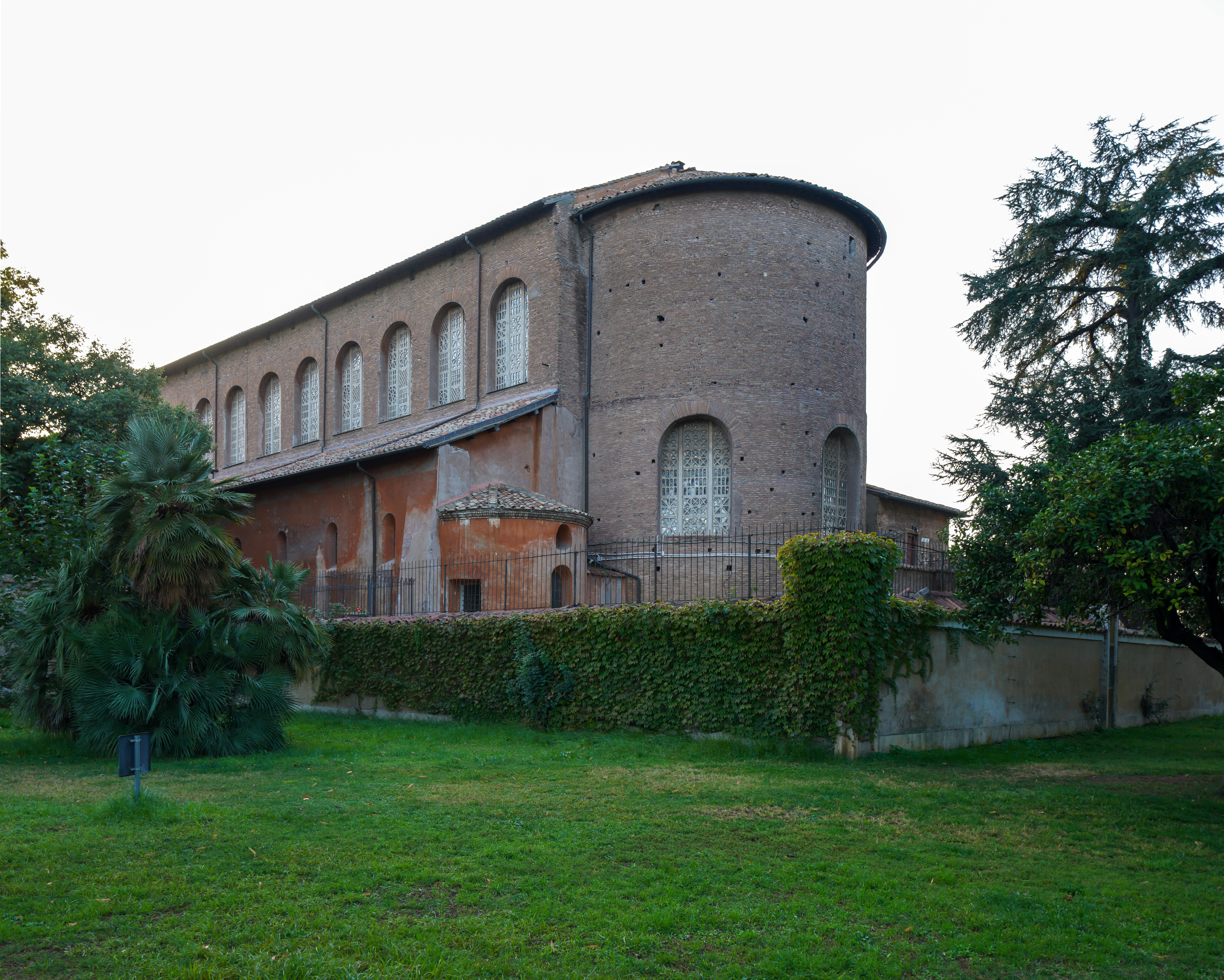
- Click on the map for a fullscreen view
- 41°53′04″N 12°28′47″E
- Location: Piazza Pietro d’Illiria 1 Rome
- Country: Italy
- Denomination: Catholic
- Tradition: Latin Church
- Religious order: Dominicans
- Website: https://basilicasantasabina.it/

History
- Status: Minor basilica, titular church
- Dedication: Saint Sabina

Architecture
- Style: Paleochristian, Baroque, Neoclassical
- Groundbreaking: 422
- Completed: 432

Specifications
- Length: 60 m (200 ft)
- Width: 30 m (98 ft)

The Basilica of Saint Sabina (Latin: Basilica Sanctae Sabinae, Italian: Basilica di Santa Sabina all'Aventino) is a historic church on the Aventine Hill in Rome, Italy. It is a titular minor basilica and mother church of the Roman Catholic Order of Preachers, better known as the Dominicans.

Santa Sabina is the oldest extant ecclesiastical basilica in Rome that preserves its original colonnaded rectangular plan with apse and architectural style. Its decorations have been restored to their original restrained design. Other basilicas, such as Santa Maria Maggiore, have been ornately decorated in later centuries. Because of its simplicity, the Santa Sabina represents the adaptation of the architecture of the roofed Roman forum or basilica to the basilica churches of Christendom. It is especially well-known for its cypress wood doors carved in AD 430-432 with biblical scenes, the most famous being the first known publicly displayed depiction of the crucifixion of Jesus Christ and the two thieves.

Santa Sabina is perched high above the Tiber to the north and the Circus Maximus to the east. It is next to a small public park, the Giardino degli Aranci ("Garden of Oranges"), which has a scenic terrace overlooking Rome. It is a short distance from Santi Bonifacio ed Alessio and from the headquarters of the Knights of Malta.

Its last cardinal priest was Jozef Tomko until his death on 8 August 2022. It is the stational church for Ash Wednesday.

== History ==
The church was built on the site of early Imperial houses, one of which is said to be of Sabina, a Roman matron originally from Avezzano in the Abruzzo region of Italy. Sabina was beheaded in AD 126 under Emperor Hadrian, because she had been converted to Christianity by her servant Serapia, who also had been beheaded in AD 119. Sabina and Serapia were later declared Catholic saints.

Santa Sabina was built by Peter of Illyria, a Dalmatian priest, between 422 and 432 near a temple of Juno on the Aventine Hill in Rome.

Pope Celestine I established the cardinal title of Santa Sabina with its seat here in 423 AD.

In the 9th century, it was enclosed in a fortification area as a result of war.

in 1216 Pope Honorius III approved the Order of Preachers, now commonly known as the Dominicans, which was "the first order instituted by the Church with an academic mission". Honorius III invited Saint Dominic, the founder of the Order of Preachers, to take up residence at the church of Santa Sabina in 1220. The official foundation of the Dominican convent at Santa Sabina with its studium conventuale, the first Dominican studium in Rome, occurred with the legal transfer of property from Honorius III to the Order of Preachers on 5 June 1222 though the brethren had taken up residence there already in 1220.

The church was the seat of a papal conclave in 1287, although the prelates left the church after an epidemic killed six of them. They later returned to the church, and elected Nicholas IV as pope on 22 February 1288.

Its interior was renovated by Domenico Fontana in 1587 (after being commissioned by Pope Sixtus V in 1586) and Francesco Borromini in 1643.

The Kingdom of Italy conquered Rome in 1870; expelled the Dominicans; and converted the church into a lazaretto (quarantine station for maritime travelers).

Italian architect and art historian Antonio Muñoz (1884-1960) restored the original simplistic medieval appearance of the church in 1914-1919. French architect P. Berthier completed its restoration in 1936-1938.

Among those who have lived in its adjacent convent were Saint Dominic (1220-1221), St Thomas Aquinas (1265-1268), Blessed Ceslaus, Saint Hyacinth, and Pope Pius V.

== Architecture ==
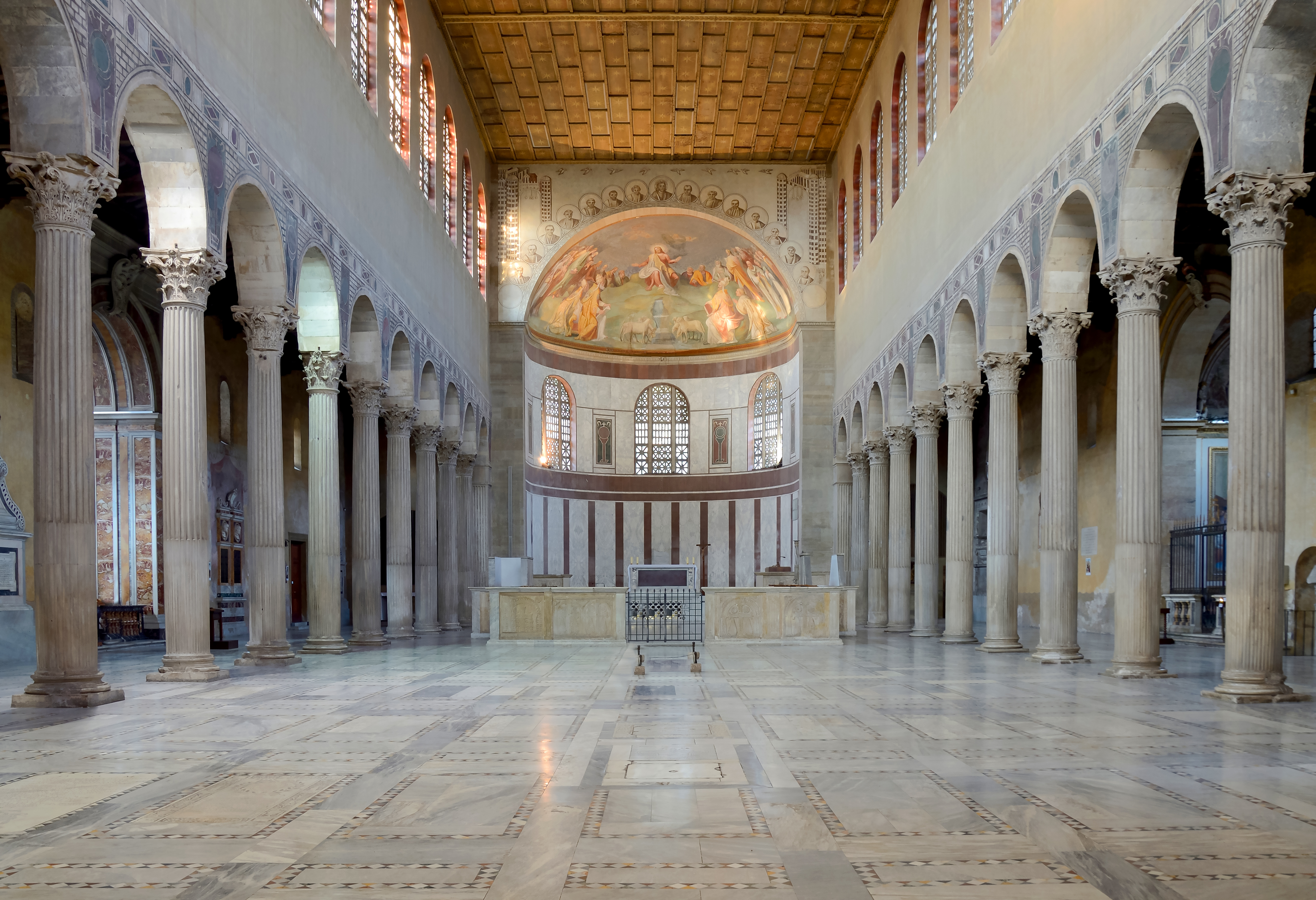
The interior.

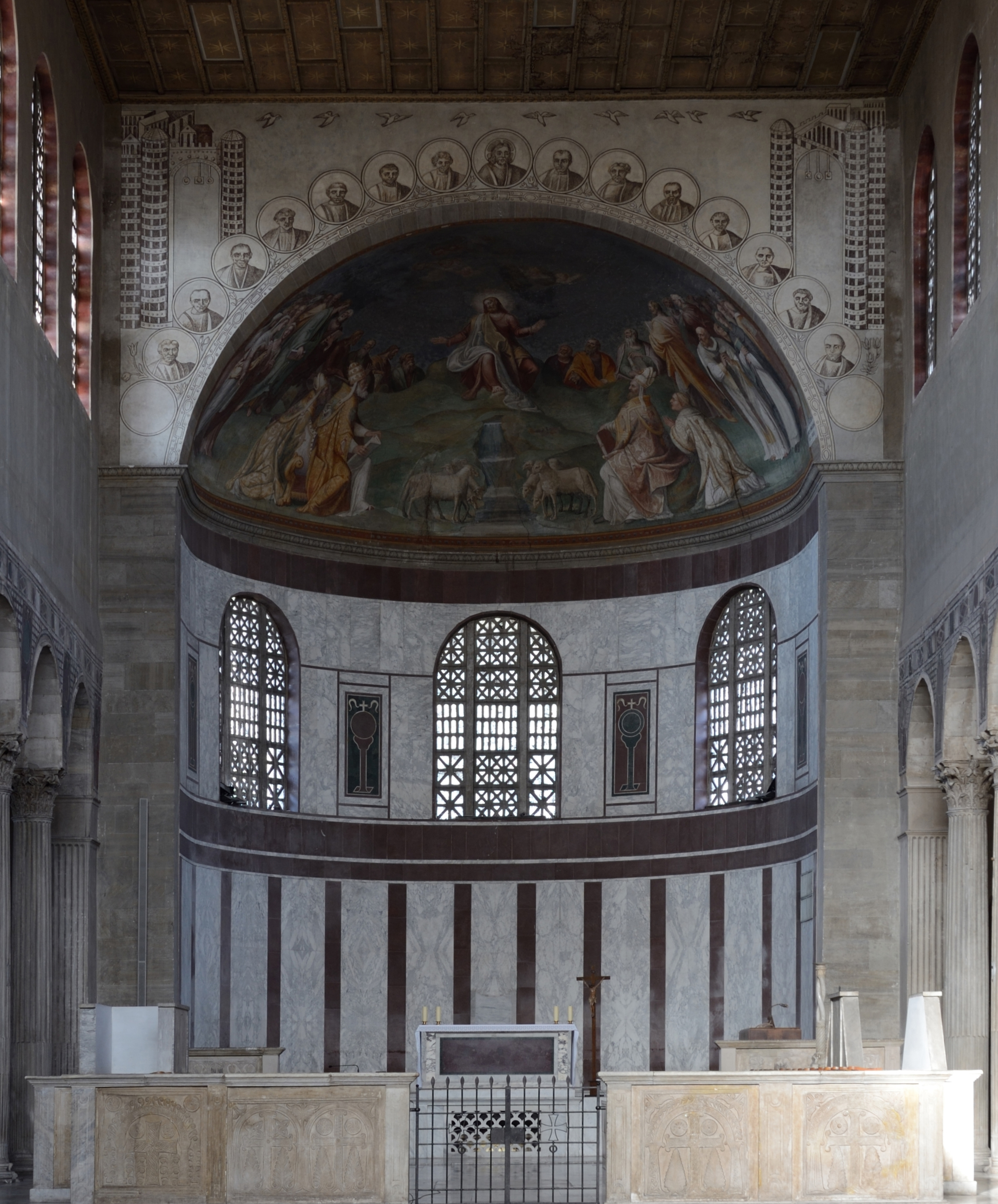
The apse and triumphal arch.

=== Exterior ===
The Minor Basilica of Santa Sabina is built in the manner of an Ancient Roman secular basilica, or covered forum. The characteristics are a long central nave with a lower aisle on each side. Above the aisles, the walls of the nave are pierced by a row of large clerestory windows. The brick walls are mostly unrendered, and the windows are made of selenite, not glass, making the building look much as it did when it was built in the 5th century.

The building has a colonnaded porch opening propped onto a cloister, and at the other end, a semi-circular apse.

The campanile (bell tower) was originally built in the 10th century; but was rebuilt in the 17th century in the Baroque style.

The wooden door of the basilica is generally agreed to be the original door from 430 – 432, although it was apparently not constructed for this doorway. Eighteen of its wooden panels survive — all but one depicting scenes from the Bible. Most famous among these is one of the earliest certain depictions of the crucifixion of Jesus Christ and the two thieves. Other panels have also been the subjects of extensive analysis because of their importance to the study of Christian iconography.

Above the doorway, the interior preserves an original dedication in Latin hexameters.

=== Interior ===
The interior has basilical form, with a central nave divided from the side aisle by two rows of columns, on which rests an arcade. Above the arcade is a row of large clerestory windows. The twenty four columns of Proconnesian marble with perfectly matched Corinthian capitals and bases, were reused from the Temple of Juno. A framed hole in the floor exposes a Roman era temple column that pre-dates Santa Sabina. This appears to be the remnant of the Temple of Juno erected on the hilltop site during Roman times, which was likely razed to allow construction of the basilica.

There is an apse at the eastern end. The original fifth-century apse mosaic was replaced in 1559 by a fresco by Taddeo Zuccari. The composition probably remained unchanged: Christ is flanked by a good thief and a bad thief, seated on a hill while lambs drink from a stream at its base. The iconography of the mosaic was very similar to another 5th-century mosaic, destroyed in the 17th century, in Sant'Andrea in Catabarbara.

=== Convent ===
The interior cells of the Dominican convent are little changed since the earliest days of the Order of Preachers. The cell of St. Dominic is still identified, though it has since been enlarged and converted to a chapel. Also, the original dining room still remains, in which St. Thomas Aquinas would dine when he lived in Rome.

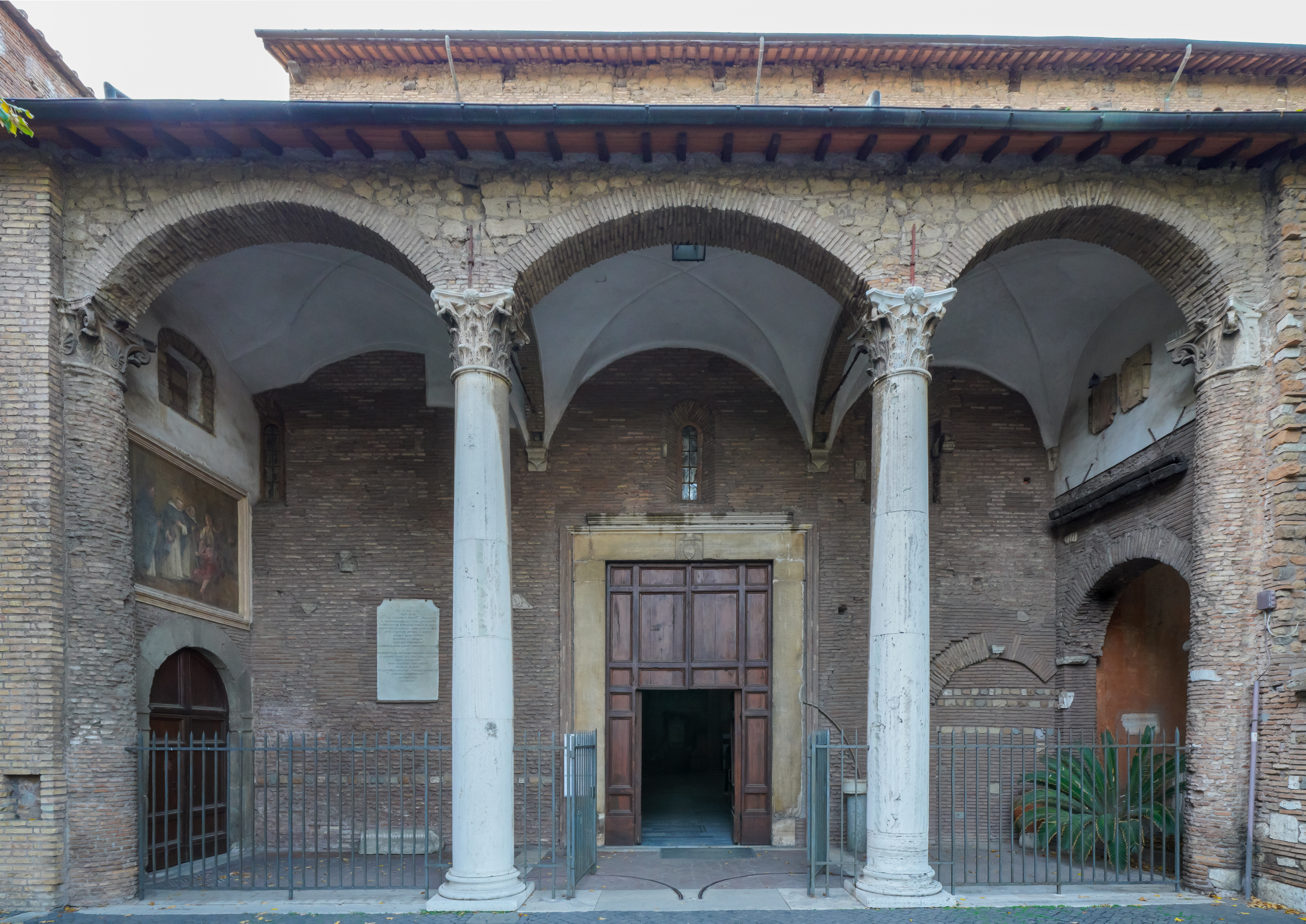
The side portico.

== Doors ==
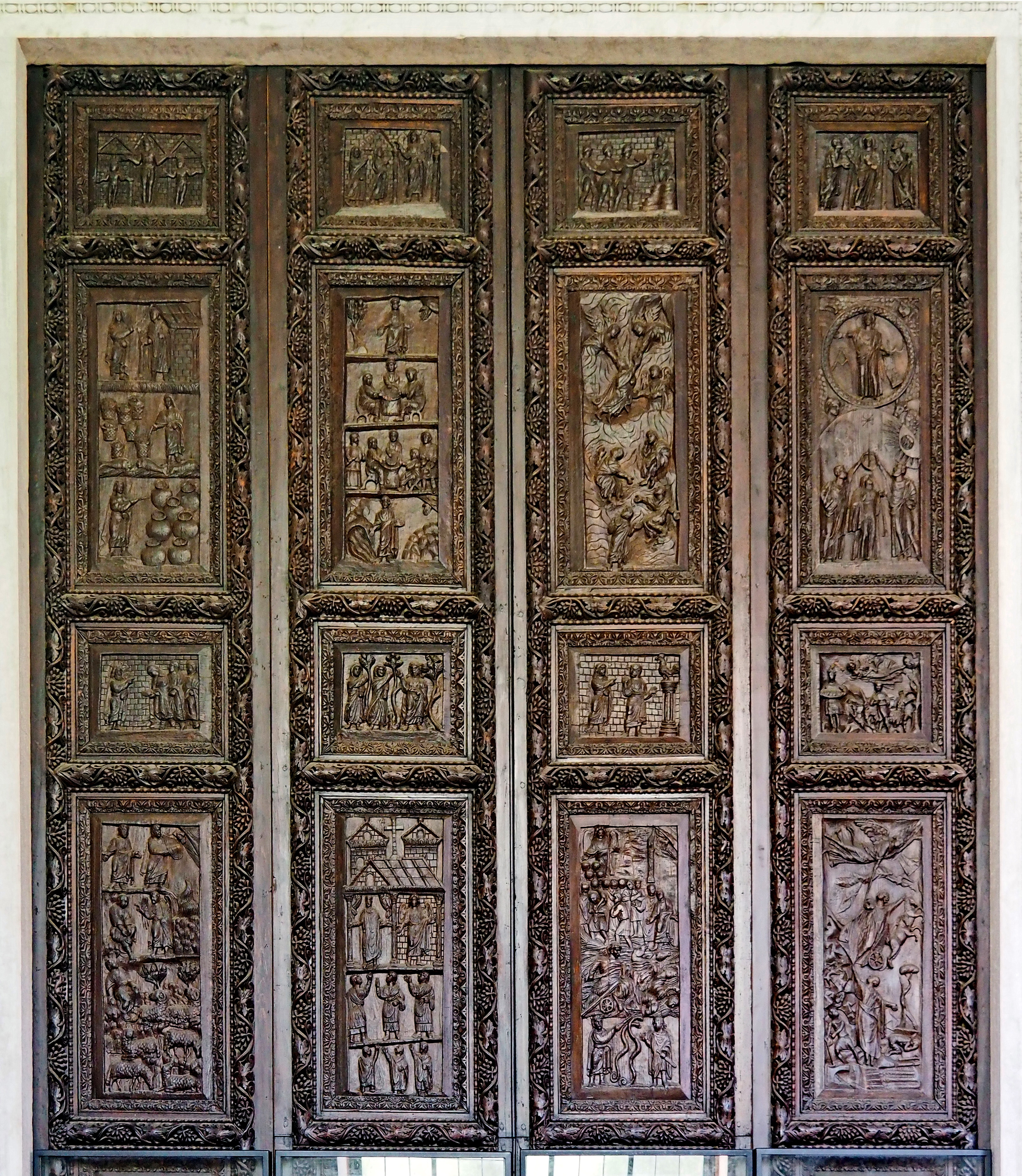
The doors.

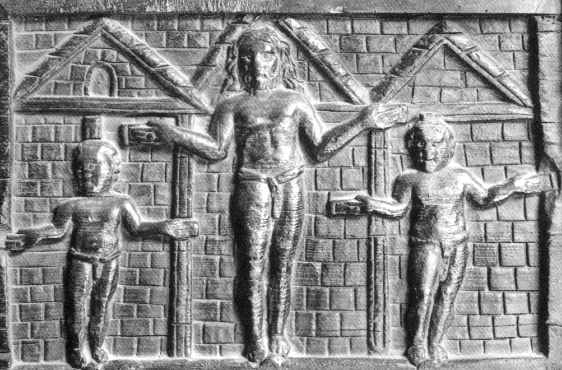
A depiction of the crucifixion on the wooden door of Santa Sabina. This is one of the earliest surviving depictions of the crucifixion of Christ.

The doors on the exterior of Santa Sabina are made of cypress wood, and originally had a layout of twenty-eight panels. Out of these panels, ten of the original have been lost, and are left without ornamentation.

Seventeen out of the original remaining eighteen panels depict a scene from the Old Testament or the New Testament, leaving one panel that does not directly correlate to a Biblical story. This panel, found near the bottom of the door, depicts a homage to a man wearing a chlamys, and is thought to depict a historical event relating to a powerful ruler, though the exact story depicted is unknown.

One of the smaller top panels depicts the crucifixion of Jesus and two other figures in front of a building that alludes to the architecture of a Roman mausoleum. This panel is the first known publicly displayed image of the crucifixion of Christ. The panels are carved in two distinct styles, one including more detail and adherence to the style of classical art, and one adopting a simpler style, indicating that several artists may have worked on the doors. The abstract vegetal designs on the panels' frames are consistent with a Mesopotamian style, suggesting the origin of at least one of the artists was from this region.

Due to the cramped composition of the panels and the thin outer frame, it is likely that the door was originally bigger, then cut down to fit into the frame of Santa Sabina. This makes it unclear as to whether the door was initially intended to be used for this specific structure. It may have been designed for a different Roman building with larger doorway dimensions, but then been transferred to Santa Sabina for unknown reasons.

However, the door was most likely constructed near the same time as the erection of the Church of Santa Sabina in 432, as the powerful figure in the chlamys scene carving shares stylistic similarities with depictions of Theodosius II, the emperor at the time of the consecration of Santa Sabina. Dendrochronologic and radiocarbon dating confirmed that the wood used for the door panels is from the beginning of the 5th century, therefore the carvings could date from the reigns of Celestine I (421–431) or Sixtus III (431–440).

== Convent and Studium of the Dominican Order ==
In 1216 the Order of Preachers, now commonly known as the Dominicans, was approved by Pope Honorius as "the first order instituted by the Church with an academic mission". Honorius III invited Saint Dominic, the founder of the Order of Preachers, to take up residence at the church of Santa Sabina in 1220. The official foundation of the Dominican convent at Santa Sabina with its studium conventuale, the first Dominican studium in Rome, occurred with the legal transfer of property from Honorius III to the Order of Preachers on 5 June 1222, though the brethren had taken up residence there already in 1220.

Some scholars have written that Honorius III was a member of the Savelli family and that the church and associated buildings formed part of the holdings of the Savelli, thereby explaining why Honorius III donated Santa Sabina to the Dominicans. In fact, Honorius III was not a Savelli. These scholars may have confused him with the later Pope Honorius IV, who did belong to the family. In any case, the church was given over to the Dominicans and it has since then served as their headquarters in Rome.

In 1265 in accordance with the injunction of the Chapter of the Roman province of the Order of Preachers at Anagni, Thomas Aquinas was assigned as regent master at the studium conventuale at Santa Sabina: “Fr. Thome de Aquino iniungimus in remissionem peccatorum quod teneat studium Rome, et volumus quod fratribus qui stant secum ad studendum provideatur in necessariis vestimentis a conventibus de quorum predicatione traxerunt originem. Si autem illi studentes inventi fuerint negligentes in studio, damus potestatem fr. Thome quod ad conventus suos possit eos remittere”. [We enjoin Brother Thomas Aquinas, in the remission of sins, that he continue his studies in Rome, and we desire that the brothers who stand with him to study be provided with the necessary clothing by the convents from whose preaching they originated. But if those students are found negligent in their studies, we give power to Brother Thomas to send them back to their convents.]

At this time the existing studium conventuale at Santa Sabina was transformed into the Order's first studium provinciale, an intermediate school between the studium conventuale and the studium generale. "Prior to this time the Roman Province had offered no specialized education of any sort, no arts, no philosophy; only simple convent schools, with their basic courses in theology for resident friars, were functioning in Tuscany and the meridionale during the first several decades of the order's life. But the new studium at Santa Sabina was to be a school for the province," a studium provinciale. Tolomeo da Lucca, an associate and early biographer of Aquinas, tells us that at the Santa Sabina studium Aquinas taught the full range of philosophical subjects, both moral and natural.

With the departure of Aquinas for Paris in 1268 and the passage of time the pedagogical activities of the studium provinciale at Santa Sabina were divided between two campuses. A new convent of the Order at the Church of Santa Maria sopra Minerva had a modest beginning in 1255 as a community for women converts, but grew rapidly in size and importance after being given to the Dominicans in 1275.

In 1288 the theology component of the provincial curriculum was relocated from the Santa Sabina studium provinciale to the studium conventuale at Santa Maria sopra Minerva which was redesignated as a studium particularis theologiae. Thus, the studium at Santa Sabina was the forerunner of the studium generale at Santa Maria sopra Minerva.

Following the curriculum of studies laid out in the capitular acts of 1291 the Santa Sabina studium was redesignated as one of three studia nove logice intended to offer courses of advanced logic covering the logica nova, the Aristotelian texts recovered in the West only in the second half of the 12th century, the Topics, Sophistical Refutations, and the Prior and Second Analytics of Aristotle. This was an advance over the logica antiqua, which treated the Isagoge of Porphyry, Divisions and Topics of Boethius, the Categories and On Interpretation of Aristotle, and the Summule logicales of Peter of Spain.

Milone da Velletri was the lector at the Santa Sabina studium in 1293. In 1310 the Florentine Giovanni dei Tornaquinci was the lector at Santa Sabina. In 1331 at the Santa Sabina studium Nerius de Tertia was the lector, and Giovanni Zocco da Spoleto was a student of logic.

== List of cardinal priests ==
- Peter the Illyrian (425 – ?)
- Valens (494 – ?)
- Basil (523 – ?)
- Felix (590 – before 612)
- Marinus (612 – ?)
- Marinus (fl. 721)
- Tordonus (741 – before 745)
- Theophilus (745 – 757)
- Theophilus (757 – 761)
- Peter William (761 – ?)
- Eugenio Savelli (816 – May 824 elected pope)
- Gioviniano (853 – ?)
- Stefano (964 – ?)
- Martino (1033 – before 1058)
- Bruno (1058 – before 1088)
- Alberico (1088 – circa 1092)
- Bruno (1092 – circa 1099)
- Alberto (1099 – 1100)
- Vitale (1105 – before 1112)
- Uberto (1112 – circa 1117)
- Roberto (1120 – 1122)
- Gregorio (1126 – circa 1137, deceased)
- Stanzio (1137 – 1143, deceased)
- Manfredo (17 December 1143 – circa 1158, deceased)
- Galdino Valvassi della Sala (15 December 1165 – 18 April 1176, deceased)
- Pietro (December 1176 – 1178, deceased)
- Guillaume aux Blanches Mains (March 1179 – 7 September 1202, deceased)
- Thomas of Capua (13 June 1216 – 22 August 1243, deceased)
- Hughes de Saint-Cher (28 May 1244 – 24 December 1261, named cardinal bishop of Ostia and Velletri)
- Bertrand de Saint–Martin (1273 – 29 March 1277, deceased)
- Hughes Seguin de Billom (16 May 1288 – August 1294), in commendam (August 1294 – 30 December 1298, deceased)
- Niccolò Boccassini (4 December 1298 – 2 March 1300, named cardinal bishop of Ostia and Velletri and later elected as pope)
- William Marsfeld (1303 – 1304, deceased)
- Walter Winterbourne (19 February 1304 – 24 September 1305, deceased)
- Thomas Jorz (15 December 1305 – 13 December 1310, deceased)
- Nicolas Caignet de Fréauville (1310 – 15 January 1323, deceased)
- Gérard Domar (20 September 1342 – 27 September 1343, deceased)
- Jean de la Molineyrie (17 December 1350 – 23 February 1353, deceased)
- Francesco Tebaldeschi (22 September 1368 – 20 August 1378 ?, deceased)
- Giovanni d'Amelia (18 September 1378 – December 1385, deceased)
  - Tommaso di Casasco (30 May 1382 – 17 June 1390, deceased), pseudocardinal of Antipope Clement VII
- Bálint Alsáni (9 February 1385 – 1386, named cardinal priest of Santi Quattro Coronati)
- Giuliano Cesarini (circa 1440 – 7 March 1444, named cardinal bishop of Frascati)
- Giovanni de Primis (16 December 1446 – 21 January 1449, deceased)
- Guillaume-Hugues d'Estaing (12 January 1450 – 28 October 1455, deceased)
- Enea Silvio Piccolomini (18 December 1456 – 19 August 1458 elected pope)
- Berardo Eroli (19 March 1460 – 23 May 1474, named cardinal bishop of Sabina)
- Ausias Despuig (12 December 1477 – 2 September 1483, deceased)
- Giovanni d'Aragona, in commendam (10 September 1483 – 17 October 1485, deceased)
- Vacante (1485 – 1493)
- Jean Bilhères de Lagraulas (23 September 1493 – 6 August 1499, deceased)
- Diego Hurtado de Mendoza y Quiñones (5 October 1500 – 14 October 1502, deceased)
- Francisco Lloris y de Borja, diacon pro illa vice (12 June 1503 – 17 December 1505, named cardinal deacon of Santa Maria Nuova)
- Fazio Giovanni Santori (17 December 1505 – 22 March 1510, deceased)
- René de Prie (17 March 1511 – 24 October 1511 deposto)
- Bandinello Sauli (24 October 1511 – 18 July 1516, named cardinal priest of Santa Maria in Trastevere)
- Giovanni Piccolomini (6 July 1517 – 11 June 1521, named cardinal priest of Santa Balbina)
- Vacante (1521 – 1533)
- Louis II de Bourbon-Vendôme (3 March 1533 – 24 February 1550, named cardinal bishop of Palestrina)
- Ottone di Waldburg (28 February 1550 – 14 April 1561, named cardinal priest of Santa Maria in Trastevere)
- Michele Ghislieri (14 April 1561 – 15 May 1565, named cardinal priest of Santa Maria sopra Minerva and later elected as pope)
- Simone Pasqua (15 May 1565 – 4 September 1565, named cardinal priest of San Pancrazio)
- Stanislaw Hosius (4 September 1565 – 7 September 1565, named cardinal priest pro hac vice of San Teodoro)
- Benedetto Lomellini (7 September 1565 – 24 July 1579, deceased)
- Vincenzo Giustiniani (3 August 1579 – 28 October 1582, deceased)
- Filippo Spinola (20 February 1584 – 20 August 1593, deceased)
- Ottavio Bandini (21 June 1596 – 16 September 1615, named cardinal priest of San Lorenzo in Lucina)
- Giulio Savelli (11 January 1616 – 10 November 1636, named cardinal priest of Santa Maria in Trastevere)
- Francesco Barberini (1645 - 1652)
- Alessandro Bichi (7 December 1637 – 25 May 1657, deceased)
- Scipione Pannocchieschi d'Elci (6 May 1658 – 12 April 1670, deceased)
- Luis Manuel Fernández de Portocarrero (19 May 1670 – 27 January 1698, named cardinal bishop of Palestrina)
- Francesco del Giudice (30 March 1700 – 12 February 1717, named cardinal bishop of Palestrina)
- Mihály Frigyes (Michele Federico) Althan (16 September 1720 – 20 June 1734, deceased)
- Vacante (1734 – 1738)
- Raniero d'Elci (23 July 1738 – 10 April 1747); in commendam (10 April 1747 – 22 June 1761, deceased)
- Vacante (1761 – 1775)
- Leonardo Antonelli (29 May 1775 – 21 February 1794, named cardinal bishop of Palestrina)
- Giulio Maria della Somaglia (22 September 1795 – 20 July 1801, named cardinal priest of Santa Maria sopra Minerva)
- Vacante (1801 – 1818)
- Kasimir Johann Baptist von Häffelin (25 May 1818 – 19 April 1822, named cardinal priest of Sant'Anastasia)
- Luigi Pandolfi (16 May 1823 – 2 February 1824, deceased)
- Vacante (1824 – 1829)
- Gustave-Maximilien-Juste de Croÿ–Solre (21 May 1829 – 1º January 1844, deceased)
- Sisto Riario Sforza (16 April 1846 – 29 September 1877, deceased)
- Vincenzo Moretti (31 December 1877 – 6 October 1881, deceased)
- Edward MacCabe (30 March 1882 – 11 February 1885, deceased)
- Serafino Vannutelli (26 May 1887 – 11 February 1889, named cardinal priest of San Girolamo of Croati)
- Agostino Bausa (14 February 1889 – 15 April 1899, deceased)
- François–Désiré Mathieu (22 June 1899 – 26 October 1908, deceased)
- Léon-Adolphe Amette (30 November 1911 – 29 August 1920, deceased)
- Francisco de Asís Vidal y Barraquer (16 June 1921 – 13 September 1943, deceased)
- Vacante (1942 – 1946)
- Ernesto Ruffini (22 February 1946 – 11 June 1967, deceased)
- Gabriel-Marie Garrone (29 June 1967 – 15 January 1994, deceased)
- Jozef Tomko (29 January 1996 – 8 August 2022, deceased)
- Vacante (2022–present)

== Sources ==
- Krautheimer, Richard (1984). Early Christian and Byzantine Architecture. New Haven: Yale University Press. pp. 171–174. ISBN 978-0-300-05294-7.
- Richard Delbrueck. "Notes on the Wooden Doors of Santa Sabina", The Art Bulletin, Vol. 34, No. 2. (Jun., 1952), pp. 139–145.
- Ernst H. Kantorowicz, "The 'King's Advent': And The Enigmatic Panels in the Doors of Santa Sabina", The Art Bulletin, Vol. 26, No. 4. (Dec., 1944), pp. 207–231.
- Alexander Coburn Soper. "The Italo-Gallic School of Early Christian Art", The Art Bulletin, Vol. 20, No. 2 (Jun., 1938), pp. 145–192.
- Richard Delbrueck. "The Acclamation Scene on the Doors of Santa Sabina" (in Notes), The Art Bulletin, Vol. 31, No. 3 (Sep., 1949), pp. 215–217.
- Allyson E. Sheckler and Mary Joan Winn Leith, “The Crucifixion Conundrum and the Santa Sabina Doors,” Harvard Theological Review 103 (January 2010), pp. 67–88.
- Weitzmann, Kurt, ed., Age of spirituality: late antique and early Christian art, third to seventh century, nos. 247, 438 & 586, 1979, Metropolitan Museum of Art, New York, ISBN 9780870991790; full text available online from The Metropolitan Museum of Art Libraries

Preceded by San Saba, Rome	Landmarks of Rome; Santa Sabina	Succeeded by Sacro Cuore di Maria
