= Robert Blanché =

Robert Blanché (1898–1975) was an associate professor of philosophy at the University of Toulouse. He wrote many books addressing the philosophy of mathematics.

== About Structures intellectuelles ==
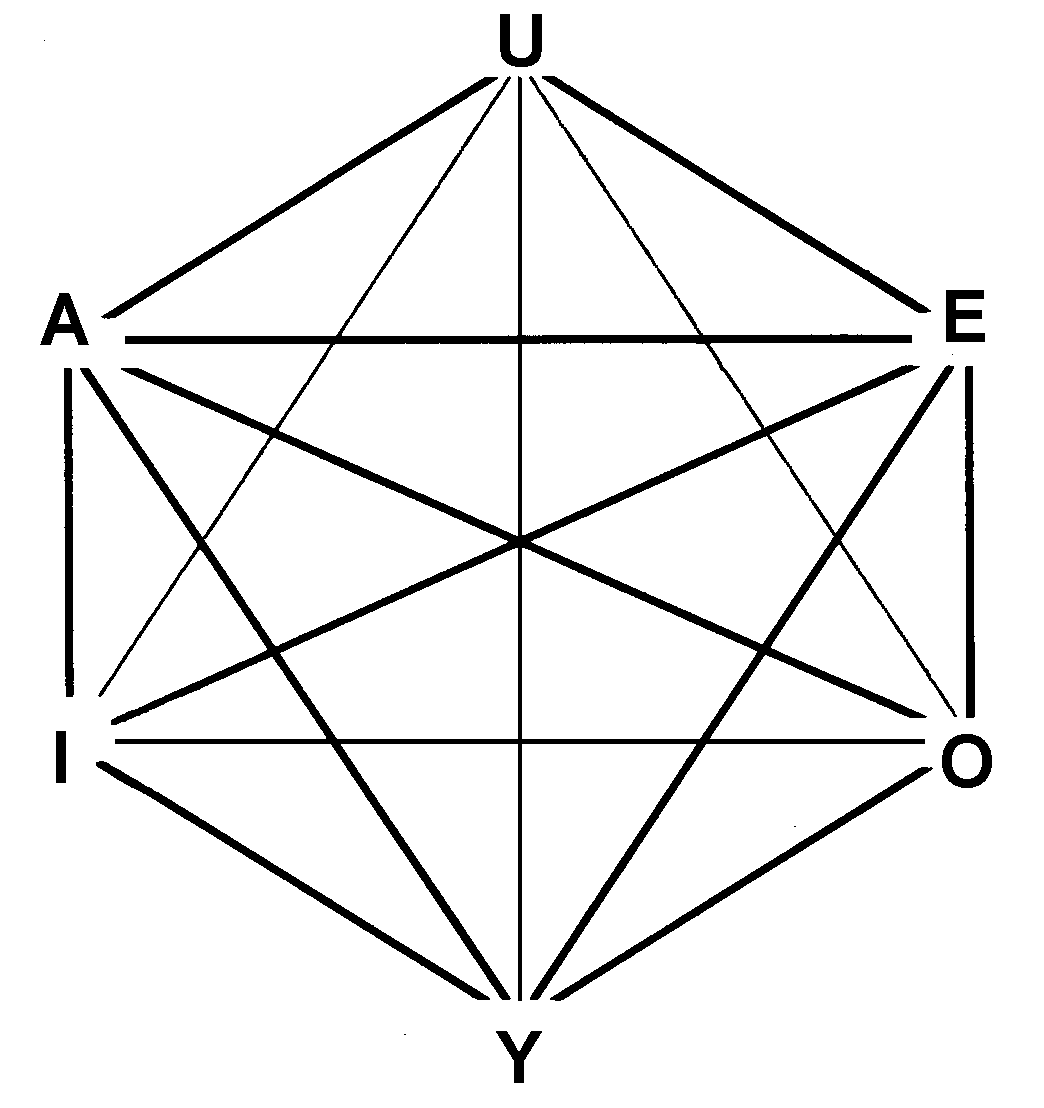
The logical hexagon, co-discovered independently by Blanché and Augustin Sesmat extends the square of opposition to six statements.

Robert Blanché died in 1975. Nine years before, in 1966, he published with Vrin: Structures intellectuelles. Therein, he deals with the logical hexagon. Whereas the logical square or square of Apuleius represents four values: A, E, I, O, the logical hexagon represents six, that is to say, not only A, E, I, O but also two new values: Y and U. It is advisable to read the article: logical hexagon as well what concerns Indian logic.

In La Logique et son histoire d' Aristote à Russell, published with Armand Colin in 1970, Robert Blanché, the author of Structures intellectuelles (Vrin, 1966) mentions that Józef Maria Bocheński speaks of a sort of Indian logical triangle to be compared with the square of Aristotle (or square of Apuleius), in other words with the square of opposition.

== Works ==
- La Notion de fait psychique, essai sur les rapports du physique et du mental – 1934, ed. PUF.
- Le Rationalisme de Whewell – 1935, ed. PUF.
- Whewell : de la construction de la science – 1938, ed. J. Vrin
- La Science physique et la réalité : réalisme, positivisme, mathématisme - 1948, ed. PUF
- Les Attitudes idéalistes – 1949, ed. PUF
- L’Axiomatique – 1955, ed. P.U.F. coll. Quadrige, 112p.
- Introduction à la logique contemporaine - 1957, ed. Armand Colin, coll Cursus, 205p.
- Structures intellectuelles, essai sur l’organisation systématique des concepts - 1966, ed. J. Vrin
- Raison et discours, défense de la logique réflexive – 1967, ed. J. Vrin
- La science actuelle et le rationalisme - 1967, Ed. PUF.
- La Méthode expérimentale et la philosophie de la physique – 1969, ed. Armand Collin, 384p
- La logique et son histoire d’Aristote à Russell, ed. Amand Colin, coll. U, Paris, 1970, 366p.
- La Logique et son histoire, (avec Jacques Dubucs), ed. Amand Colin, coll. U, Paris, 1996, 396p. (édition revue de 1970)
- L’Épistémologie - 1972; ed. PUF
- Le Raisonnement – 1973, ed. PUF
- L’Induction scientifique et les lois naturelles – 1975, ed. PUF
