= Augustin Sesmat =

French mathematician and logician

Augustin Sesmat (April 7, 1885 Dieulouard -- December 12, 1957 (aged 72)) was a French mathematician and logician. He was professor of history and criticism of science at the Institut Catholique de Paris in the 1930s. He was probably the first person to discover the logical hexagon, thus solving a problem posed by Aristotle.

== Works ==
- Le système absolu classique et les mouvements réels, 1936.
- Logique. I. Les définitions, les jugements . ouvrage publiés avec le concours de CNRS, Paris, 1950, 359 pp.
- Logique. II. Les raisonnements, la logistique . Hermann & Cie, Paris,1951, pp. 361–776.
- Dialectique, Hamelin et la philosophie chrétienne, Bloud & Gay, Paris,1955, 38 pp.
