= Saint Sabina =

Roman martyr and saint

Saint Sabina of Rome
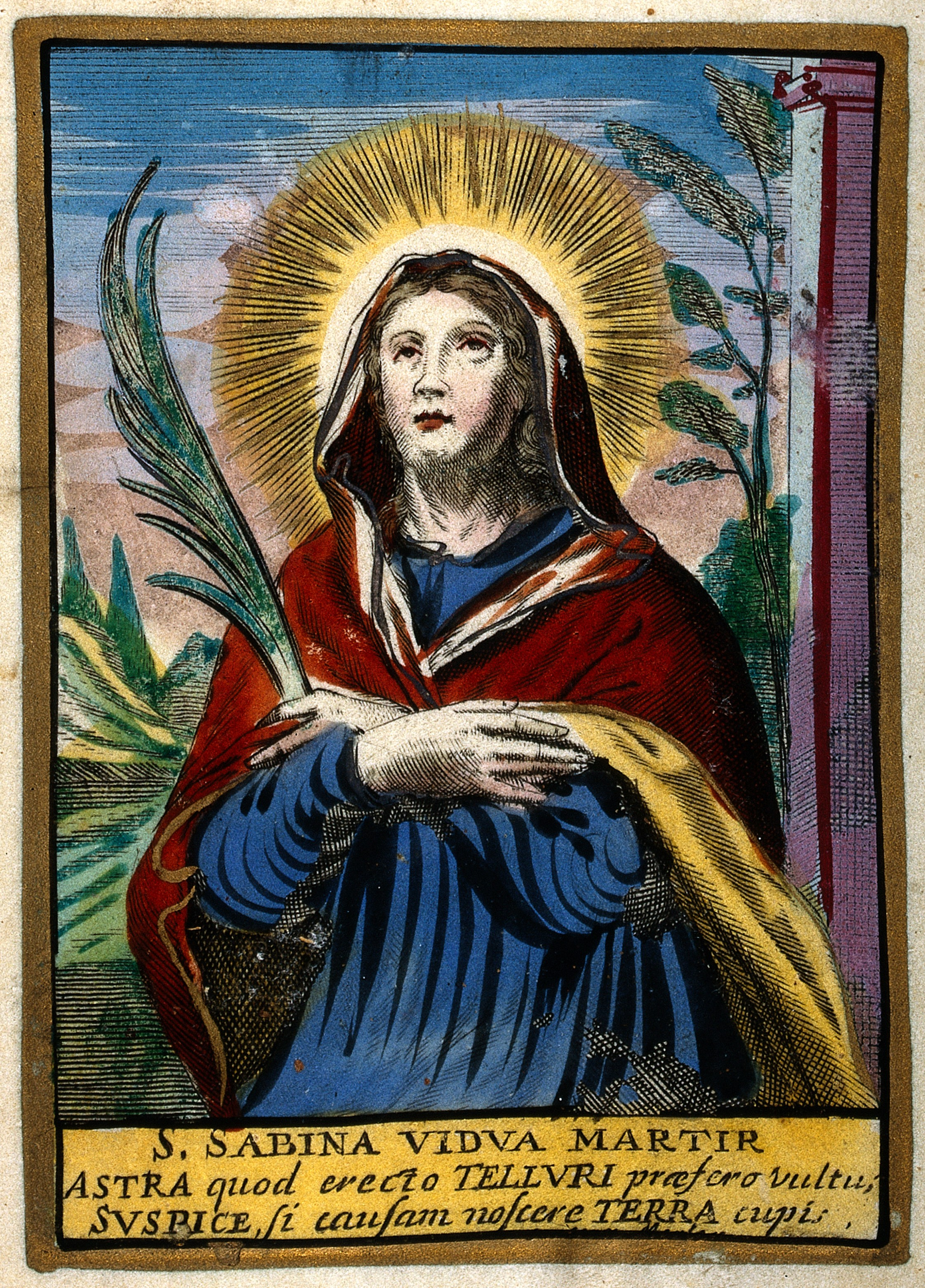

Martyr
- Born: 1st century AD; Rome
- Died: c. 119 / 126; Rome
- Venerated in: Roman Catholic Church; Eastern Orthodox Church
- Canonized: Pre-Congregation
- Major shrine: Santa Sabina on the Aventine Hill, Rome
- Feast: 29 August
- Attributes: book, palm and crown

Sabina of Rome, also known as Saint Sabina or Sabina the Roman (died c. AD 119 or 126) was a Roman Christian who was martyred for her faith. She is venerated as a saint in the Eastern Orthodox Church and Roman Catholic Church, being commemorated on 29 August.

== Biography ==
Sabina was the daughter of Herod Metallarius ("the Metalworker") and the wealthy widow of Senator Valentinus, originally from Avezzano in the region of Abruzzo.

Sabina converted to Christianity due to the example of her Syrian slave Serapia. The widow then withdrew with a few devout friends to one of her country seats, where she spent her time doing good works. Serapia was denounced and beheaded in the city of Vindena in the state of Umbria. Sabina rescued her relics and had them interred in the family mausoleum where she also expected to be buried. Sabina was later denounced as well, and accused of being a Christian by Elpidio the Prefect. She was thereupon martyred in Rome c. AD 126.

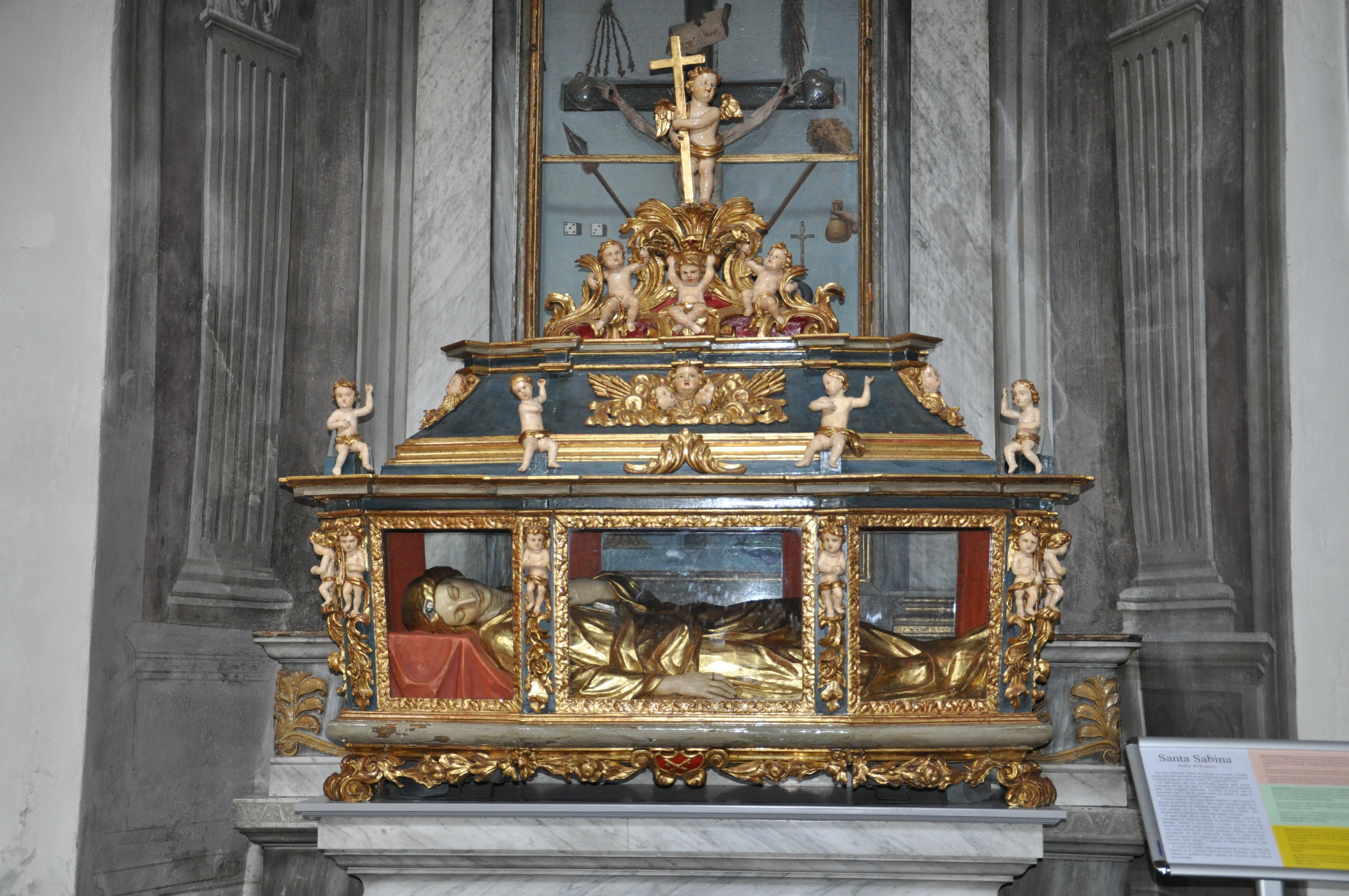
Reliquary of Saint Sabina in the local parish of Santi Pietro e Paolo in Ascona, Switzerland

=== Relics ===
In 430 her relics were translated to the Aventine Hill, to the newly erected basilica Santa Sabina on the site of her house, originally situated near a temple of Juno. This house may also have formed an early Christian titular church. The church was initially dedicated to both Sabina and Serapia.

== Commentary ==
According to Klemens Löffler, writing for the Catholic Encyclopedia, the Acts of the martyrdom have no historic value. Maya Maskarinec suggests that "'Sabina'...was most plausibly the donor who had provided the titulus with property on the Aventine." Often this was a private home to be used as a church. When someone donated property or money, the resulting foundation bore their name. The passio that developed during the sixth to eighth century becomes attached to the memory regarding a late fourth or early fifth century philanthropist. "Gradually, however, throughout Rome, many of the tituli's donors metamorphosed into their communities' patron saints."
