= Landscape with St María de Cervelló =

Painting by Claude Lorrain

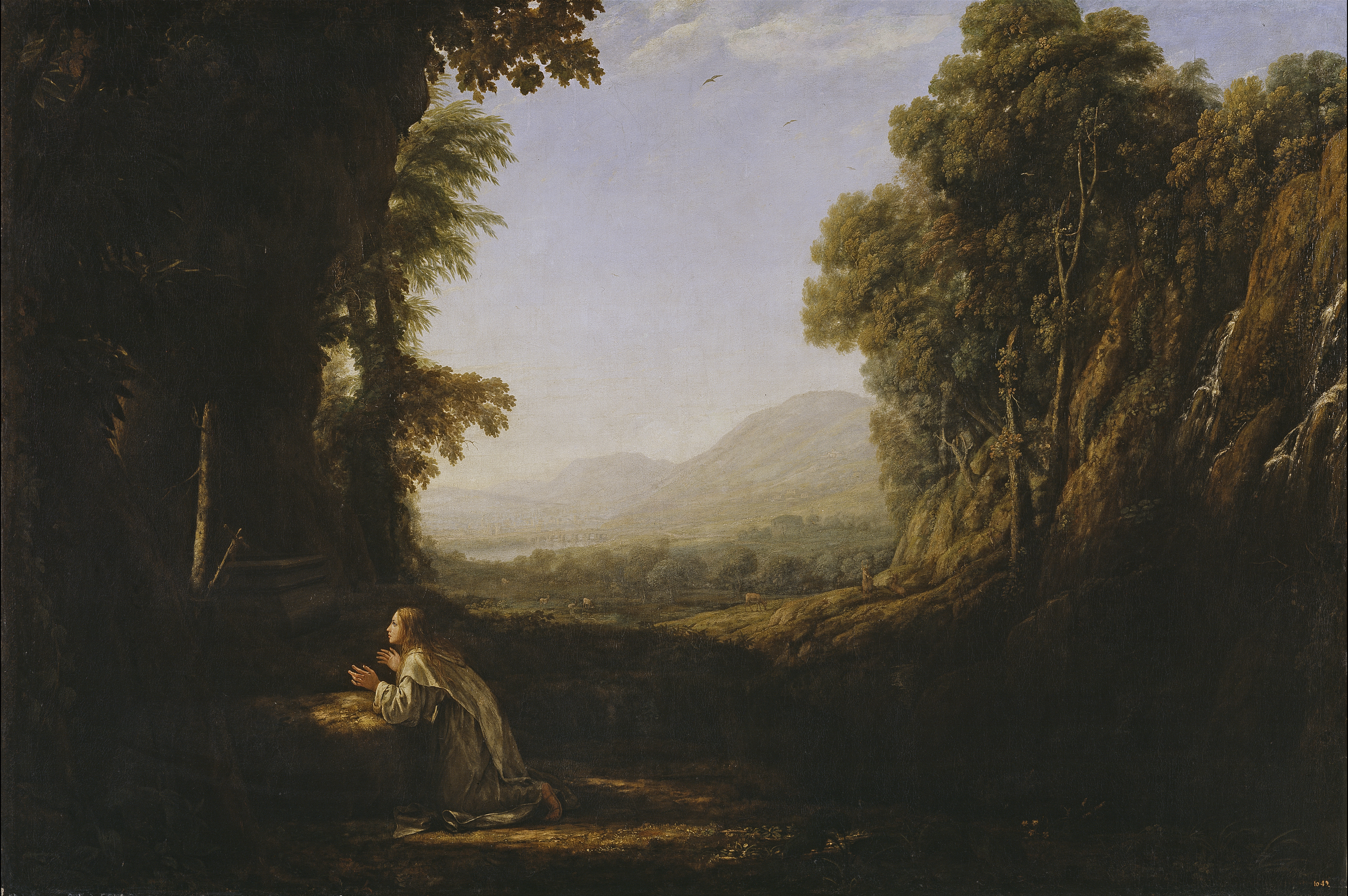

Landscape with St María de Cervelló is a 1637 painting by Claude Lorrain, an early work from a series commissioned from the artist by Philip IV of Spain for the palacio del Buen Retiro. It is now in the Prado Museum in Madrid. It shows the eponymous saint praying in the left foreground.
