= Triangle of opposition =

Concept in Aristotelian logic

In the system of Aristotelian logic, the triangle of opposition is a diagram representing the different ways in which each of the three propositions of the system is logically related ('opposed') to each of the others. The system is also useful in the analysis of syllogistic logic, serving to identify the allowed logical conversions from one type to another.

In the 19th and 20th centuries, other triangles were proposed, including Nicolai A. Vasiliev's triangle, the Jespersenian Triangle, Ginzberg’s triangle of contraries and Sir William Hamilton’s subcontraries.

== See also ==
- Lambda cube
- Logical cube
- Logical hexagon
- Square of opposition
