= Landscape with the Temptation of St Anthony (Lorrain) =

Painting by Claude Lorrain

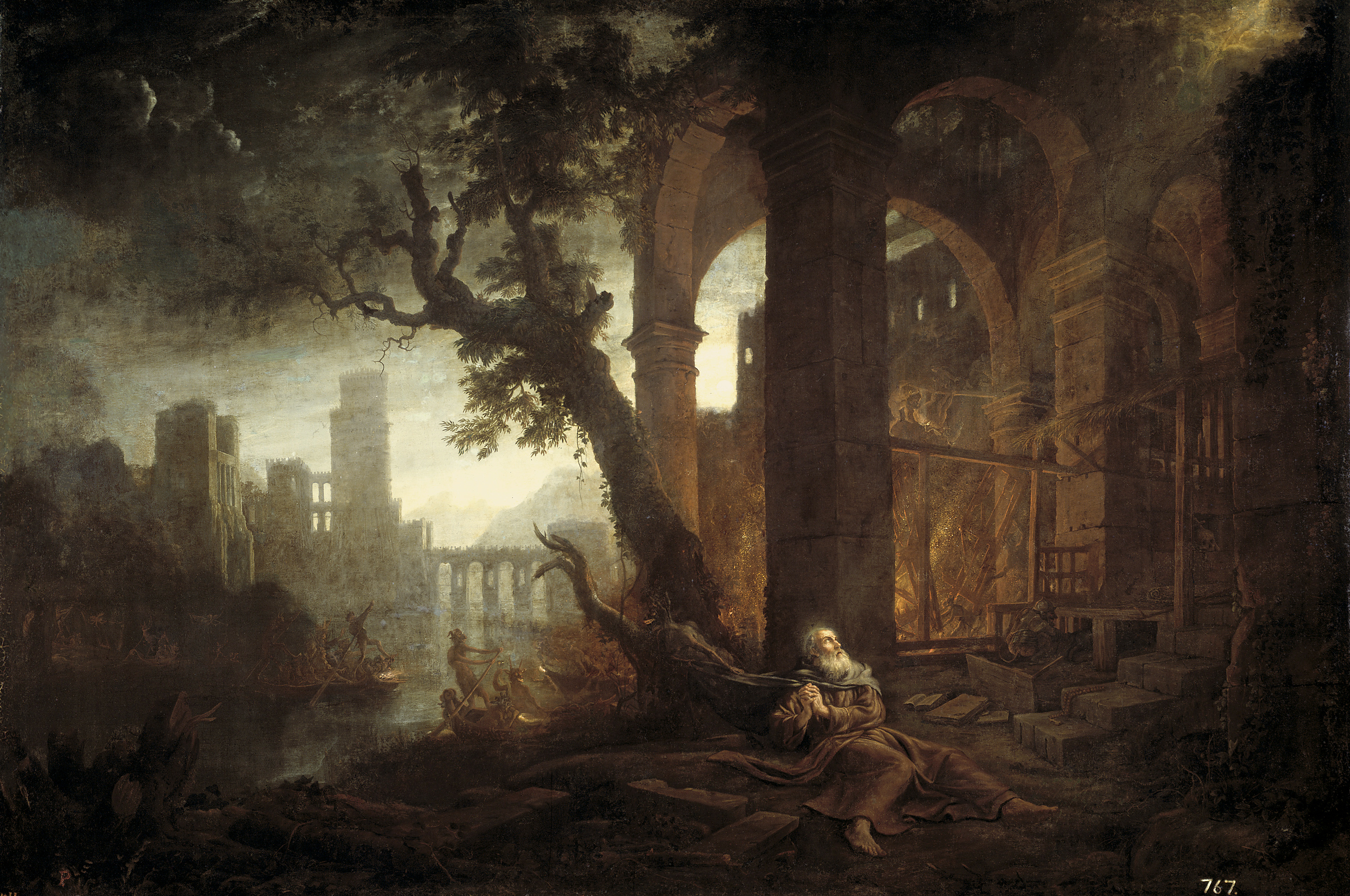
Landscape with the Temptation of St Anthony (1637-1638) by Claude Lorrain

Landscape with the Temptation of St Anthony is a 1637 or 1638 painting by Claude Lorrain, now in the Prado Museum in Madrid. It was one of several paintings commissioned from the artist for the palacio del Buen Retiro.

The saint is depicted among ruins, imploring God to protect him from some small devils who disturb his spiritual retreat. The most striking element in the composition is its sophisticated lighting, which is both compositionally and symbolically complex. As a nocturnal scene, this work is unique within Claude’s oeuvre.
