= Logical cube =

Concept in Aristotelian logic

In the system of Aristotelian logic, the logical cube is a diagram representing the different ways in which each of the eight propositions of the system is logically related ('opposed') to each of the others. The system is also useful in the analysis of syllogistic logic, serving to identify the allowed logical conversions from one type to another.

== See also ==
- Lambda cube
- Logical hexagon
- Square of opposition
- Triangle of opposition
