= Cardinals created by Eugene IV =

Catholic appointments from 1431 to 1446

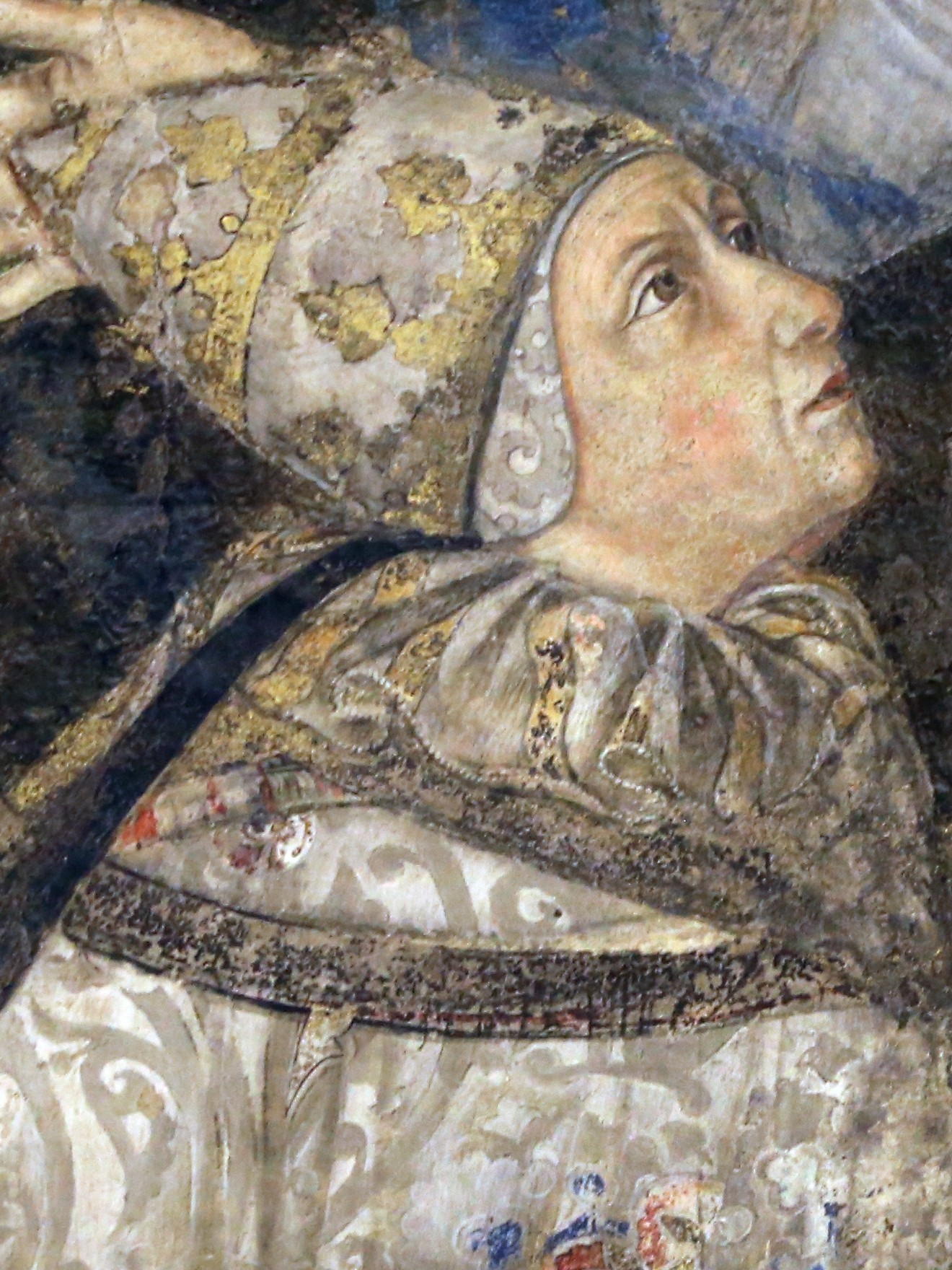
Pope Eugene IV (r. 1417–1447)

Pope Eugene IV (r. 1431–1447) created 27 cardinals in six consistories.

== 19 September 1431 ==
1. Francesco Condulmer, nephew of the Pope – cardinal-priest of S. Clemente, then (1445) cardinal-bishop of Porto, † 30 October 1453
2. Angelotto Fosco, bishop of Cava – cardinal-priest of S. Marco, † 12 September 1444

== 9 August 1437 ==
1. Giovanni Vitelleschi, archbishop of Florence and patriarch of Alexandria – cardinal-priest of S. Lorenzo in Lucina, † 2 April 1440

== 18 December 1439 ==
All the New cardinals received their titles on 8 January 1440.

1. Regnault de Chartres, archbishop of Reims – cardinal-priest of S. Stefano in Montecelio, † 4 April 1444
2. Giovanni Berardi, archbishop of Taranto – cardinal-priest of SS. Nereo ed Achilleo, then cardinal-bishop of Palestrina (7 March 1444), † 21 January 1449
3. John Kemp, archbishop of York – cardinal-priest of S. Balbina, then cardinal-bishop of Santa Rufina (28 July 1452), † 22 March 1454
4. Niccolò d'Acciapaccio, archbishop of Capua – cardinal-priest of S. Marcello, † 3 April 1447
5. Louis de Luxembourg, archbishop of Rouen – cardinal-priest of SS. IV Coronati, † 18 September 1443
6. Giorgio Fieschi, archbishop of Genoa – cardinal-priest of S. Anastasia, then cardinal-bishop of Palestrina (5 March 1449) and cardinal-bishop of Ostia e Velletri (28 April 1455), † 8 October 1461
7. Isidore of Kiev, archbishop of Kiev – cardinal-priest of SS. Marcellino e Pietro, then cardinal-bishop of Sabina (7 February 1451), † 27 April 1463
8. Bessarion, archbishop of Nicea – cardinal-priest of SS. XII Apostoli, then cardinal-bishop of Sabina (5 March 1449), cardinal-bishop of Tusculum (23 April 1449) and again cardinal-bishop of Sabina (14 October 1468), † 18 November 1472
9. Gerardo Landriani Capitani, bishop of Como – cardinal-priest of S. Maria in Trastevere, † 9 October 1445
10. Zbigniew Oleśnicki, bishop of Kraków – cardinal-priest of S. Prisca; then cardinal-priest of S. Anastasia in the obedience of the Council of Basle (1441 until 6 July 1447), and again cardinal-priest of S. Prisca (6 September 1447), † 1 April 1455
11. António Martins de Chaves, bishop of Porto – cardinal-priest of S. Crisogono, † 6 July 1447
12. Petrus von Schaumberg, bishop of Augsburg – cardinal-priest of S. Vitale, † 12 April 1469
13. Jean Le Jeune, bishop of Terouanne – cardinal-priest of S. Prassede, then cardinal-priest of S. Lorenzo in Lucina (1441), † 9 September 1451
14. Dénes Szécsi, bishop of Eger – cardinal-priest of S. Ciriaco, † 1 February 1465
15. Guillaume d'Estouteville, elect of Angers – cardinal-priest of SS. Silvestro e Martino, then cardinal-priest of S. Pudenziana (1459), cardinal-bishop of Porto e Santa Rufina (1459) and cardinal-bishop of Ostia e Velletri (26 October 1461), † 22 January 1483
16. Juan de Torquemada, O.P. – cardinal-priest of S. Sisto, then cardinal-priest of S. Maria in Trastevere (1446), cardinal-bishop of Sabina (5 May 1463), † 26 September 1468
17. Alberto Alberti, elect of Camerino – cardinal-deacon of S. Eustachio, † 3 August 1445

== 1 July 1440 ==
1. Ludovico Trevisan, patriarch of Aquileia – cardinal-priest of S. Lorenzo in Damaso, then cardinal-bishop of Albano (7 January 1465), † 22 March 1465
2. Pietro Barbo, nephew of the Pope – cardinal-deacon of S. Maria Nuova, then cardinal-priest of S. Marco (16 June 1451), became Pope Paul II on 30 August 1464, † 26 July 1471

== 2 May 1444 ==
1. Alfonso de Borja, bishop of Valencia – cardinal-priest of SS. IV Coronati (received the title on 12 July 1444), became Pope Callixtus III on 8 April 1455, † 6 August 1458

== 16 December 1446 ==
1. Enrico Rampini, archbishop of Milan – cardinal-priest of S. Clemente, † 4 July 1450
2. Tommaso Parentucelli, bishop of Bologna – cardinal-priest of S. Susanna (received the title on 23 December 1446), became Pope Nicholas V on 6 March 1447, † 24 March 1455
3. Juan Carvajal, elect of Placencia – cardinal-deacon of S. Angelo (received the title on 23 December 1446), then cardinal-bishop of Porto e Santa Rufina (26 October 1461), † 6 December 1469
4. Giovanni de Primis, O.S.B. – cardinal-priest of S. Sabina, † 21 January 1449

== Bibliography ==
- Miranda, Salvador. "Consistories for the creation of Cardinals 12th Century (1099-1198): Eugenius IV (1431-1447)". The Cardinals of the Holy Roman Church. Florida International University. OCLC 53276621.
- Konrad Eubel, Hierarchia Catholica, vol. II, Padua 1914 – 1960
