= Antonio Pacini da Todi =

Italian Renaissance humanist and translator (died 1489)

Antonio Pacini da Todi or Tudertino (died 1489) was an Italian humanist and translator.

== Life ==
Pacini was born in Castelvecchio di Todi in the first two decades of the 15th century. He moved to Florence, where he studied under Francesco Filelfo and tutored Giovanni di Cosimo de' Medici. He lived in the Medici palace between 1438 and 1441, during which time he survived a bout of malaria. He also worked for the Curia Romana. In 1441–1442, he was the secretary of Cardinal Nicola Acciapaccia.

In 1442–1443, Pacini lectured on poetry and rhetoric at the Studio Fiorentino. He continued to be attached to the Studio down to 1450, when he moved to Todi. In Todi, he founded the Accademia dei Convivanti and became a tutor for Bartolomeo d'Alviano. He died in Todi in 1489 and was buried there in the church of Saint Nicholas.

== Works ==
Pacini translated six of the biographies in Plutarch's Parallel Lives from Greek into Latin:

- Marcus Furius Camillus, dedicated to Lorenzo de' Medici (1435)
- Timoleon, dedicated to Cosimo de' Medici (after 1435)
- Gaius Marius, dedicated to Ludovico Scarampi Trevisan (1437–1439)
- Fabius Maximus, dedicated to Jean Le Jeune (1439–1451)
- Theseus, dedicated to Nicola Acciapaccia (1440–1441)
- Pelopidas, dedicated to Giuliano Cesarini (1442–1444)

He was introduced to Humphrey, Duke of Gloucester, by Zanone Castiglioni and sometime between 1442 and 1447 sent him a copy of his translation of the biography of Marius. In 1470, Ulrich Han published his translations as part of the first printing of Plutarch's Lives. His translations were not always well received. They were criticized by Filelfo, Giacomo Ammannati, Paolo Cortesi, Marcantonio Sabellico and Desiderius Erasmus. His other translations from Greek include poems 1, 2 and 10 of Gregory of Nazianzus, dedicated to Pope Eugene IV in 1439, and two works of Lucian of Samosata: De sacrificiis, dedicated to Ridolfo Lotti, and De laudibus patriae, dedicated to Piero de' Pazzi.

Pacini's other writings include a funeral oration for Lorenzo de' Medici, Oratio in funere Laurentii de Medicis, written on the day of his death (23 September 1440) and sent to Cesarini. He wrote a consolatory letter to Acciapaccia on the death of the latter's brother, Consolatio ad cardinalem Capuanum in obitum fratris sui. During his time in Florence, he wrote an urban encomium, Oratio in laudem Florentiae.

== Bibliography ==
- Davies, Jonathan (1998). Florence and its University during the Early Renaissance. Brill.
- Lucioli, Francesco (2014). "Pacini, Antonio". Dizionario Biografico degli Italiani (in Italian). Vol. 80: Ottone–Pansa. Rome: Istituto dell'Enciclopedia Italiana. ISBN 978-88-12-00032-6.
- Pade, Marianne (2007). The Reception of Plutarch's Lives in Fifteenth-century Italy. Vol. 1. Museum Tusculanum Press.
- Park, Katharine (1980). "The Readers at the Florentine Studio according to Communal Fiscal Records (1357–1380, 1413–1446)". Rinascimento. n.s. 20: 249–310.
