= Louis Aleman =

French Roman Catholic cardinal

Cardinal Louis Aleman C.R.S.J.
- Archbishop of Arles
- Church: Roman Catholic Church
- See: Arles
- Appointed: 3 December 1423
- Installed: 16 May 1424
- Term ended: 11 April 1440
- Predecessor: Paul de Sade
- Successor: Philippe de Lévis
- Other posts: Cardinal-Priest of Santa Cecilia (1449-50); Protopriest of the College of Cardinals (1449-50)
- Previous posts: Bishop of Maguelonne (1418-23); Legate to Siena (1422); Governor of the Romagna (1424-26); Cardinal-Priest of Santa Cecilia (1426-50); Legate to Bologna (1426-28); Camerlengo of the College of Cardinals (1427-31)

Orders
- Consecration: 20 November 1418 by Pope Martin V
- Created cardinal: 24 May 1426 by Pope Martin V
- Rank: Cardinal-Priest

Personal details
- Born: Louis Aleman c. February 1390 Arbent, Bugey, Kingdom of France
- Died: 16 September 1450 (aged 60) Arles, Kingdom of France

Sainthood
- Feast day: 16 September
- Venerated in: Roman Catholic Church
- Beatified: 9 April 1527; Old Saint Peter's Basilica, Papal States by Pope Clement VII
- Attributes: Cardinal's attire

Louis Aleman (c. February 1390 – 16 September 1450) was a French Roman Catholic cardinal and a professed member of the now-suppressed Canons Regular of Saint John Baptist. He served as the Archbishop of Arles from 1423 until his resignation in 1440 when he had resigned from the cardinalate. But he was later reinstated as a cardinal on 19 December 1449 at which point he served as the Protopriest and also reclaimed his titular church.

Aleman served as the Bishop of Maguelonne from 1418 until his archepiscopal elevation at which point he was later named a cardinal. Aleman once led opposition to Pope Eugene IV while pledging allegiance to an antipope which led to Eugene IV stripping Aleman of all ecclesiastical dignities that he had been entitled to. But he later convinced the antipope to abdicate as a means of ending the Western Schism at which stage Aleman was restored to the cardinalate and returned to full communion with the Roman see under Pope Nicholas V. He has often been dubbed as the "Cardinal of Arles".

His beatification received approval on 9 April 1527 from Pope Clement VII.

== Life ==
Louis Aleman was born to nobles circa 1390 at the castle in Arbent to Jean Aleman and Marie de Châtillon de Michaille. His archbishop grand-uncle was François de Conzie (c.1356-31.12.1431/2).

He was present at the Council of Pisa in 1409. He studied canon law and graduated in that area with a doctorate in 1414 at the college in Avignon. In 1417 he was made the abbot commendatario of Saint-Pierre de la Tour.

Aleman served as the governor of the Romagna since 1424 and had to face the ongoing struggles between the Guelphs and the Ghibellines in Bologna. One of the Guelph families - the Canetols - even imprisoned Aleman for several weeks but Aleman was later released and moved to Rome to serve in the court of Pope Martin V. Aleman served as a noted advisor to the pope and also served as a courtier while in the papal court. He had served in the papal court for Martin V since July 1417.

On 22 June 1418 he was appointed as the Bishop of Maguelonne and he was installed into his new see on 17 May 1419. The pope himself granted episcopal consecration to Aleman in Mantua. He later became a diplomat to Siena in 1422. Aleman was later promoted as the newest Archbishop of Arles on 3 December 1423 and was installed in that see on 16 May 1424. Martin V named him a cardinal on 24 May 1426 as the Cardinal-Priest of Santa Cecilia - he received that title on 27 May. From 1427 until 1431 he served as the Camerlengo for the College of Cardinals. He served as a legate to Bologna from 1426 to 1428 and did not participate in the conclave of 1431.

He was a prominent member of the Council of Basel since 1432 and together with Cardinal Julian Cesarini led the forces that maintained the power of the general councils over the pope's own control of the Church. It was while the council was proceeding that he tended to victims of the plague. He later led opposition to the pope but Cesarini was reconciled with Pope Eugene IV and had a prominent part in the pope's convoked Council of Florence. In 1439 he led the effort to depose Eugene IV and the election of a successor. In 1440 he placed the tiara upon Antipope Felix V and consecrated him as a bishop. This was a misguided attempt at reforming the Church which Aleman believed was vital. Eugene IV was responded to this and excommunicated the antipope while also depriving Aleman of all his ecclesiastical dignities. This also meant that Aleman could no longer be considered a cardinal and he was deprived of the dignities that came with the cardinalate. This occurred on 11 April 1440: he was stripped of Arles as his archdiocese and was stripped of his titular church.

Antipope Felix V made him the legate to the Diet of Frankfurt to the court of Emperor Friedrich III. He was further involved in the unsuccessful efforts to win over Europe's princes to Basel's antipope. In order to make an end of the schism the former cardinal advised Felix V to abdicate at which stage Pope Nicholas V restored the cardinal to all his honors and appointed him as a papal legate to the German kingdom] in 1449; his full restoration was on 19 December 1449. He was granted back his titular church as well and from that moment until his death served as the Protopriest of the College of Cardinals. It was due to his estrangement to the Roman see that he was not permitted to participate in the conclave of 1447. He returned to his former archdiocese where he dedicated himself with great zeal to the catechetical formation of the people.

He died on 16 September 1450 at the Franciscan convent in Salon at Arles. Aleman's remains are housed in Saint-Trophine d'Arles.

== Beatification ==
His beatification was approved and celebrated on 9 April 1527 after Pope Clement VII confirmed that there had been a longstanding and popular cultus (otherwise known as an enduring public veneration) of the late cardinal.

== Notes and references ==
Attribution:
