= Portrait of Cardinal Ludovico Trevisan =

Painting by Andrea Mantegna

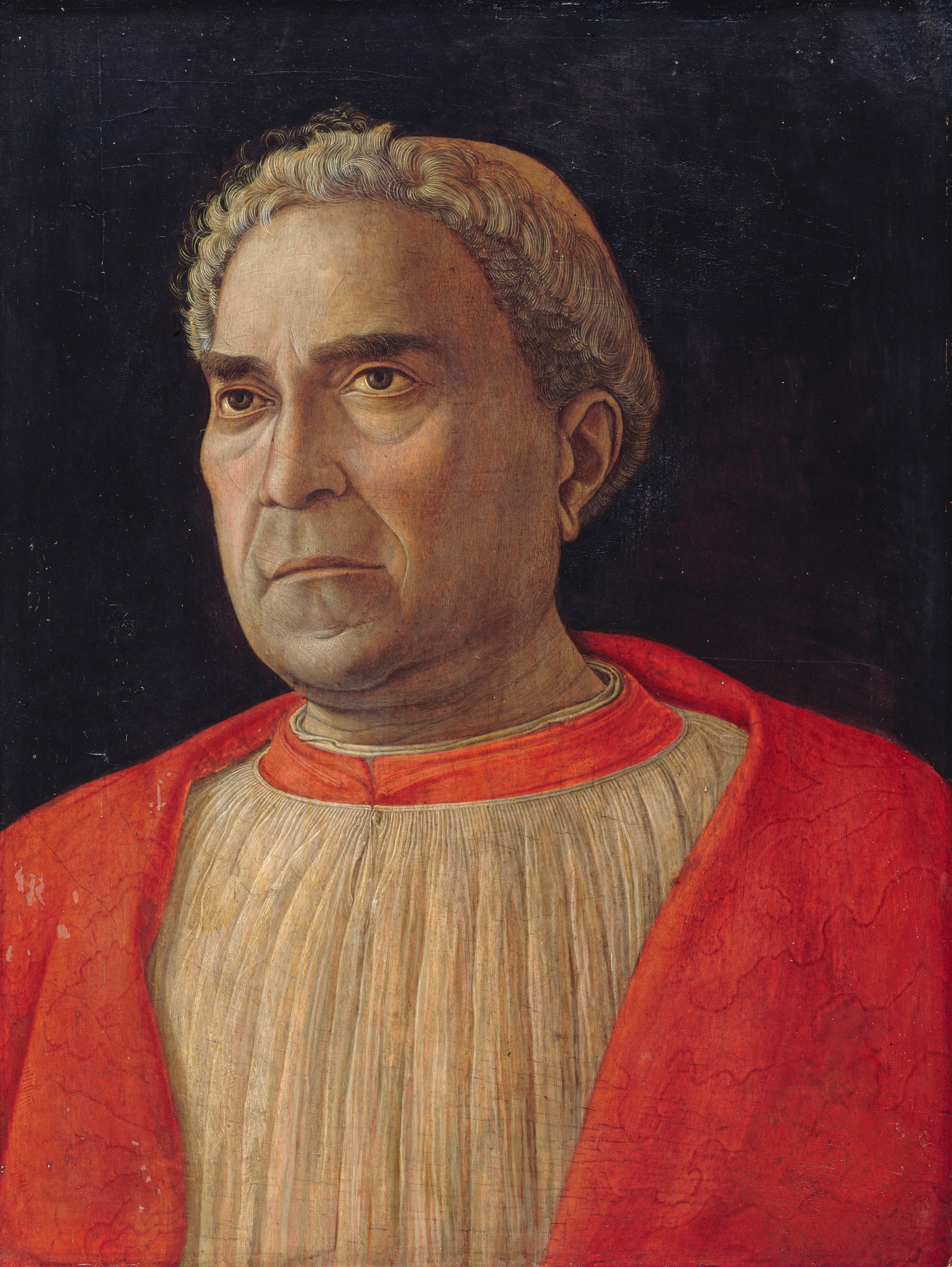
- Artist: Andrea Mantegna
- Year: 1459–1460
- Medium: Tempera on panel
- Dimensions: 44.8 cm × 33.9 cm (17.6 in × 13.3 in)
- Location: Gemäldegalerie, Berlin

The Portrait of Cardinal Ludovico Trevisan is a painting by the Italian Renaissance artist Andrea Mantegna, dated to c. 1459–1460. It is currently part of the collection of the Gemäldegalerie, Berlin.

== History ==
The identification of the painting's subject as the Venetian cardinal Ludovico Trevisan is confirmed by several copies of the work, as that once in the Bromley Davenport Collection including the man's name, titles and coat of arms, as well as by a medal attributed to Cristoforo di Geremia or an etching included in the 1630 Illustrium virorum elogia, where it is also specified that the portrait belonged to Francesco Leone of Padua.

Cardinal Trevisan, later also known as Scarampi Mezzarota, took part in the council of Mantua in 1459: the portrait was commissioned from Mantegna when the artist was still in Padua, shortly before he established himself in Mantua.

== Description ==
The cardinal is portrayed from in a three-quarter position over a dark background, with strong chiaroscuro effects which enhance the volume of the figure, turning it into a kind of Roman-style bust in painting.

The serious and concentrated glance and the detail of the closed lips underline the strong character of the man, who was not only a politician and diplomat, but also a war leader. Mantegna gave a notable attention not only to the details of the face (lips, wrinkles, the clerical tonsure), but also to the garments, indicating his high social status.

== Sources ==
- La Grande Storia dell'Arte - Il Quattrocento, Il Sole 24 Ore, 2005
- Kleiner, Frank S. Gardner's Art Through the Ages, 13th Edition, 2008
- Manca, Joseph. Andrea Mantegna and the Italian Renaissance, 2006
