= Alberto Alberti (cardinal) =

Italian cardinal (1386-1445)

Alberto Alberti (1386 – 11 August 1445) was an Italian Cardinal of the 15th century .

== Biography ==
He was born in 1386, in Florence. Belonging to the Florentine Alberti family, he was the son of Giovanni di Cipriano Alberti.

He was Apostolic prothonotary and Governor of Perugia. On 4 March 1437, he was appointed Apostolic administrator of the Diocese of Camerino and on 6 October of the same year he was consecrated Bishop of Perugia.

He was appointed Cardinal on 18 December 1439 by Pope Eugene IV and received the title of Cardinal Deacon of Sant'Eustachio.

In 1440, he was papal legate in Sicily to reconcile Duke René of Anjou and King Alfonso V of Aragon.

In 1444, he became Camerlengo of the Sacred College from October 1444. He was one of the Cardinals responsible for the canonization of Bernardino of Siena. He died on 11 August 1445 in Grottaferrata.

== See also ==
- Cardinals created by Eugene IV

Catholic Church titles
Preceded by Giovanni Berardi	Camerlengo of the Sacred College of Cardinals; 1444-1445	Succeeded by Pietro Barbo
