= Palazzo Malenchini Alberti =

Coordinates: 43°46′1.47″N 11°15′32.31″E

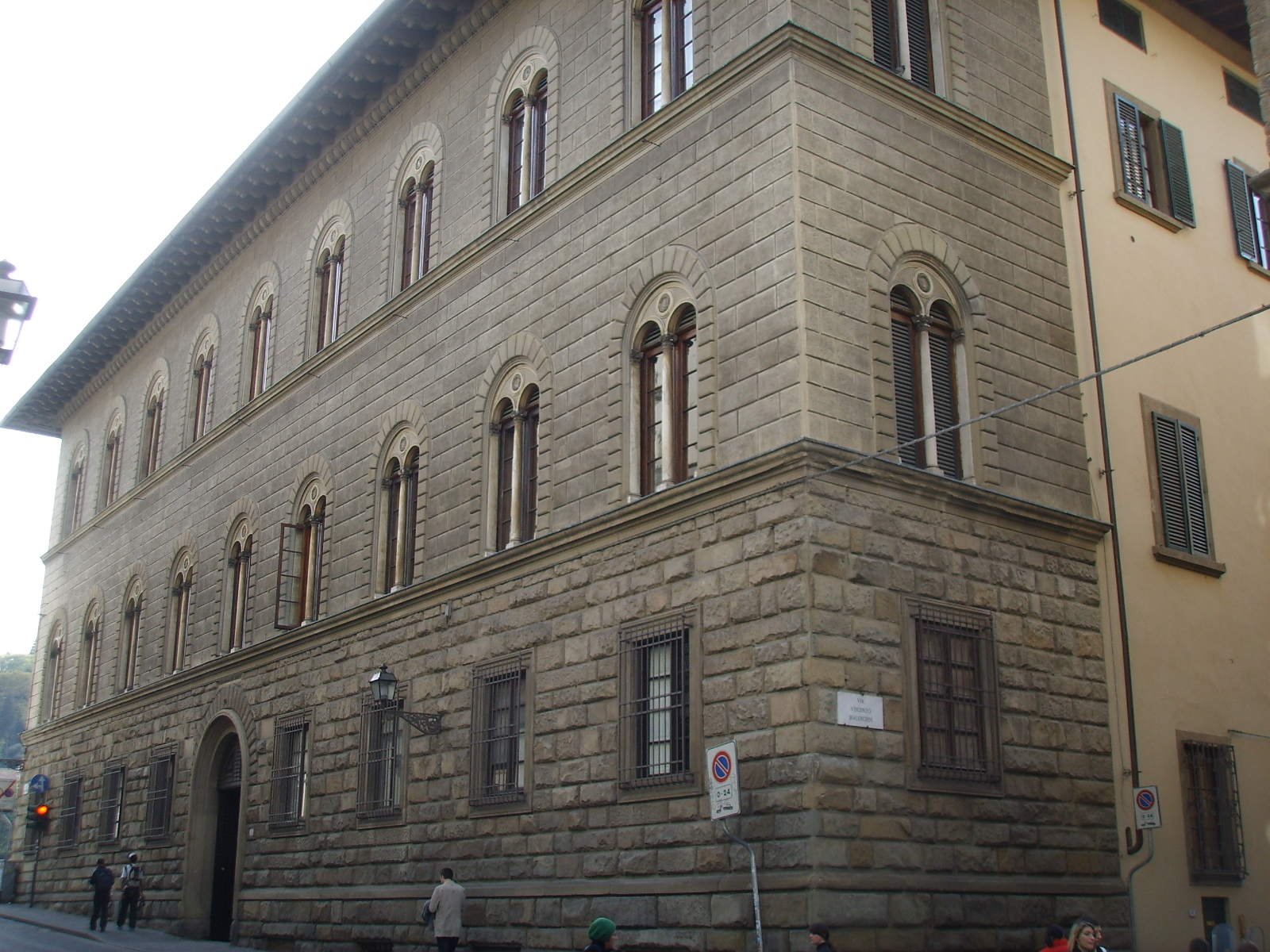
Palazzo Malenchini Alberti seen from Via de' Benci.

Palazzo Malenchini Alberti is a palace in Florence, Italy. It was owned by the Alberti, who also had a tower nearby.

== History ==
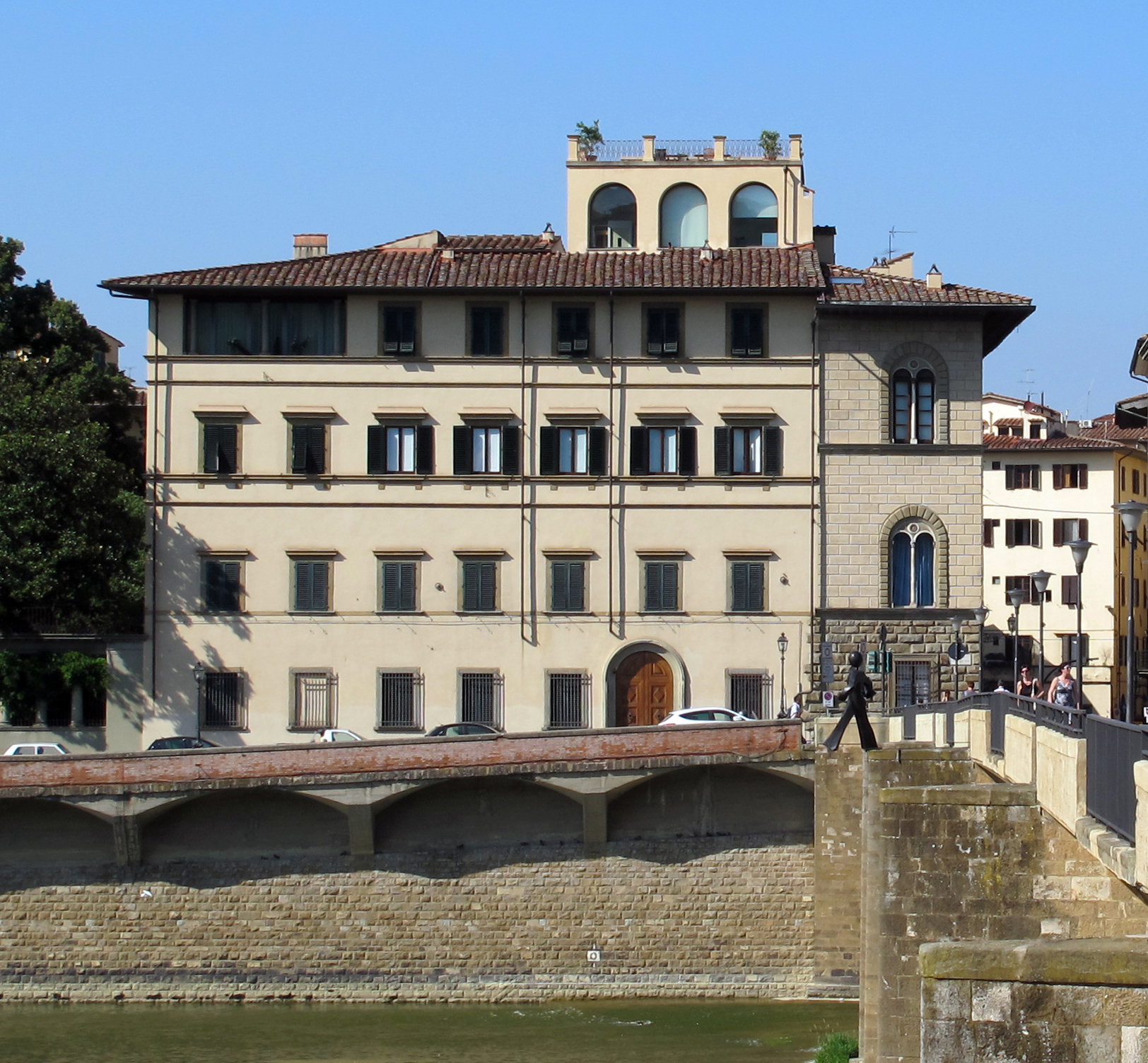
View from across the Arno River

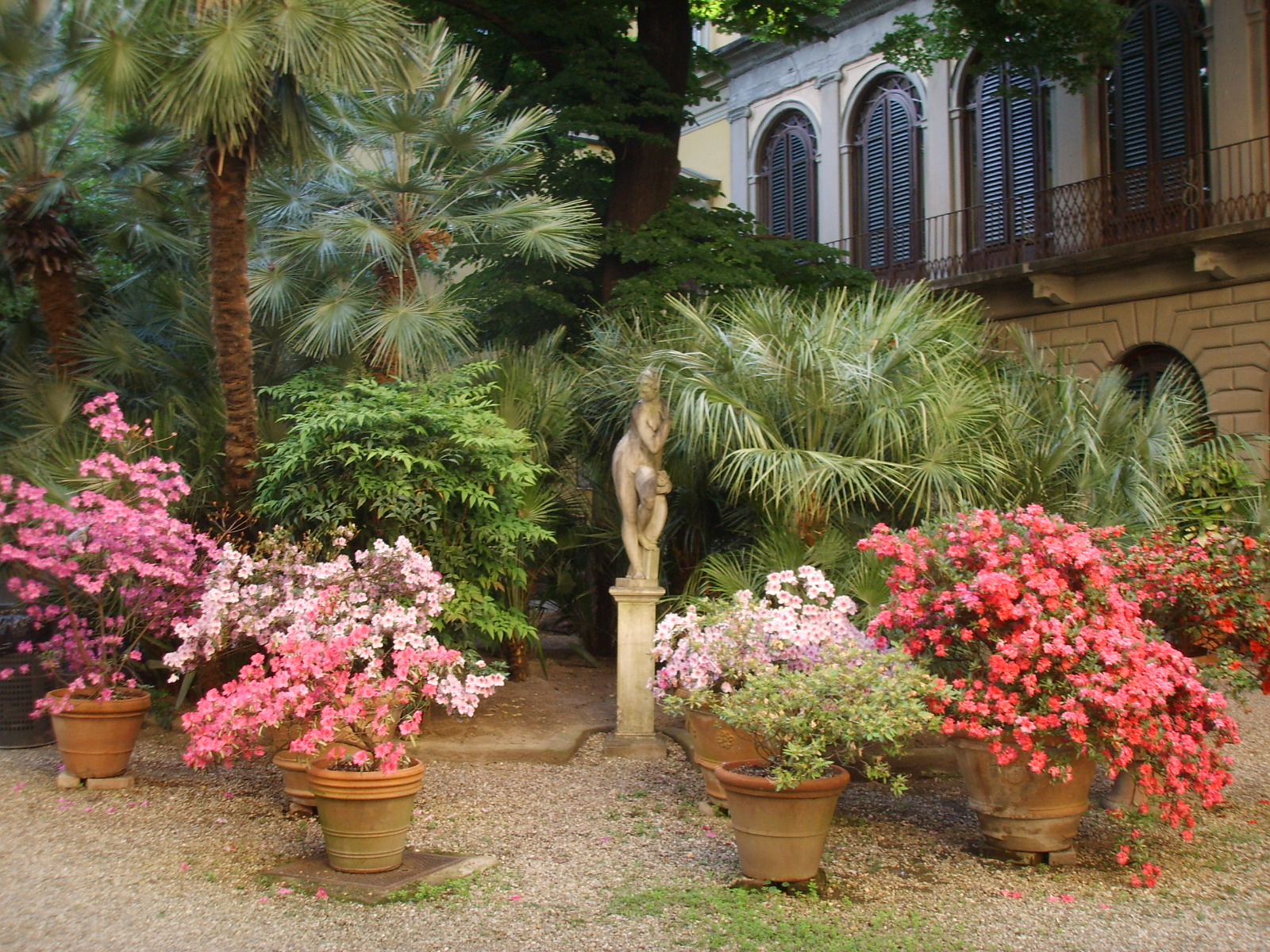
View of the garden

Until the 15th century, their residence was formed by a series of different houses and workshops, which were unified between 1760 and 1763 under Count Giovan Vincenzo Alberti (1715-1788), a Florentine senator and minister to both Grand-Dukes Francis I and his son Peter Leopold. Count Alberti's son, Leon Battista Alberti, died without heirs in 1836 and the palace passed to a nephew belonging to the Mori Ubaldini family.

Between 1838 and 1839, the Ubaldini's renovated the palace, under the direction of the architect Vittorio Bellini. A new neo-Renaissance façade and a loggia on the northern side of the palace's garden were added between 1849 and 1851 by the architects Odoardo Razzi and Niccolò Salvi. In 1878, the palace was bought at auction by the Duke of Chaulnes (grandson of Honoré Théodoric d'Albert de Luynes, Duke of Luynes), distant descendants of the Alberti. The Duke died in 1881 and his son and widow left Florence in 1887, after which the palace was sold in 1895 to Marquis Luigi Malenchini from Livorno, whence the modern name was derived.

=== Present day ===
The palace was damaged during World War II and by the 1966 Flood of the River Arno. It was later restored between 2000 to 2003.
