= Cardinal of Capua =

Cardinal of Capua may refer to:

- Nicolò Acciapacci (died 1447)
- Juan López (died 1501)
