= Antonio Pacini =

Antonio Pacini may refer to:

- Antonio Pacini da Todi (died 1489), Renaissance humanist and translator
- Antonio Pacini (composer) (1778–1866), Italian composer
