= 1447 conclave =

Election of Catholic Pope Nicholas V

Papal conclave March 1447

Dates and location
- 4–6 March 1447; Santa Maria sopra Minerva, Papal States

Key officials
- Dean: Giovanni Berardi
- Sub-dean: Francesco Condulmer
- Camerlengo: Ludovico Trevisan
- Protopriest: Henry Beaufort
- Protodeacon: Prospero Colonna

Election
- Candidates: Prospero Colonna

Elected pope
- Tommaso Parentucelli; Name taken: Nicholas V
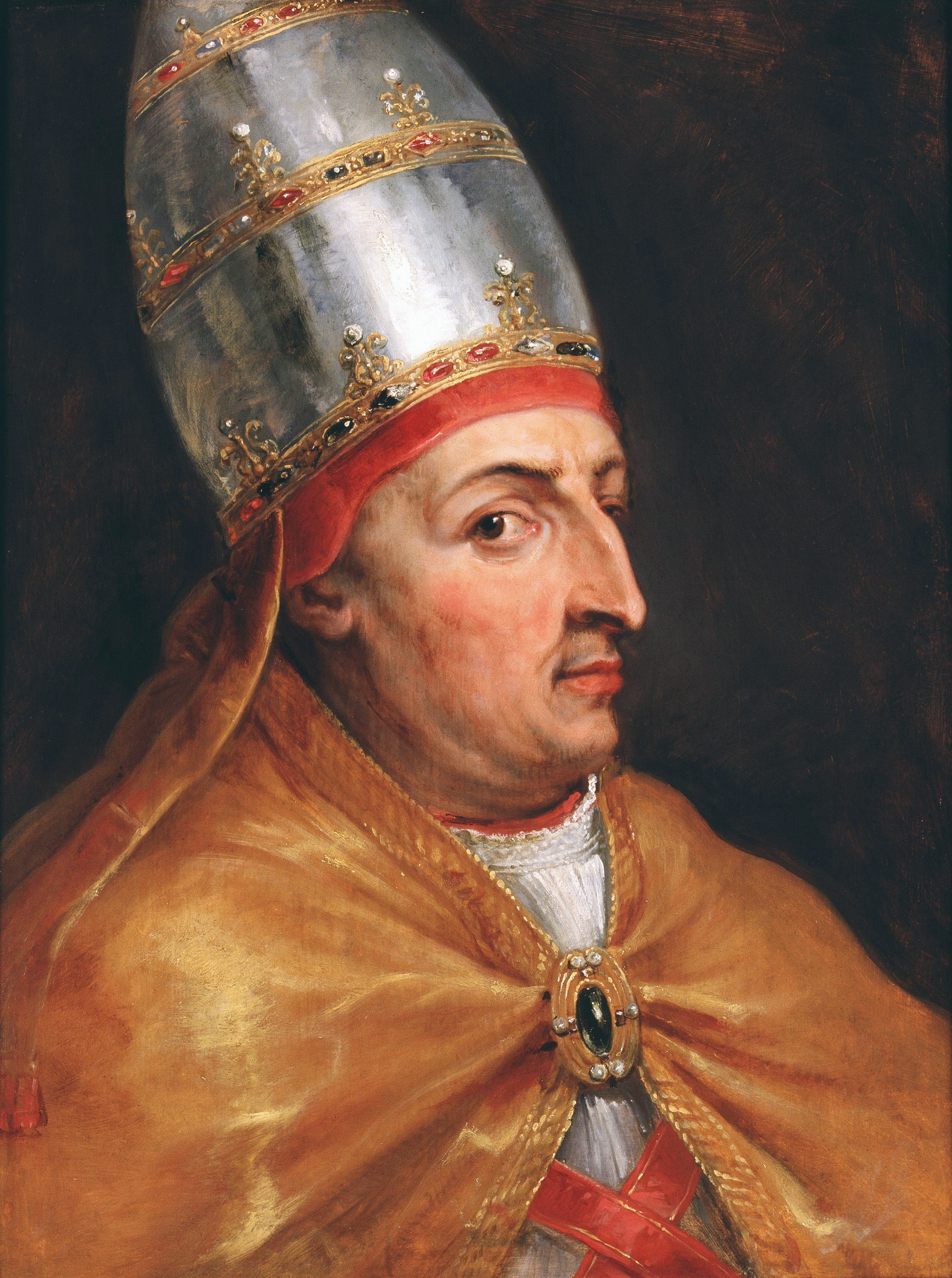

The 1447 papal conclave (4–6 March), meeting in the Roman basilica of Santa Maria sopra Minerva, elected Pope Nicholas V (Tommaso Parentucelli) to succeed Pope Eugene IV (Gabriele Condulmer).

== Balloting ==
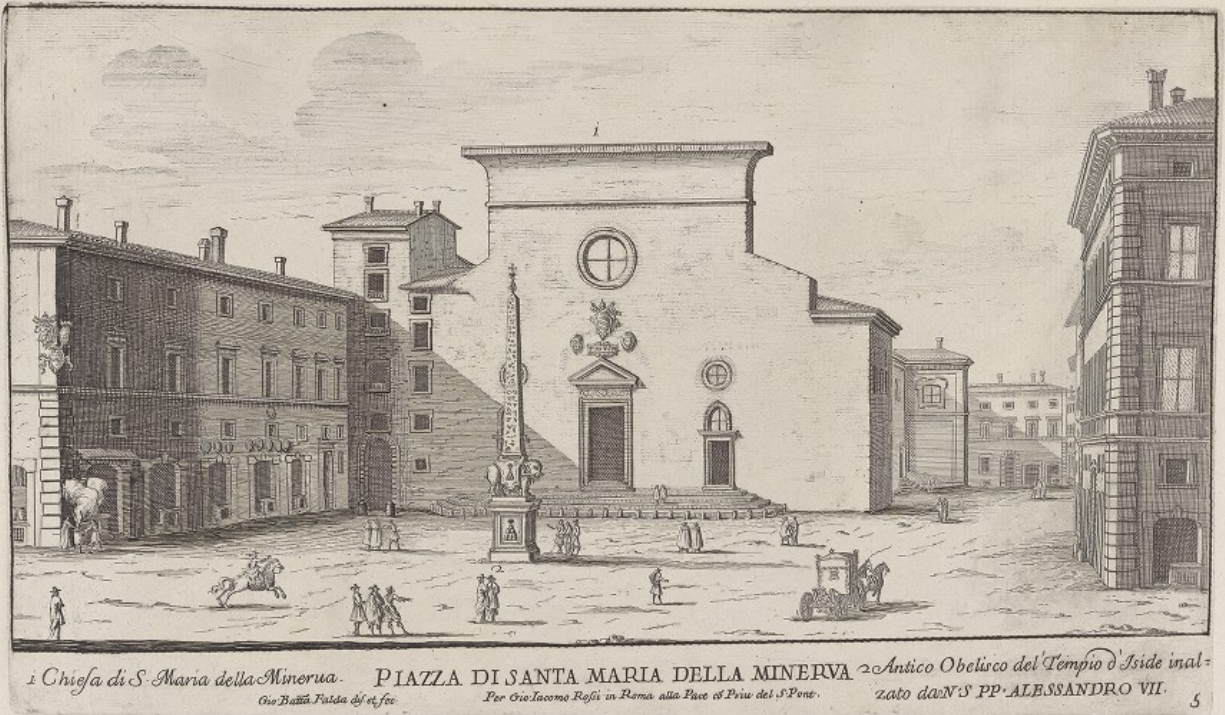
Santa Maria sopra Minerva, site of the 1447 conclave. (1665 drawing; the obelisk at centre was added in the 17th century)

Eugene IV had died on 23 February 1447. The cardinals entered conclave at the time of Vespers (sunset) on 4 March, after waiting the full nine days proscribed by Ubi periculum. Of the twenty-four cardinals living, only eighteen were present in Rome for the conclave. The conclave, like its predecessor which had elected Eugene IV, was held in the Sacristy of the Dominican friars of Santa Maria sopra Minerva, even though many members of the College of Cardinals would have preferred to relocate to the Vatican.

Several Roman barons, most prominent among them Gio Baptista Savelli, insisted for a time on being able to vote in the conclave (although perhaps they only wished to remain present); the Savelli family had been granted the right to guard the conclave by Pope Gregory X, but Gio Baptista wished for the first time to carry out this duty from inside the conclave; the barons were eventually expelled.

Prospero Colonna, the nephew of Pope Martin V and Protodeacon of the Sacred College, was regarded as the leading papabile at the start of the conclave. Colonna received 10 votes (two short of the requisite two-thirds majority) in the first scrutiny, on Sunday, March 5; 8 votes went to Domenico Capranica, and there were five for Parentucelli (Bononiensis). The next day the adherents of Colonna continued to vote for him, while the other eight attempted to peel away votes (unsuccessfully) by switching their choice to others, including the non-cardinal archbishops of Benevento and Florence. Colonna had the support of the French cardinals and those who were impressed with the influence he enjoyed in various Italian city-states, but he did not have the support of the Roman public due to Colonna's use of extrajudicial violence during his uncle's papacy. The people (that is to say, the leaders in Roman politics) preferred Niccolo d'Acciapaccio. Aeneas Silvius Piccolomini, who was one of the Custodians of the Conclave and is a principal source for the event, says merely that on Monday morning, March 6, there was some talk about the Archbishops, and then the scrutiny took place. There seems to be no evidence that they actually received votes.

On March 6, after the first of the two daily scrutinies, during which Colonna again received 10 votes, Cardinal Capranica addressed the conclave, reminding them of the various dangers facing the church, including the armies of the Alfonso, King of Aragon, which were sailing towards Italy, the (now unopposed) reign of Antipope Felix V, Duke of Savoy, as well as a certain "Count Francis"—imploring two more cardinals to throw their support to Colonna. According to Trollope, the cardinals' term for Colonna as "mansuetto agnello" (mild as a lamb) would have been viewed as ironic, given that Colonna had carried off much of the papal treasure on the death of Martin V with the help of his noble relatives, and had for a time been excommunicated by Eugene IV prior to his disgorgement.

Tommaso Parentucelli rose following this speech, and Giovanni Berardi (thinking that his colleague was about to give the election to Colonna) interrupted him and asked for a delay. At this point Ludovico Trevisan, angered at Berardi's blocking of Colonna asked whom Berardi wished to see elected instead. Berardi replied "Bononiensis" (Parentucelli). Parentucelli (misinterpreting, perhaps purposefully, his words) declared that he "too" was willing to give his vote to whoever the choice of Berardi was. "Then, I give my vote for you!" Berardi exclaimed, a move which Trevisan felt obliged to follow. One after another the cardinals threw their support to Parentucelli, with the eleventh vote coming from "Cardinal Marino", and the decisive twelfth vote coming from the "Cardinal of San Sisto".

== Electors ==
The eighteen electors were:

- Giovanni Berardi (created on 18 December 1439) – Cardinal-Bishop of Palestrina; commendatario of SS. Nereo ed Achilleo; Dean of the Sacred College of Cardinals; grand penitentiary
- Francesco Condulmer (19 September 1431) – Cardinal-Bishop of Porto e Santa Rufina; Subdean of the Sacred College of Cardinals; Vice-Chancellor of the Holy Roman Church; bishop of Verona; Latin Patriarch of Constantinople
- Domenico Capranica (23 July 1423) – Cardinal-Priest of S. Croce in Gerusalemme; commendatario of S. Maria in Via Lata; administrator of the see of Fermo; Cardinal-protector of the Teutonic Order
- Niccolo d'Acciapaccio (18 December 1439) – Cardinal-Priest of S. Marcello; archbishop of Capua
- Giorgio Fieschi (18 December 1439) – Cardinal-Priest of S. Anastasia; commendatario of the see of Noli; Camerlengo of the Sacred College of Cardinals
- Basilios Bessarion (18 December 1439) – Cardinal-Priest of SS. XII Apostoli; titular archbishop of Nicea and Tebe
- António Martinez de Chaves (18 December 1439) – Cardinal-Priest of S. Crisogono; bishop of Porto; commendatario of the see of Giovinazzo; archpriest of the Lateran Basilica
- Jean Le Jeune (18 December 1439) – Cardinal-Priest of S. Prassede; bishop of Thérouanne
- Guillaume d'Estouteville, O.S.B.Cluny (18 December 1439) – Cardinal-Priest of SS. Silvestro e Martino ai Monti; bishop of Angers; administrator of the sees of Nîmes and Béziers; archpriest of the Liberian Basilica
- Juan de Torquemada, O.P. (18 December 1439) – Cardinal-Priest of S. Maria in Trastevere
- Ludovico Trevisan (1 July 1440) – Cardinal-Priest of S. Lorenzo in Damaso; Patriarch of Aquileia; Camerlengo of the Holy Roman Church; bishop of Cava
- Alonso de Borja (2 May 1444) – Cardinal-Priest of SS. IV Coronati; bishop of Valencia
- Enrico Rampini (16 December 1446) – Cardinal-Priest of S. Clemente; archbishop of Milan
- Tommaso Parentucelli (16 December 1446) – Cardinal-Priest of S. Susanna; bishop of Bologna
- Juan Carvajal (16 December 1446) – Cardinal-Priest of S. Angelo in Pescheria; bishop of Plasencia
- Giovanni de Primis, O.S.B.Cas. (16 December 1446) – Cardinal-Priest of S. Sabina; commendatario of the see of Catania
- Prospero Colonna (24 May 1426) – Cardinal-Deacon of S. Giorgio in Velabro; Protodeacon
- Pietro Barbo (1 July 1440) – Cardinal-Deacon of S. Maria Nuova; administrator of the see of Cervia; archpriest of the Vatican Basilica

=== Absentees ===
- Pierre de Foix, O.F.M. (September 1414) – Cardinal-Bishop of Albano; legate in Avignon; administrator of the sees of Lescar and Comminges
- Henry Beaufort (24 May 1426) – Cardinal-Priest of S. Eusebio; Protopriest; administrator of the see of Winchester
- Juan Cervantes (24 May 1426) – Cardinal-Priest of S. Pietro in Vincoli; administrator of the see of Segovia; papal legate in Lombardy
- John Kemp (18 December 1439) – Cardinal-Priest of S. Balbina; archbishop of York
- Isidore of Kiev (18 December 1439) – Cardinal-Priest of SS. Marcellino e Pietro; titular archbishop of Kiev
- Zbigniew Oleśnicki (18 December 1439) – Cardinal-Priest of S. Prisca; bishop of Kraków
- Petrus von Schaumberg (18 December 1439) – Cardinal-Priest of S. Vitale; bishop of Augsburg
- Dénes Szécsi (18 December 1439) – Cardinal-Priest of S. Ciriaco; archbishop of Esztergom
