= Giovanni Berardi =

Italian Cardinal

Giovanni Berardi (1380 – 21 January 1449) was the Cardinal and bishop.

He was born into the family De Ponte (De Pontibus) of the counts of Tagliacozzo. He was elected Archbishop of Taranto in 1421, and occupied the see until December 1439, when Pope Eugenius IV raised him to the cardinalate. He represented Eugene at the Council of Basel, and later served as papal legate in Germany against antipope Felix V (1439–40), and as legate a latere to establish peace between kings of Sicily and Aragon, 1440–41.

He was named bishop of the suburbicarian see of Palestrina on 7 March 1444, and grand penitentiary, at the end of that year. As the most senior cardinal-bishop residing in Roman Curia, he became dean of the Sacred College of Cardinals in 1445. He presided over the papal conclave, 1447, and successfully promoted the candidature of Cardinal Tommaso Parentucelli, who was elected Pope Nicholas V.

He died in Rome at the age of 69 and is buried in the church of S. Agostino, Rome.

Catholic Church titles
Preceded by Nicolò Acciapacci	Camerlengo of the Sacred College of Cardinals; 1443-1444	Succeeded by Alberto Alberti
