= Alberti family =

Florentine politics

Coat of arms of the Alberti family

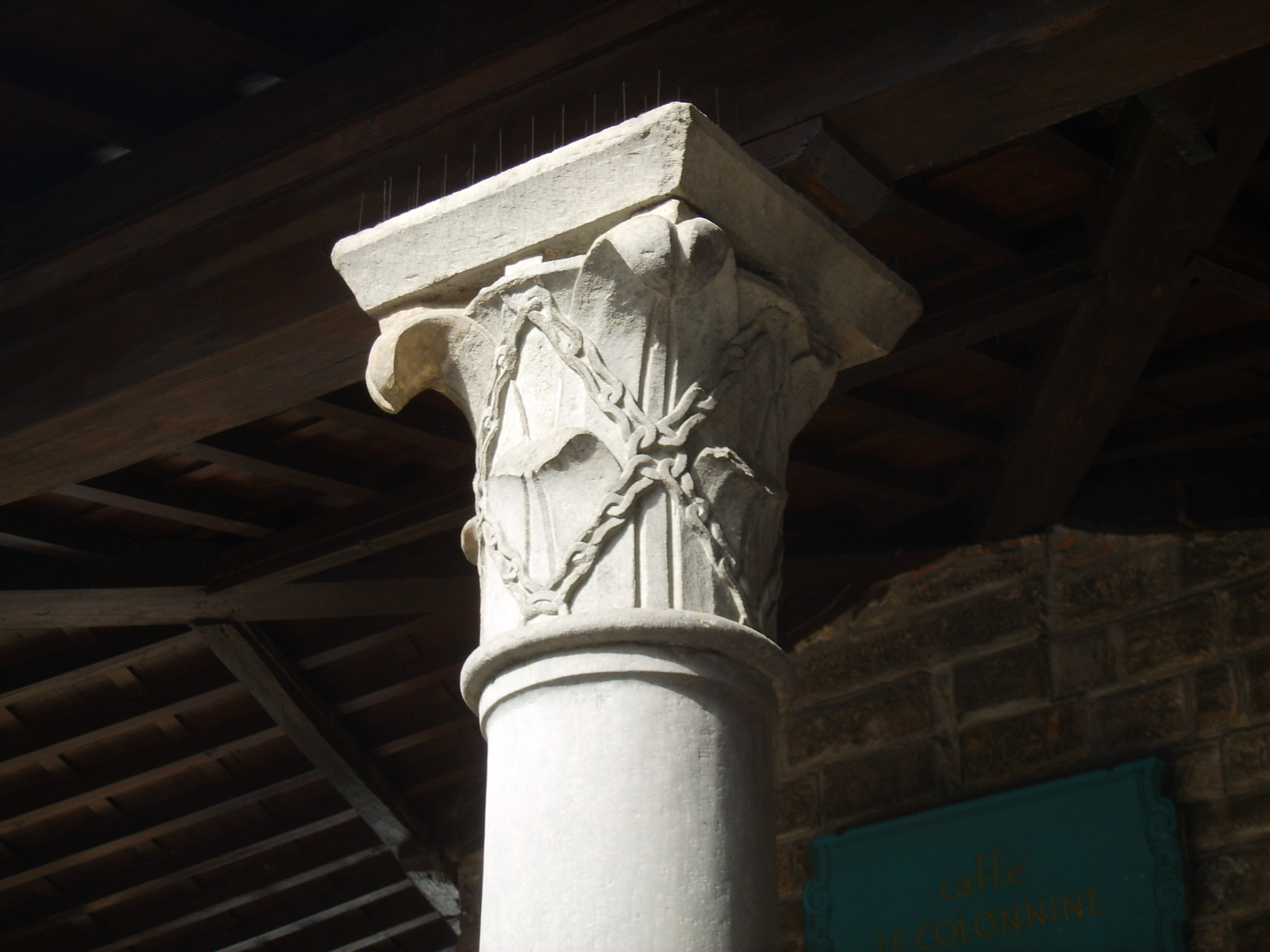
Torre degli Alberti loggia, Florence

The Alberti family was a major political and noble family in Florence, allies of the Medicis, with trading agencies across Europe.

== History ==
The Alberti originated from the castle of Catenaia in Valdarno Casentinese, whence the presence of two chains (Italian: catena) in their coat of arms. They became established in Florence during the 13th century with judge Rustico Alberti and divided into different lines, who owned several houses and towers near the modern Ponte alle Grazie. Due to their Guelph allegiance, they were exiled after the Battle of Montaperti, but returned after Manfred of Sicily's defeat in the battle of Benevento (1266). They subsequently sided for the Black Guelph faction, and established a flourishing trade company with agencies at Bologna, Genoa, Venice, Barcelona, Paris, Ghent, Brussels, Bruges and London, as well as in Syria and Greece.

In 1378, the Alberti were again banned for their support of the Ciompi revolt. Some of them were admitted in the Venetian nobility late in the century. Returned to Florence, in the 15th century they were first allied to the Medici against the Albizzi.

The family's importance decreased after the creation of the Grand Duchy of Tuscany in the 16th century. The main lineage died during the Victorian Era, and their lands passed on to in-laws. After numerous legal battles, the blood-related Alberti branch of the family recovered several properties.

== Albertis family branch ==
Coat of arms of the d'Albertis family

The d'Albertis family of Liguria stemmed from the Alberti family of Florence when a branch of the Florentine house relocated to the Western Ligurian Riviera before the year 1200. Over generations in Genoa, localized linguistic and dialect shifts permanently altered the original Tuscan surname into its regional spelling d'Albertis.

The Mazzetti d’Albertis family legally merged on June 25, 1978, when former King Umberto II of Italy issued formal Letters patent extending the noble title of Countess Maria Pia d'Albertis and authorizing her sons, Giuseppe and Vittorio, to combine their paternal Mazzetti name with the maternal d'Albertis lineage.

== Notable members ==
- Antonio Alberti, Italian writer
- Alberto Alberti (1386-1445), Cardinal
- Leon Battista Alberti (1404-1472), Italian architect and Renaissance theorist

== See also ==
- Palazzo Malenchini Alberti
- Torre degli Alberti
