= Giovanni de Primis =

Italian Roman Catholic cardinal (d. 1449)

His Eminence Giovanni de Primis
- Cardinal-Deacon of Santa Sabina
- Church: Catholic Church
- In office: 1446–1449
- Predecessor: Giuliano Cesarini (seniore)
- Successor: Guillaume-Hugues d'Estaing
- Previous post: Administrator of Catania (1447–1449)

Orders
- Created cardinal: 16 December 1446 by Pope Eugenius IV
- Rank: Cardinal-Priest

Personal details
- Born: Catania, Italy
- Died: 21 January 1449 Naples, Italy

Giovanni de Primis, O.S.B. (Latin: Joannes de Primo) (d. 1449) was a Catholic cardinal.

== Biography ==
De Primis was born in Catania, Italy. (His surname may be rendered as de' Primi; De Prima; De Primo; De Primi; or De Prim; and he was often called Giovanni di Sicilia). In 1422, he entered the Benedictine Abbey of Santa Giustina in Padua. The date of his ordination is uncertain. In 1427, he served as definitor and scribe of his order and was elected as abott of the monastery of Santa Paolo fuori le Mura in Rome where he served until 1434. In 1439, he was named abbot of Santa Giustina. He was seminal in securing the peace between Alfonso V of Aragon and René of Anjou and was recognized for his efforts on 22 April 1444 by Pope Eugenius IV who named him as apostolic nuncio to the Kingdom of Trinacria (Sicily). On 28 May 1444 he founded the University of Catania. On 16 December 1446 he was elevated to the cardinalate as Cardinal-Priest of Santa Sabina. On 3 February 1447 he was named Administrator of Catania, and on 2 December 1448 he was named as bishop of the diocese. It is not certain if he ever received episcopal consecration or took possession of the diocese.

He participated in the papal conclave of 1447 which elected Pope Nicholas V. De Primis died in Naples on 21 January 1449, where he is buried at the Benedictine Cassinese church of Santa Severino.

Catholic Church titles
Preceded by Giuliano Cesarini (seniore)	Cardinal-Deacon of Santa Sabina; 1446–1449	Succeeded by Guillaume-Hugues d'Estaing
Preceded by Giovanni Pesce	Administrator of Catania; 1447–1449	Succeeded by Arias de Avalos
