= Dudum ad nostram audientiam =

1442 papal bull by Eugene IV

The papal bull Dudum ad nostram audientiam was promulgated by Eugene IV on August 8, 1442. It advocated the complete social separation of Jews and Christians and created a legal basis for the creation of Jewish ghettos in Europe. The later papal bull Cum nimis absurdum built on Dudum ad nostram audientiam to create the Jewish ghetto of Rome in the Papal States.
