= Julian Cesarini =

Cardinal of the Roman Catholic Church

His Eminence Giuliano Caesarini
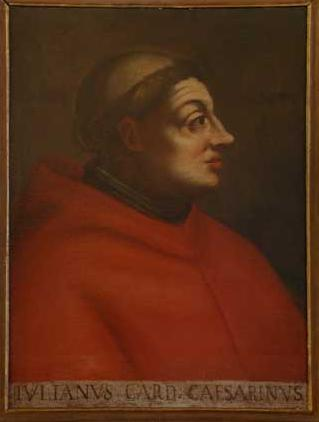
- Giuliano Caesarini, portrait from the University of Bologna
- Church: Latin Church
- See: See of Rome

Orders
- Ordination: by Pope Martin V

Personal details
- Born: 1398 Rome, Papal States
- Died: 10 November 1444 (aged 45–46) Varna, Ottoman Empire
- Denomination: Roman Catholic

Julian Cesarini the Elder (It.: Giuliano Cesarini, seniore) (1398 in Rome – 10 November 1444 in Varna, Ottoman Empire) was one of the group of cardinals appointed by Pope Martin V upon the conclusion of the Western Schism. His intellect and diplomacy made him a powerful agent first as part of the Council of Basel and then, after he broke with the Conciliar movement at Basel, of papal superiority against the Conciliar movement. The French bishop Bossuet described Cesarini as the strongest bulwark that the Catholics could oppose to the Greeks in the Council of Florence.

One of five brothers of a well-established Roman family of the minor nobility; his brother Giacomo was appointed papal Podestà of Orvieto and Foligno in 1444; his great-nephew, also Giuliano Cesarini Giuliano (1466–1510) was made a cardinal in 1493. He was educated at Perugia, where he lectured on Roman law and had Domenico Capranica among his pupils. When the schism was ended by the general recognition of Martin V as pope, Giuliano returned to Rome, where he attached himself to Cardinal Branda da Castiglione.

The suggestions for wide reform that informed the Conciliar Movement were rife, and Cesarini devoted his career to the principles of the outward unity of the Church and its reformation from within.

In 1419, he accompanied Cardinal Branda da Castiglione, who thought highly of him, on his difficult mission to Germany and Bohemia, where the Hussites were in open rebellion. He also served as a papal envoy to England. In 1426 Martin V created Cesarini a cardinal and later sent him to Germany to preach a crusade against the Hussites. After the crusade failed, Cesarini was sent to Basel to preside over the council that had begun there.

== Council of Basel, Hungary and death ==
Cesarini was made President of the Council of Basel, in which capacity he successfully resisted the efforts of Eugenius IV to dissolve the council, though later (1437) he withdrew, believing the majority of delegates present were more anxious to humiliate the pope than to accomplish reforms, for his first loyalty was to the idea of church unity. When Eugenius convoked the rival Council of Ferrara, Cesarini was made head of the commission appointed to confer with the Greeks. In 1439, owing to a plague, the council was transferred from Ferrara to Florence, where Cesarini continued to play a prominent part in the negotiations with the Greeks. These negotiations ended in a short-lived ecclesiastical reunion of East and West.

After the council was dissolved, Cesarini was sent as papal legate to Hungary (1442) by Pope Eugenius IV to solve a political crisis that arose after the death of King Albert of Hungary (from the House of Habsburg) in 1439. The widow, Queen Elisabeth of Luxembourg, was left alone with her newborn son, who was crowned as Ladislaus V of Hungary. However, the Turkish wars represented a serious danger to the Kingdom, and the noblemen summoned the young King Władysław of Poland and crowned him as Hungarian King, making him promise that he would defend the state against the Ottomans. On 13 December 1442, Cesarini made the two parties reach an agreement in the city of Győr, where the rights of the baby Ladislas were recognized in the presence of the new King, without endangering the power of the other. After this, Cesarini became the confidant of King Władysław, and in 1443 went to Vienna as his ambassador to the court of Frederick III. Soon, he became one of the principal planners of a new crusade against the Ottomans, who had begun to invade Europe. In June 1444, the Hungarian King signed a peace treaty (Peace of Szeged) with the Turkish sultan Murad II that would last for 10 years, but seeing this as a mistake and considering the moment and the circumstances appropriate for a new war, Cesarini insisted that the Hungarian King Władysław should break the treaty. This occurred in September of the same year, when they all marched to the Balkans in a new campaign. It was an unfortunate step and resulted in the disastrous defeat of the papal army at Varna (in eastern Bulgaria) on 10 November 1444, when Cardinal Giuliano Cesarini was slain in the fight. In a letter to the Duke of Milan, his friend Aeneas Sylvius Piccolomini tells of reports that, having escaped the fray, though wounded and bleeding, Cesarini was set upon by a band of Hungarians who, in the confusion of defeat, robbed and killed him. "Wounded in the battle, and fainting in his flight through loss of blood, he was slain near a marsh by the impious hands of the Hungarians, not at the instigation of the nobility, but through the rage of the populace; and thus breathed forth that glorious spirit which once with its sweet discourse swayed at will the assembled fathers at Basle"

Rumours that he had escaped proved false. The Roman curia, however, was slow to accept that the cardinal was dead.

His two well-known letters to Aeneas Sylvius Piccolomini (later Pius II) about the pope's relations to the Council of Basel are printed among the works of Pius II Piccolomini, in his letters, describes Cesarini as unfortunate in war, but he also says the cardinal went straight to heaven upon being martyred by the Turks.

== Sources ==
- Christianson, Gerald (1979), Cesarini, the conciliar cardinal: the Basel years, 1431–1438, S[ank]t Ottilien: EOS-Verlag, ISBN 978-3-88096-074-9.

Catholic Church titles
Preceded by	Cardinal In Pectore; 1426–1430	Succeeded by
Preceded by Pedro Fonseca	Cardinal-Deacon of Sant'Angelo in Pescheria; 1430–1440	Succeeded by Juan de Carvajal
Preceded by Antonio Casini	Administrator of Grosseto; 1439–1444	Succeeded by Memmo de Aggazaria
Preceded by Bálint Alsáni	Cardinal-Priest of Santa Sabina; 1440–1444	Succeeded by Giovanni de Primis
Preceded by Giovanni Berardi	Administrator of Taranto; 1440–1444	Succeeded by Mario Orsini
Preceded by Louis de Luxembourg	Cardinal-Bishop of Frascati; 1444	Succeeded by Bessarion Basilios
