= Torre degli Alberti =

Medieval tower in Florence, Italy

Coordinates: 43°46′4.68″N 11°15′35.61″E

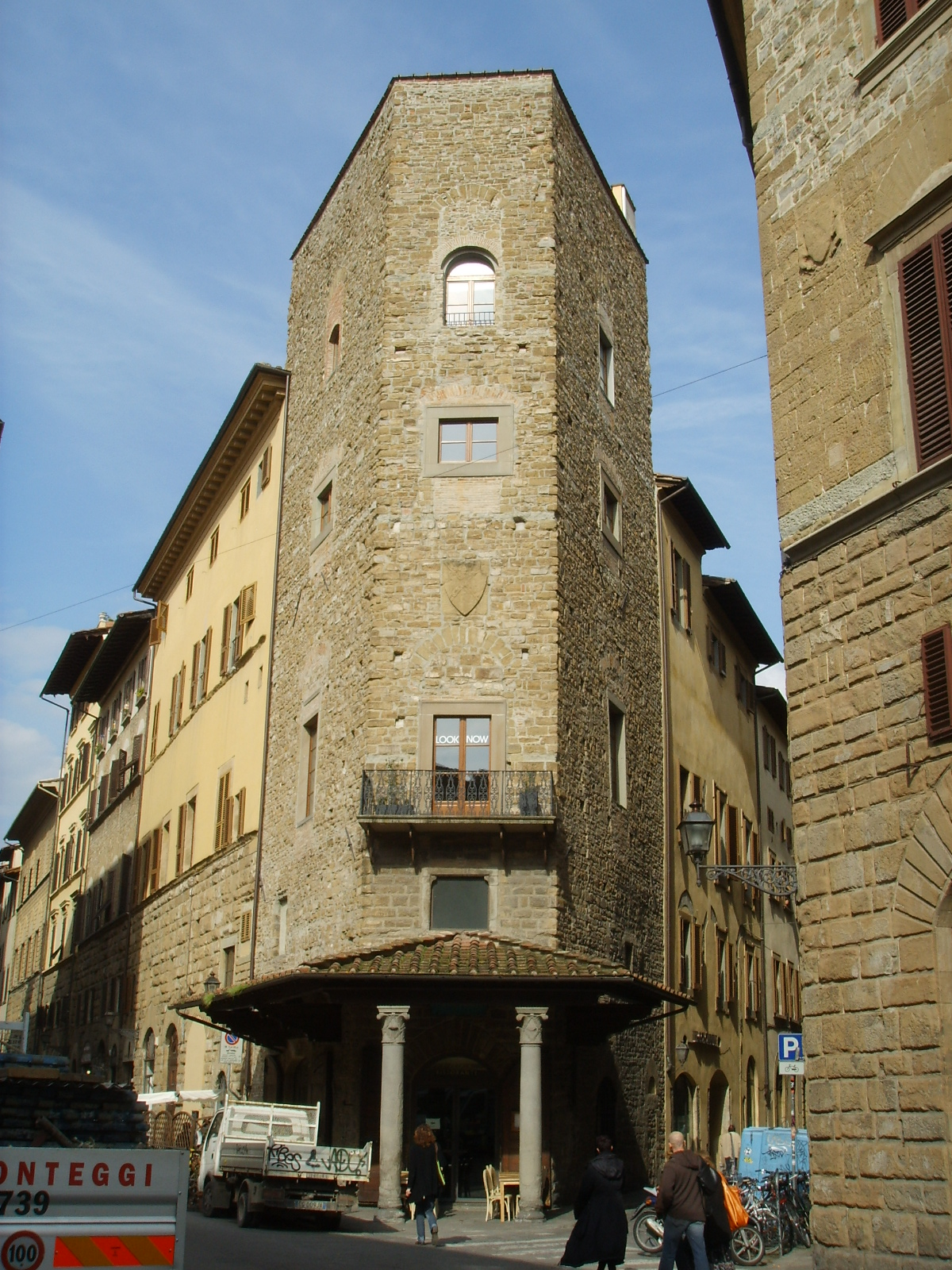
Torre degli Alberti.

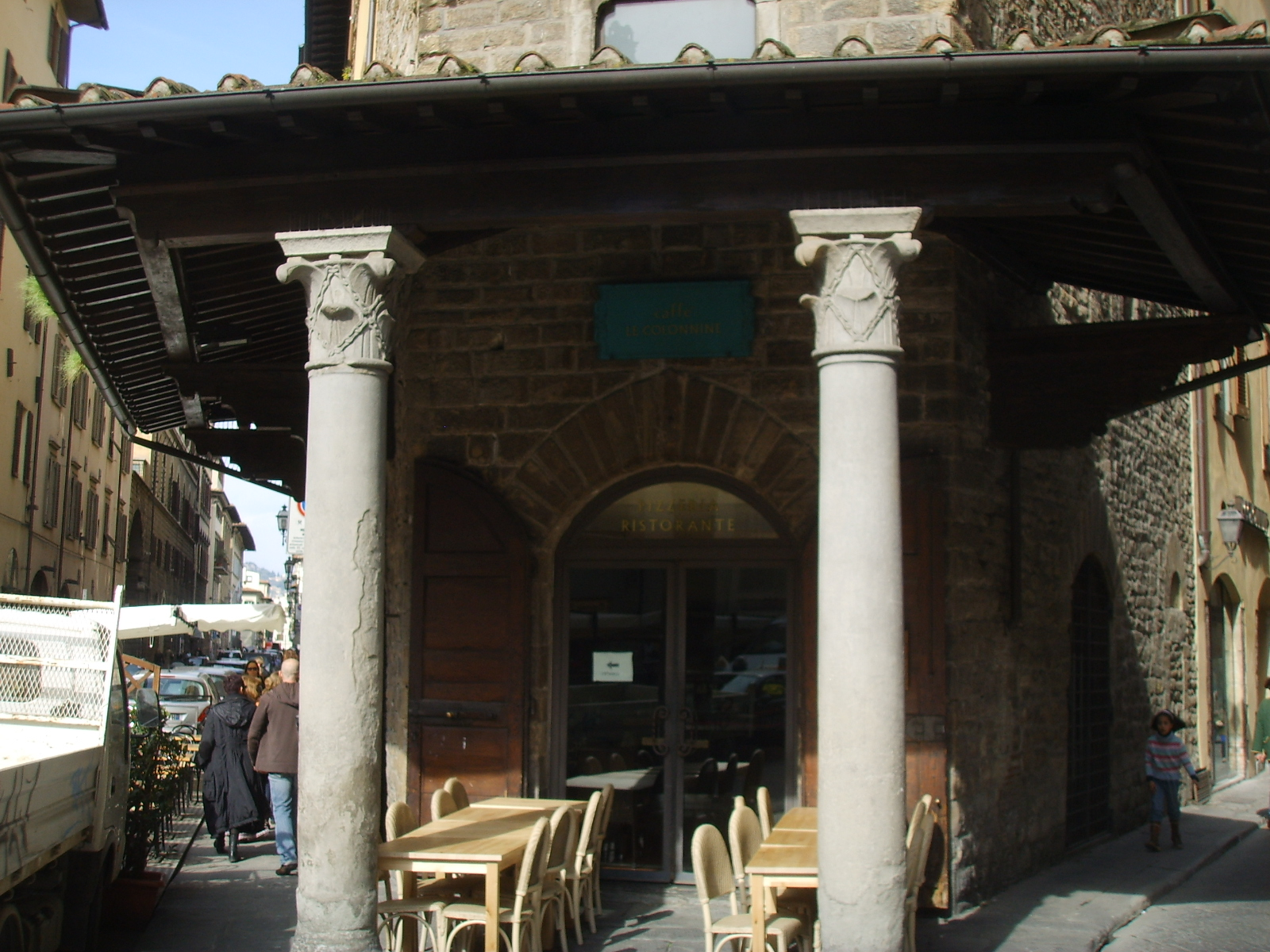
The base columns with the Alberti coat of arms.

The Torre degli Alberti is a XIII century medieval tower in Florence, Italy. It has a polygonal plan and was the headquarters and residence of the Alberti, one of the most numerous and powerful families in the medieval Florence.

It was once sided by a ditch (a nearby church was known as San Jacopo dei Fossi, Italian for "St. James of the Ditches") and had some single mullioned windows, now replaced by normal windows. At the base is a small loggia from the 15th century, whose capitals show the Alberti coat of arms, featuring two crossing chains. After the Florentine branch of the family disappeared in 1836, it was owned by other families such as the Ubaldini and Mori. It was restored during the 1990s.

== Sources ==
- Grimaldi, Fortunato (2005). Le "case-torri" di Firenze. Florence: Edizioni Tassinari.
