= Nicolò Acciapacci =

Nicolò Acciapacci (1383–1447) was a Neapolitan bishop and cardinal. An ally of Francesco Sforza, he spent his last years in exile from Rome, but was considered a candidate for the papacy in 1447.

== Early life ==
Acciapacci was the second son of Pietro Acciapacci and Maria Capece. He was born in Sorrento in 1383. He studied canon law at the University of Naples. On 17 September 1410, he was appointed bishop of Tropea by Pope Gregory XII and given a dispensation to continue his studies. In the war of the Neapolitan succession, he was at that time a supporter of King Ladislaus against the rival claim of King Louis II of Anjou. He lost his office when the Council of Pisa deposed Gregory, but John XXIII reappointed him on 30 January 1413. He served Martin V (1417–1431) as rector of Campania and Bologna and thus never resided in Tropea.

In June 1423 in Aversa, on the occasion of Louis III of Anjou's adoption by Queen Joanna II as her heir, Acciapacci delivered a public speech in his honour, Vere filius Dei est iste. He afterwards remained loyal to the Angevin claim of Louis and his son, René of Anjou. In 1436, Eugene IV appointed him archbishop of Capua. In 1439, he was promoted cardinal with the title of San Marcello al Corso.

== Cardinal ==
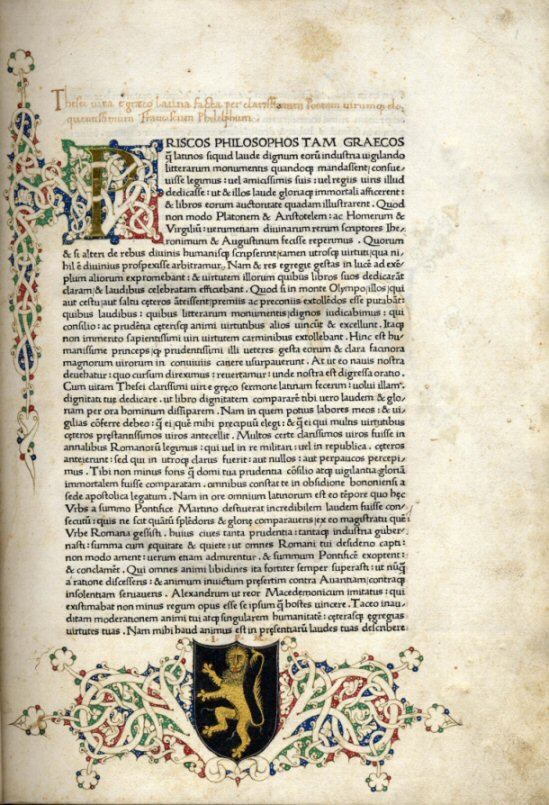
Pacini's translation of the life of Theseus dedicated to Acciapacci is the first biography in the 1470 printing of Plutarch.

He was known as the "Cardinal of Capua" because he was the first archbishop of Capua to become a cardinal. In Rome, he constructed a palace for himself on property attached to the church of Santa Maria in Via Lata. Antonio Pacini dedicated his Latin translation of the life of Theseus from Plutarchs' Parallel Lives to Acciapacci. Ulrich Han included this translation in his 1470 printing of Plutarch's Lives.

Acciapacci helped arrange the alliance of Pope Eugene, the Republic of Genoa and Francesco Sforza to support René's claim to the Neapolitan throne. His relationship with Francesco went back at least to 1420. In November 1441, as King Alfonso V of Aragon gradually surrounded Naples, Acciapacci wrote to Sforza for reinforcements. At the same time, Eugene was alienated from Sforza over the Peace of Cremona. In the August 1442 agreement between Alfonso and Sforza, Acciapacci received a pardon and the restoration of his property provided he swore an oath to Alfonso within two months. He was also included in the surrender that Giovanni Cossa made with René's permission.

== Exile ==
While pursuing detente with Alfonso, Pope Eugene declared Acciapacci persona non grata in Rome at the king's urging. On account of the cardinal's closeness to Sforza, with whom the pope was in conflict over the March of Ancona, he was not recalled from exile during Eugene's lifetime. According to Enea Silvio Piccolomini, many people urged Eugene on his deathbed to recall Acciapacci but to no avail. The cardinal returned to Rome after Eugene's death and participated in the conclave of March 1447. According to Piccolomini, he was widely regarded as a leading candidate:

The cardinal of Capua, when he heard Eugenius had died, came to Rome and was received with great favor by people and clergy. He was present at the exequies and offered prayers for the one who had sent him into exile. Many predicted that the papacy would be his. But the opinion of the people is not the same as that of the senate. Rarely does the rabble agree with the wise. Few of the cardinals were more remote from the pontificate than he.

He voted for the successful candidate, Nicholas V. He was entrusted with overseeing the canonization process of Bernardino da Siena, but died before carrying this out on 3 April. He was buried in Saint Peter's Basilica. His house in Rome passed to Cardinal Juan Carvajal.

== Bibliography ==
- Armstrong, Lilian (2018). "Illuminated Copies of Plutarchus, Vitae illustrium virorum, Venice: Nicolaus Jenson, 1478: New Attributions, New Patrons". In Anthony Ossa-Richardson; Margaret Meserve (eds.). Et Amicorum: Essays on Renaissance Humanism and Philosophy in Honour of Jill Kraye. Brill. pp. 69–117.
- Blastenbrei, Peter (1989). "The Soldier and His Cardinal: Francesco Sforza and Nicolò Acciapacci, 1438–1444". Renaissance Studies. 3 (1): 290–302. JSTOR 24409871.
- Gill, Joseph (1961). Eugenius IV, Pope of Christian Union. Newman Press.
- Izbicki, Thomas M.; Christianson, Gerald; Krey, Philip, eds. (2006). Reject Aeneas, Aaccept Pius: Selected Letters of Aeneas Sylvius Piccolomini (Pope Pius II). Catholic University of America Press.
- Manfredi, Michele (1960). "Acciapaccia, Nicola". Dizionario Biografico degli Italiani, Volume 1: Aaron–Albertucci (in Italian). Rome: Istituto dell'Enciclopedia Italiana. OCLC 883370.
- Pade, Marianne (2007). The Reception of Plutarch's Lives in Fifteenth-century Italy. Vol. 1. Museum Tusculanum Press.
- Richardson, Carol Mary (2009). Reclaiming Rome: Cardinals in the Fifteenth Century. Brill.
