= Francesco Condulmer =

Coat of arms of Francesco Condulmer

Francesco Condulmer (1390 – 30 October 1453) was a cardinal of the Roman Catholic Church.

He was made cardinal on 19 September 1431 by his uncle, Pope Eugenius IV, and accumulated many offices and dignities. He was Camerlengo of the Holy Roman Church (1432–1440), administrator of Narbonne (1433–1436) and Amiens (1436–1437). He was Archbishop of Besançon (1437–1438) and Archbishop of Verona (1438–1453), Vice-Chancellor of the Holy Roman Church (1437–1453), Latin Patriarch of Constantinople (1438–1453), and bishop of the suburbicarian see of Porto (1445–1453). He was sometimes referred to as the Cardinal of Venice.

As papal legate in Constantinople (1438), he was deeply involved in preparing for union with Greek Orthodox Church. He served also as supreme commander of the papal fleet (1444 and 1445–1446) engaged in combat with the fleet of the Ottoman Empire in the Mediterranean Sea. He participated in the Papal conclave, 1447. He may have become dean of the Sacred College in January 1451. He died at the age of 63.
