= Cristoforo di Geremia =

Italian painter (1410–1476)

Cristoforo di Geremia (1410–1476) of Mantua was a Renaissance sculptor, goldsmith, and medallist. He worked in Rome beginning sometime around 1456 and was active until 1476. He is most famous for his bronze medallion work under Pope Paul II. Cristoforo did a number of medals and jewellery for royal and noble commissions.

== Life ==
Cristoforo di Geremia's date of birth is unknown. He was most likely the son of Geremia di Nicolino dei Geremei, a Mantuan goldsmith whose name was prevalent in documents from Mantua between the years of 1438 and 1480. Cristoforo di Geremia died at the age of 46, while at what was considered the peak of his professional career.

Cristoforo di Geremia studied at the Mantuan school and was most influenced by Mantegna, who was a mentor to Cristoforo. Many of Mantegna's techniques are seen in Cristoforo's work. Although very little is known about his early professional career, it is known that Cristoforo was very interested in the art of antiquity. Many of his works contain various nuances gathered from ancient Roman coins.

=== Early works in Rome ===
Cristoforo di Geremia arrived in Rome around 1456. He spent the majority of his life in Rome, but his teachings from the Mantuan school were the most influential on his work. Cristoforo worked independently until 1461, when he was employed by Cardinal Lodovico Trevisan, a known admirer and collector of ancient art. With Cardinal Trevisan as his patron, Cristoforo travelled with the commander of the papal troops to Perugia in 1461 and to Florence in 1462. During this time, Cristoforo di Geremia was also employed by the Gonzaga family. He stayed as a guest for a month with Lodovico at the Gonzaga court. Upon his departure, he gifted his hosts four antique busts. Cristoforo also produced a characterized portrait of Lodovico Trevisan in medallion form. The medallion shows Cristoforo's passion for the art of antiquity through the construction of the profile of Trevisan. The medal is similar to the busts of a late Roman emperor. The reverse of Trevisan's medal is also indicative of Roman ties based on other coins of that period. It is rumoured that in 1466, Cristoforo made jewellery for Borso d'Este, Duke of Ferrara.

=== Under the papacy ===
After Trevisan died in 1465, Cristoforo was employed by the papal court. Pope Paul II employed Cristoforo di Geremia as his primary medallist. Pope Paul II is considered the first pontiff to realize the potential of medals as an instrument of the state and for personal propaganda. Because of this, he had more medals produced than any other 15th-century Pope. While in service to the Pope, Cristoforo primarily produced variations of two different medals. The first was oval-shaped and made to commemorate his pontification and political shrewdness. The second medal was circular and was produced to recognize his various campaigns at the Palazzo San Marco. One side has Pope Paul II's profile. The inscription on it reads "PAVLO VENETO PAPE II - ITALICE PACIS FVNDATORI - ROMA", which translates to "Pope Paul II Venetian - Founder of the Peace of Italy - Rome". The back shows Pope Paul II's coat of arms, from his status as the Venetian cardinal Pietro Barbo, and includes a rampant lion, the papal keys, and a tiara. The medal was produced in conjunction with the pope's announcement of peace in the Basilica of San Marco on April 25, 1468. Versions of the medal were most likely distributed to notable attendees of the event, as well as sent to secular rulers of the peninsula. As with many of Cristoforo's works, this papal medal has components inspired by antiquity. There is evidence that the profile side of the medal resembles the denarius of Emperor Hadrian. The inscription assimilates Pope Paul II to Augustus stemming from the inherently imperial nature of the peace proclamation in 1468.

One of the most prominent commissions that brought Cristoforo fame was the restoration of the equestrian statue of Marcus Aurelius in 1468. In 1469, he was commissioned to make medals for the restoration of the Palazzo Venezia. The pope strategically employed Cristoforo to use the antique concepts he was known for, but had him also cater to Pope Paul II's liking. Under the papacy, Cristoforo made a plethora of medals for Pope Paul II. Pope Paul II often buried medals in the foundations of buildings he was restoring. Many of these medals have since been recovered and attributed to Cristoforo di Geremia, despite the lack of a signature.

=== Signed works ===
There are two surviving medals signed by Cristoforo di Geremia. The first shows Constantine the Great on the front and a pseudo-classical group on the back. Although the intended meaning of the back is unknown, some attribute the representation to the Constantinian Peace of the Church. Others argue that the two figures and the inscription are the deliberate imitation of a Roman coin, the inspiration deriving from a sestertius of Plotina when Cristoforo was making his medal of Constantine. The two figures, the Emperor and the Church are clasping hands.

The second signed medal from Cristoforo di Geremia shows Alfonso V of Aragon, King of Naples. It features Alfonso V's bust and was probably inspired by Pisanello's work on Alfonso V. The back of the medal shows Alfonso enthroned and crowned by Bellona and Mars.

Cristoforo di Geremia was superseded by his nephew, the medallist Lysippus the Younger, who, along with other artists, borrowed figures and compositions from Cristoforo.

== Works ==
| Work | Year | Work Type | Front | Back |
|---|---|---|---|---|
| Lodovico Trevisan | 1461-1465 | Bronze Medal | | |
| Pope Paul II | | Bronze Medal | | |
| Constantine the Great | 1468 | Bronze Medal | | |
| Alfonso V of Aragon | | Bronze Medal | | n/a |
| Cardinal Guillaume d'Estouteville | 1461-1481 | Bronze Medal | | |
| Sacrifice to Priapus | ca. 1470 | Plaquette | | |
