= Council of Mantua (1459) =

1459 ecumenical council

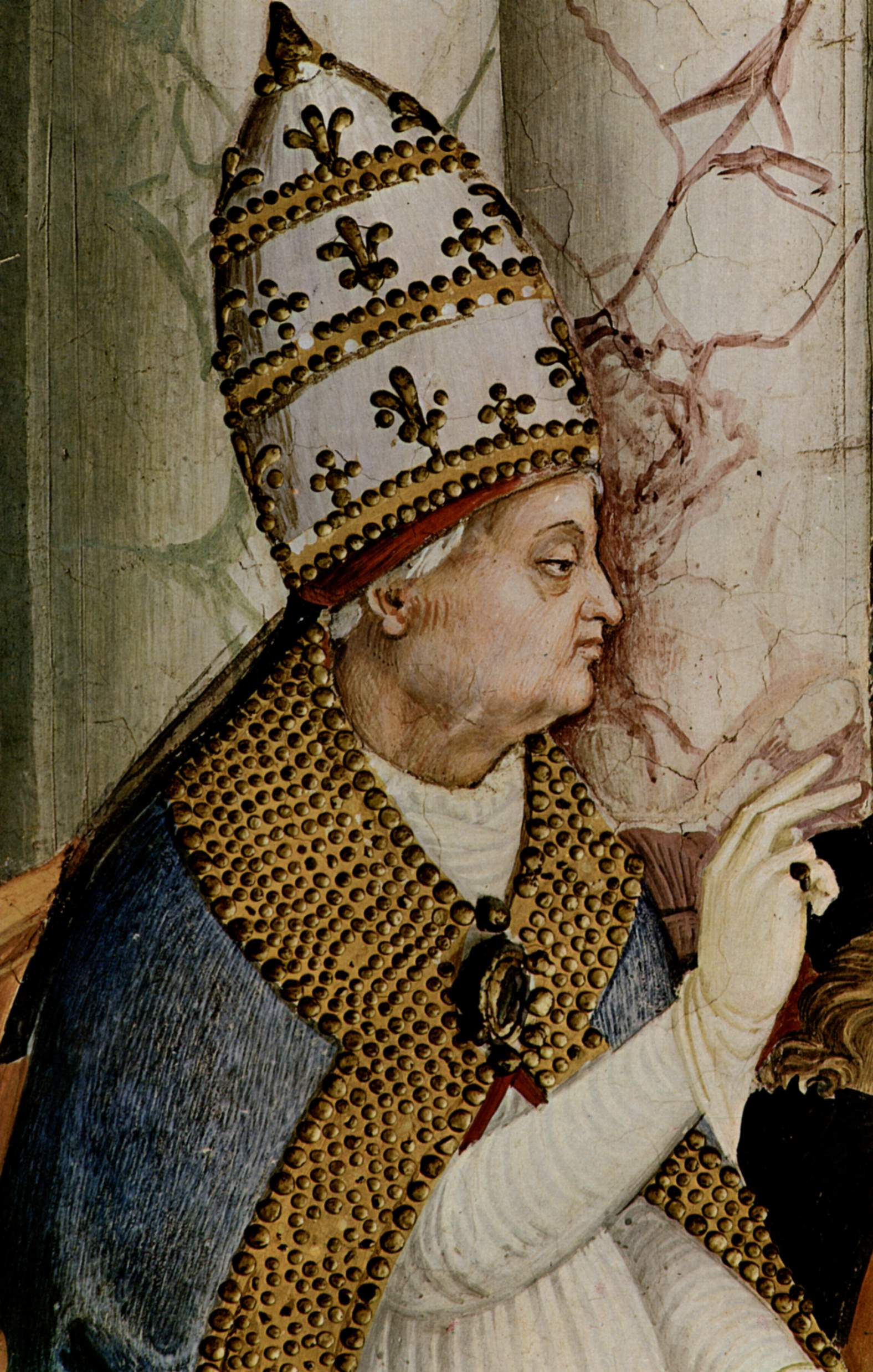
Pius II, convenor of the council.

The Council of Mantua of 1459, or Congress of Mantua, was a religious meeting convoked by Pope Pius II, who had been elected to the Papacy in the previous year and was engaged in planning war against the Ottoman Turks, who had taken Constantinople in 1453. His call went out to the rulers of Europe, in an agonized plea to turn from internecine warfare to face Christendom's common enemy.

== Process of the Council of 1459 ==
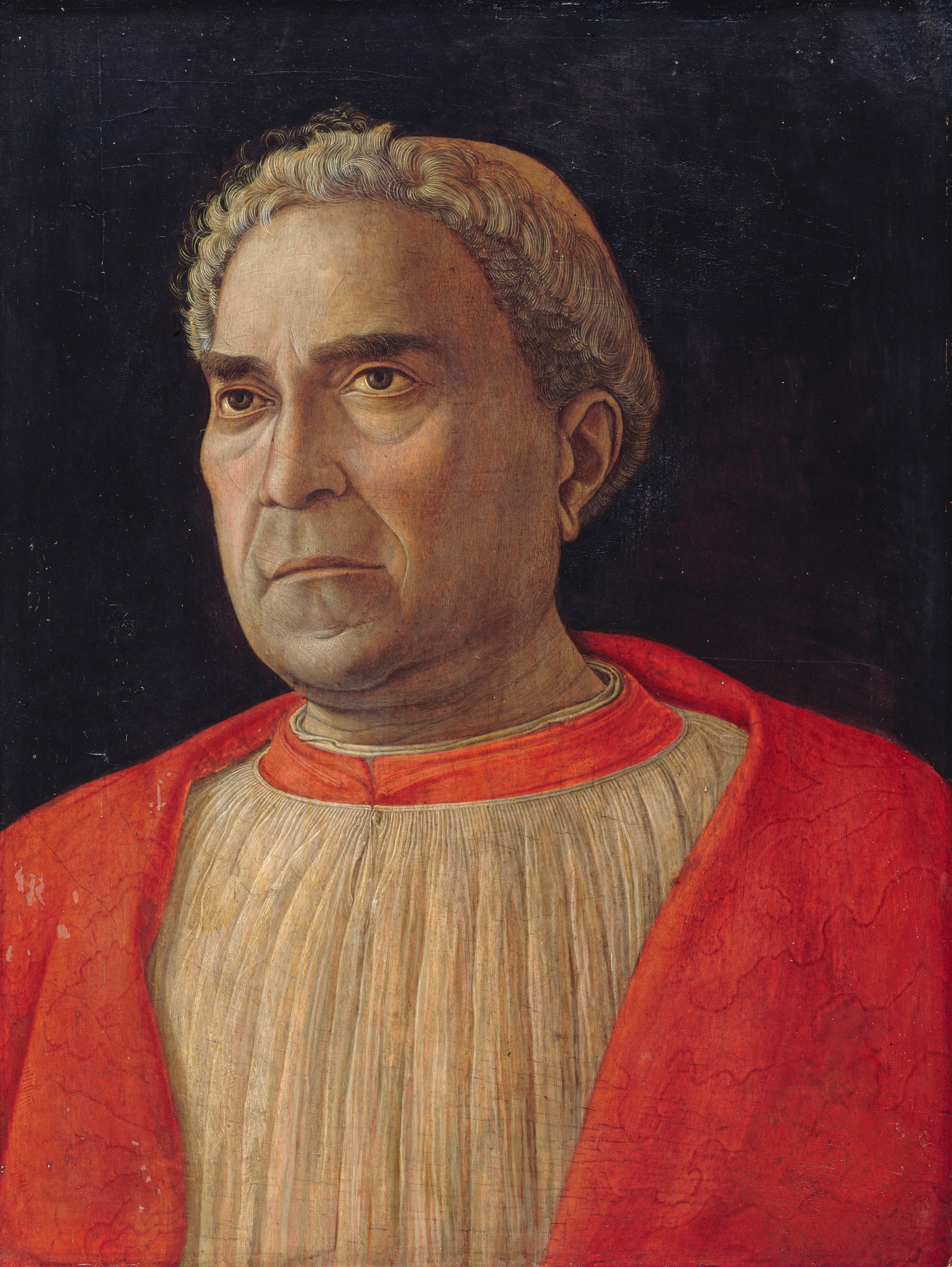
Ludovico Trevisan, participant in the war congress.

Pius entered Mantua on 27 May 1459; his long progress to the place of assembly resembled a triumphal procession. He opened the council on 1 June and waited in Mantua as the guest of Ludovico III Gonzaga until September for the various representatives to assemble. On 26 September he called for a new crusade against the Ottomans. The refugee Cardinal Bessarion and Cardinal Juan de Torquemada were in attendance. The Duke of Burgundy was represented at the Council by the duke of Clèves, who brought in his train the young Burgundian cleric Ferry de Clugny. The humanist Isotta Nogarola wrote and dispatched to Pope Pius an oration favoring a crusade.

== Criticism and effects ==
Not all the leaders of the Church were in favor of a Crusade. The Venetian Cardinal Ludovico Trevisan, patriarch of Aquileia, met Pius in Siena, on 16 March 1459, and followed the pope to Mantua, although he opposed the aims of the Council.

By the time the Council was disbanded in January 1460, an ineffectual call for a new crusade against the Infidel had been decided upon, and proclaimed by Pius on 14 January 1460. One of the only European rulers to fully endorse the Crusade was Vlad III, though he was too preoccupied defending his native Wallachia to contribute troops. The paper crusade was to last for three years and was to prove ineffectual. Pius would die in Ancona, making one last effort to launch this campaign by his own example.

Pope Pius II had originally called for a crusade against the Turks in 1456, with limited success. But at the council, he again called for the crusade only to be turned down by the leaders of Western powers. He surmised it was both because they were too caught up fighting one another, (Note: A reference to the Anglo-French conflicts and the Hundred Years' War.) because they were afraid of the Turkish power and because the Hungarians had been too successful in their own battles with the Turks.

Historians of the Tarot like Heinrich Brockhaus have asserted that the so-called Tarocchi di Mantegna were devised and made during the sitting of this council.

== Artistic legacy ==
The painter Mantegna had been invited to Mantua by Ludovico in 1457; although remaining in Padua, he painted the Agony in the Garden that is in the National Gallery, London, for its Podestà; in Mantegna's picture, the disciples sleep in Gethsemane, while Jerusalem is envisaged as Constantinople, with the crescent moon appearing on several towers of the city signifying its capture by the Turk. Long after the pope's death, the artist Pinturicchio painted the convocation of the council among the scene's from Pius' life on the walls of the Piccolomini Library in Siena Cathedral.

== Bibliography ==
- DeVries, Kelly Robert (2010). "The Lack of a Western European Military Response to the Ottoman Invasions of Eastern Europe from Nicopolis (1396) to Mohács (1526)". Medieval Warfare 1300–1450. London: Routledge. pp. 539–559. ISBN 9781315249230.
