= Ludovico Trevisan =

Italian prelate (1401–1465)

His Eminence Ludovico Trevisan
- Patriarch of Aquileia; Camerlengo of the Holy Roman Church
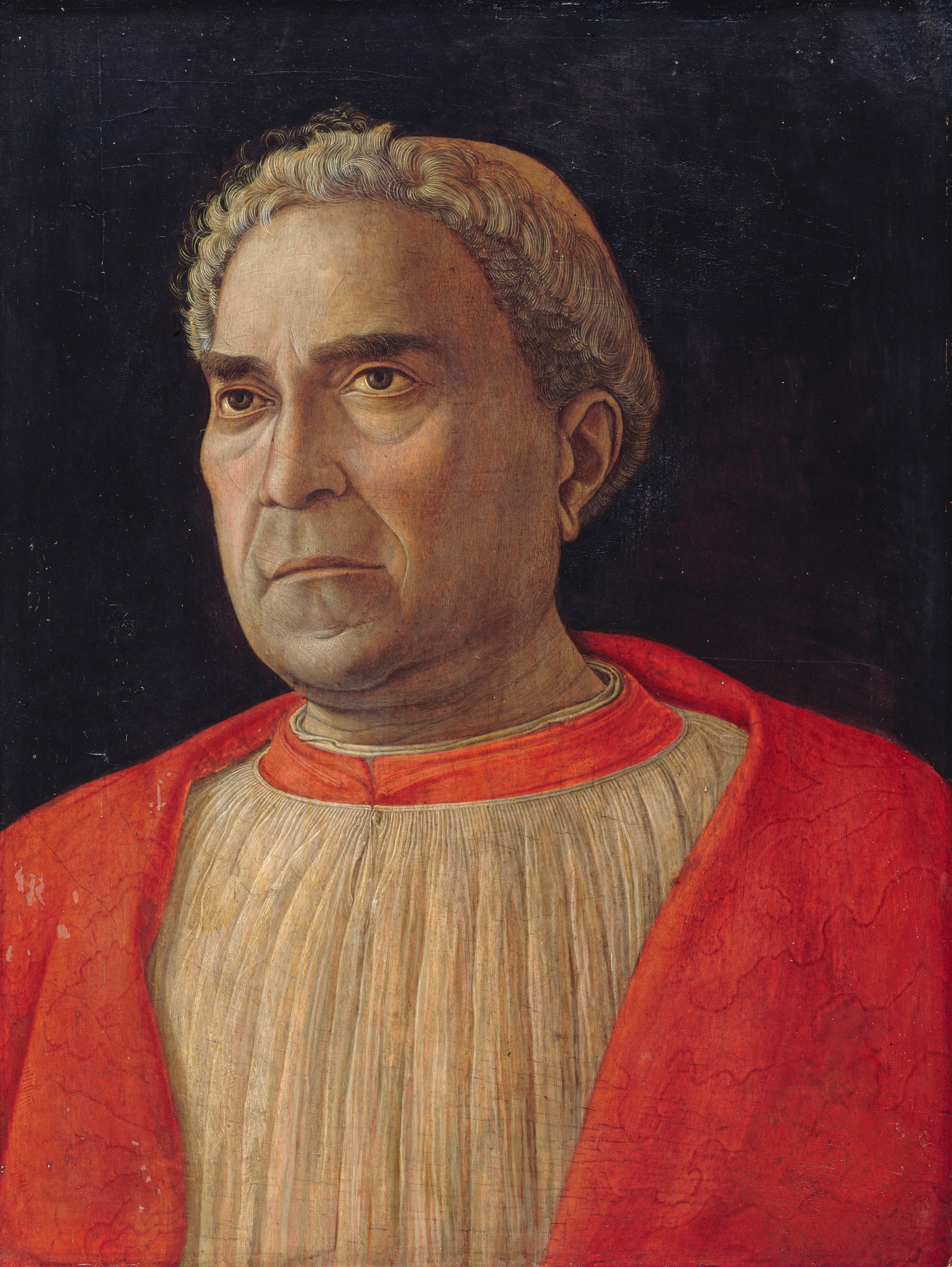
- Portrait of Ludovico Trevisan, painted by Andrea Mantegna soon after Trevisan's return to Italy in 1459
- Church: Catholic Church
- See: Aquileia
- Appointed: 18 December 1439
- Term ended: 22 March 1465
- Predecessor: Tommaso Tomasini
- Successor: Giovanni Vitelleschi
- Other posts: Camerlengo of the Holy Roman Church (1440-1465); Cardinal-Bishop of Albano (1465)
- Previous posts: Bishop of Tragurium (1435-1437); Archbishop of Florence (1437-1439); Cardinal-Priest of San Lorenzo in Damaso (1440-1465); Captain General of the Church (1455-1458)

Orders
- Created cardinal: 1 July 1440 by Pope Eugene IV
- Rank: Cardinal-Bishop

Personal details
- Born: November 1401 Padua, Republic of Venice
- Died: 22 March 1465 (aged 63–64) Rome, Papal States
- Education: University of Padua
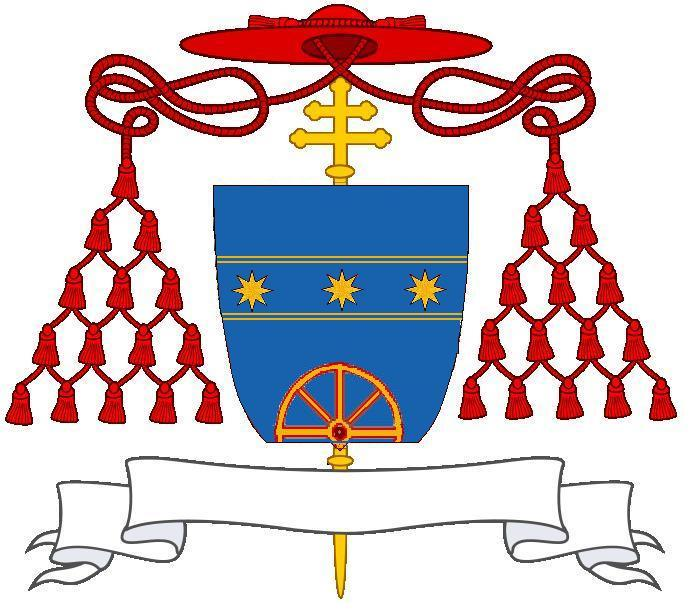
- Coat of arms

Ludovico Trevisan (November 1401 – 22 March 1465) was an Italian Catholic prelate, who was the Camerlengo of the Holy Roman Church, Patriarch of Aquileia and Captain General of the Church (commander-in-chief of the Papal Army and the Papal Navy). He succeeded his rival Giovanni Vitelleschi, a fellow cardinal of military talent and inclination, as Bishop of Traù and Metropolitan Archbishop of Florence. Trevisan was also known as the Cardinal of Aquileia and the Cardinal Camerlengo.

== Early life ==
Trevisan was born into a non-military family in Padua, then in the territory of the Republic of Venice, the son of Biagio Trevisano, a doctor in the arts and medicine. Like other war cardinals, such as Niccolò Fortiguerra and Giuliano della Rovere, Trevisan came from a humble background. His mother's maiden name was Mezzarota. His first name is sometimes also rendered Ludovico, Luigi, Luise, and Alvise; his last name as Trevisano or Scarampi-Mezzarota.

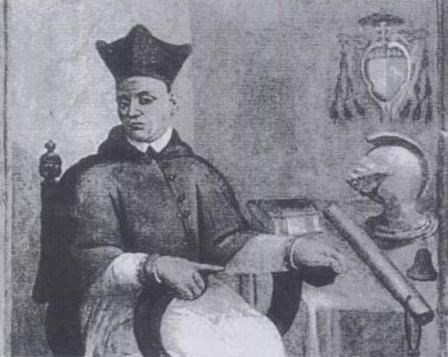
Trevisan succeeded rival Giovanni Vitelleschi in the sees of Traù and Florence.

Trevisan studied grammar and poetry, followed by the liberal arts, in Venice; he obtained a doctorate in arts and medicine at the University of Padua on 9 July 1425. After a brief stint teaching medicine, Trevisan went to Rome circa 1430 to become the physician of Cardinal Gabriele Condulmer (future Pope Eugene IV). Upon Condulmer's election as pope, Trevisan was made his cubicularius and scriptor of apostolic letters. He soon also became a canon of the cathedral chapter of Padua and began his ecclesiastical career.

== Bishopric ==
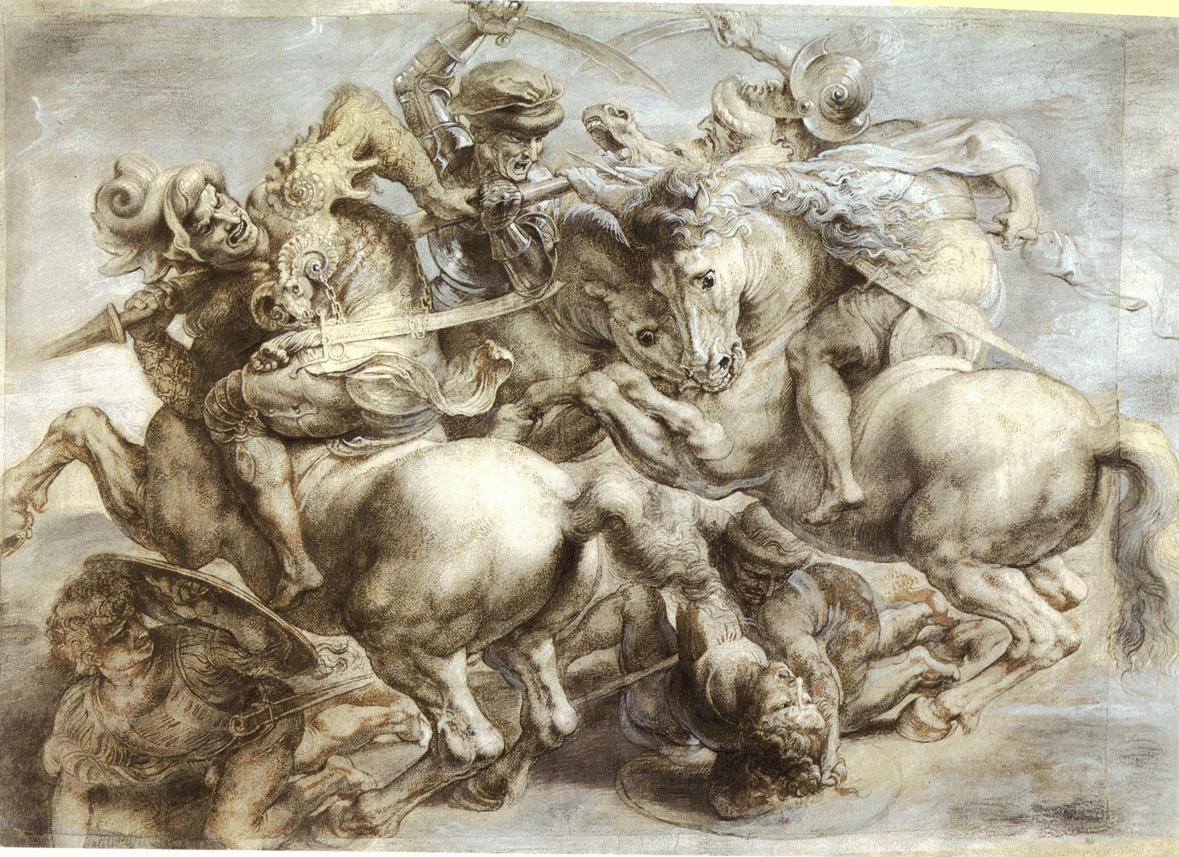
Peter Paul Rubens's copy of The Battle of Anghiari by Leonardo da Vinci. Allegedly the 2 knights at right are Ludovico Trevisan and Giovanni Antonio del Balzo Orsini.

Trevisan was elected bishop of Traù on 24 October 1435, was consecrated soon after his election, and remained bishop until 6 August 1437, governing it through his vicar, Niccolò, abbot of the monastery of S. Giovanni Battista in Traù. On 6 August 1437 Trevisan was promoted to metropolitan bishop of Florence, which he occupied until 18 December 1439. There is a record of Trevisan being in Ferrara with Eugene IV on 23 January 1438, and his subscription is found on the bull of union with the Greeks issued by Eugenius IV on 4 July 1439.

Trevisan became Patriarch of Aquileia on 18 December 1439 and occupied that see until his death. On 3 April 1440 Trevisan was commissioned as papal legate in Romagna "with the army, with the aim of recovering the lands of the Church." As a result, he undertook military operations starting on July 30 aimed at capturing Bologna but had to pause the campaign from November 23 to the following Spring, at which time he received a sizable sum from the Papal treasury.

He succeeded Vitelleschi as the pope's special deputy, possibly having engineered Vitelleschi's downfall through his henchman, Antonio Rido, and began pacifying the forces still loyal to Vitelleschi and reducing the regions of Viterbo and Civitavecchia to papal obedience. As the pope's special deputy he was the paymaster of the sizable papal army and controlled its large budget, and commanded it in the field.

On 4 June 1440 he received a special military standard and proceeded to Tuscany with a force of 3000 horsemen and 500 foot soldiers to support Francesco I Sforza and other papal and Florentine condottieri against Niccolò Piccinino. Trevisan commanded the right flank of the combined papal-Florentine forces that defeated Piccinino in the Battle of Anghiari on 29 June.

An account of his victory is also available in an important contemporary war poem, Trophaeum Anglaricum by Florentine humanist Leonardo Dati, which praises Trevisan's caution as much as his impetuosity, comparing him to captains of antiquity such as Alexander the Great and Hannibal.

== Cardinalate ==
Antonio Rido, a henchman of Trevisan, depicted on his tomb in San Pancrazio, Rome.

Immediately afterwards, on 1 July 1440, Trevisan was elevated cardinal priest, title of S. Lorenzo, by Pope Eugene IV and a medal in his honour was designed by Cristoforo di Geremia to commemorate the victory. Upon his elevation, Bishop Fortunato di Pellicanis of Sarsina began administering his patriarchate. Later that year, he became Camerlengo, an office he held until his death.

When Eugene IV and Filippo Visconti turned against Sforza, Trevisan was the organizer of the campaign to recapture the March of Ancona (to which he was named legate on 13 September 1442) for the papacy. Under Pope Callixtus III, Trevisan played an important role in organizing the naval campaign against the Ottomans in December 1455, both responsible for the construction of the Papal Navy and was appointed "apostolic legate, governor-general, captain and general condottiere" in charge of it. Trevisan defeated the Turkish assault on Mytilene in August 1457, during which many Turkish vessels were captured, receiving praise from the pope. Trevisan attended the papal congress of war in Mantua in 1459 where chronicler Andrea Schivenoglia described him on arrival as "aged sixty, a small, swarthy, hairy man, with a very proud, dark air about him" ("homo pizolo, negro, peloxo, com aìero molte superbo e schuro").

Trevisan was the only cardinal in the papal conclave, 1464 that did not subscribe to the conclave capitulation, which among other things, bound the pope to continue the Crusading war against the Ottoman Turks.

== Death and legacy ==
Trevisan died during the first year of the pontificate of Pope Paul II, with whom Trevisan was not on good terms, at 3 a.m. in Rome of edema. Like Cardinal Gil Álvarez Carrillo de Albornoz, Trevisan has been described as an "angel of peace".
