= Ulrich Han =

15th century German printer active in Italy

Page from Ulrich's Missale of 1476

Ulrich Han (1425–1479) was a German printer active in Italy.

Ulrich was born in or about 1425 in Ingolstadt. He had a brother named Wolfgang (Lupus). They sometimes Latinized their surname to Gallus. Ulrich also went by Udalricus Barbatus and Ulricus Nicolai de Wienna. He became a citizen of Vienna.

Ulrich settled in Rome and set up what was probably that city's first printing press. His edition of Juan de Torquemada's Meditationes, printed on 31 December 1466 or 1467, was the first Italian printing with woodcuts. The Missale Romanum he printed in 1476 was the first in Italy with printed music. Although his initial interest was the classics, after partnering with the merchant Simone Cardella he focused on legal, liturgical and theological works.

Ulrich died in Rome in 1479.
