= Pope Eugene IV =

Head of the Catholic Church from 1431 to 1447

- Bishop of Rome
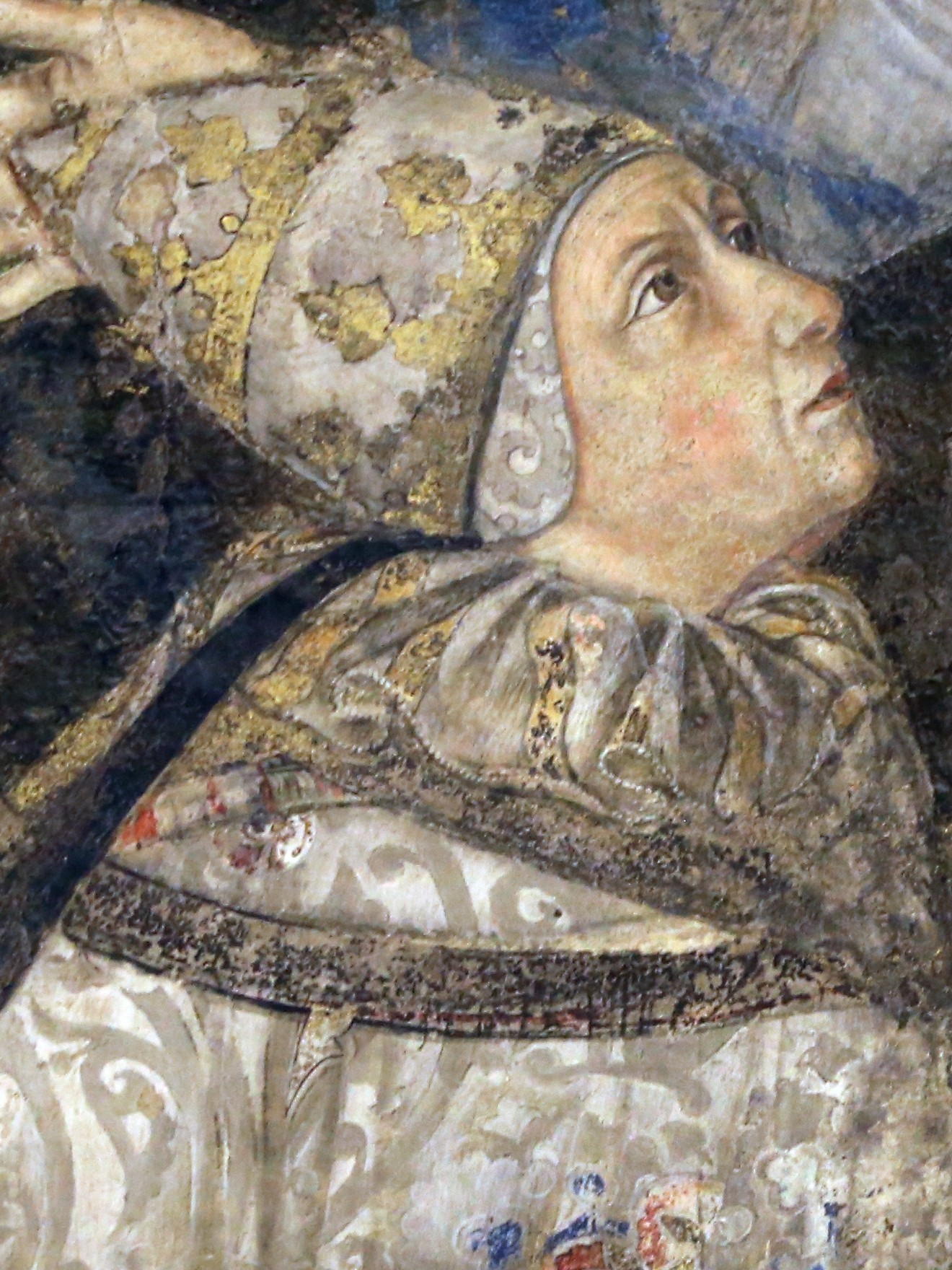
- Fresco portrait by Domenico di Bartolo in Santa Maria della Scala, Siena, c. 1444
- Church: Catholic Church
- Papacy began: 11 March 1431
- Papacy ended: 23 February 1447
- Predecessor: Martin V
- Successor: Nicholas V
- Previous posts: Bishop of Siena (1407–1408); Cardinal-Priest of San Clemente (1408–1426); Cardinal-Priest of Santa Maria in Trastevere (1426–1431)

Orders
- Consecration: 1408 by Gregory XII
- Created cardinal: 9 May 1408 by Gregory XII

Personal details
- Born: Gabriele Condulmer; 1383 Venice, Republic of Venice
- Died: 23 February 1447 (aged 63–64) Rome, Papal States
- Coat of arms

Pope Eugene IV (born Gabriele Condulmer; Latin: Eugenius IV; Italian: Eugenio IV; 1383 – 23 February 1447) was head of the Catholic Church and leader of the Papal States from 11 March 1431 to his death in February 1447. Condulmer was a Venetian and a nephew of Pope Gregory XII. In 1431, he was elected pope. He is the most recent pope to take the pontifical name "Eugene".

His tenure was marked by conflict: first with the Colonna, relatives of his predecessor Pope Martin V; and later with the Conciliar movement. In 1434, after a complaint by bishop of the Canary Islands Fernando Calvetos, Eugene IV issued the bull "Creator Omnium", rescinding any recognition of Portugal's right to conquer the islands, and rescinding any right to Christianize their native populations. Eugene also resisted slavery: he excommunicated anyone who had enslaved newly-converted Christians, such penalty to remain in place until the enslaved were restored to their liberty and possessions.

Eugene initially sought to protect the Jews, and was quite active against a rampant societal anti-semitism—he issued decrees protecting their rights, opposing forced baptisms, and permitting wider economic activity. In 1442, however, he promulgated the bull Dudum ad nostram audientiam, which was later used as the legal basis for the creation of Jewish ghettos in Europe. In 1443, Eugene decided to take a neutral position on territorial disputes between Castile and Portugal and regarding rights claimed along the coast of Africa.

== Early life ==
Condulmer was born in Venice to a rich merchant family. His father was Angelo Condulmer, who founded the Ospizio di Sant'Agnesina for orphaned girls in 1383 and his mother was Bariola Correr. He had a sister, Polissena, mother of the future Pope Paul II. Gabriel is said to have received his earliest education under the supervision of his maternal uncle, Angelo Correr, Bishop of Castello (1380–1390). He and several friends established an Augustianian community of Canons Regular of San Giorgio in Alga in his native city in 1400, and received papal approval in November 1404.

On 30 December 1407, at the age of twenty-four, Gabriel was appointed Bishop of Siena by his maternal uncle, Pope Gregory XII. He was below the minimum age for consecration as a bishop, and therefore his uncle granted him a dispensation; next day, he was granted possession of the diocese, even before the necessary bulls had been prepared. In Siena, the political leaders objected to a bishop who was not only young but also a foreigner. Therefore, in 1408 he resigned the appointment, becoming instead a cleric of the Apostolic Camera (Treasury) and a protonotary apostolic. He was named a cardinal by Pope Gregory XII in the consistory of 9 May 1408, and appointed Cardinal Priest of the titular church of San Clemente.

On 7 February 1420, Condulmer was named papal legate at Picenum in the March of Ancona. He was transferred to Bologna in August 1423. Pope Martin V named him Cardinal Priest of the Basilica of Santa Maria in Trastevere in 1427.

== Papacy ==
Pope Martin V (Colonna) died of an apoplectic stroke on 20 February 1431. The conclave to elect his successor was held at the church and convent of Santa Maria sopra Minerva, and began on 1 March 1431. Fourteen cardinals, led by Giordano Orsini, Bishop of Albano, participated. Condulmer was unanimously elected on 3 March, and was crowned as Eugenius IV on 11 March 1431, on the steps of St. Peter's Basilica by Cardinal Alfonso Carrillo de Albornoz.

By a written agreement made before his election, and ratified on 12 March 1431 as pope, Eugene pledged to distribute to the cardinals one-half of all the revenues of the Church and promised to consult with them on all questions of importance, both spiritual and temporal.

Pope Eugene made his first appointments of cardinals on 19 September 1431. They were his nephew, the Venetian Francesco Condulmer, who was granted the titular church of San Clemente; and the Roman Angelotto Fusco, the bishop of Cava and longtime friend of Eugene, who was granted the title of San Marco.

He was described as tall, thin, with a winning countenance, although many of his troubles were owing to his own want of tact, which tended to alienate others. Upon assuming the papal chair, Eugene IV took violent measures against the numerous Colonna relatives of his predecessor Martin V (who had rewarded them with castles and lands). This at once involved him in a serious contest with the powerful house of Colonna that nominally supported the local rights of Rome against the interests of the Papacy. A truce was soon arranged.

=== Conciliar reform ===
By far the most important feature of Eugene IV's pontificate was the great struggle between the Pope and the Council of Basel (1431–1439), the final embodiment of the Conciliar movement. On 23 July 1431, his legate Giuliano Cesarini opened the council, which had been convoked by Martin V. Canon Beaupère of Besançon, who had been sent from Basel to Rome, gave the pope an unfavourable and exaggerated account of the temper of the people of Basel and its environs. Distrustful of its purposes and emboldened by the small attendance, the Pope issued a bull on 18 December 1431 that dissolved the council and called a new one to meet in eighteen months at Bologna. He gave as his reason that it would be easier for the delegates from the eastern churches to assemble there with the European prelates. The council resisted this expression of papal prerogative. Eugene IV's action gave some weight to the contention that the Curia was opposed to any authentic measures of reform. The council refused to dissolve; instead they renewed the resolutions by which the Council of Constance had declared a council superior to the Pope and ordered Eugene IV to appear at Basel. A compromise was arranged by the Holy Roman Emperor Sigismund, who had been crowned emperor at Rome on 31 May 1433. The first version of Eugene's recognition of the legitimacy of the council was signed on 1 August 1433, and subscribed by three cardinals. By its terms, the Pope recalled his bull of dissolution, and, reserving all the rights of the Holy See, acknowledged the council as ecumenical. In the amended version, signed on 15 December 1433, he withheld his approval of the initial decrees of the Council which had contained canons exalting conciliar authority above that of the pope.

=== Problems in the Papal States and Rome ===
These concessions also were due to the invasion of the Papal States by the former Papal condottiero Niccolò Fortebraccio and the troops of Filippo Maria Visconti led by Niccolò Piccinino in retaliation for Eugene's support of Florence and Venice against Milan (see also Wars in Lombardy). This situation led also to establishment of an insurrectionary republic at Rome controlled by the Colonna family. On 4 June 1434, disguised in the robes of a Benedictine monk, Eugene was rowed down the center of the Tiber, pelted by stones from either bank, to a Florentine vessel waiting to receive him at Ostia. Ferdinand Gregorovius remarks that Eugene IV, "having lost the authority of the State by his own ineptitude, resolved[,] like so many of his predecessors, on flight." On 12 June, his ship reached Pisa, and in October he reached Florence.

The city of Rome was restored to obedience by Giovanni Vitelleschi, the militant Bishop of Recanati, in October 1434. In August 1435 a peace treaty was signed at Ferrara by the various belligerents. Pope Eugenius made Vitelleschi archbishop of Florence on 12 October 1435. Vitelleschi held the post until Eugenius made him a cardinal on 9 August 1437.

The people of Rome sent a delegation to Florence in January 1436, begging the pope and the curia to return to Rome, and promising obedience and quiet. The Pope, however, rejected their overture. On 25 March 1436, Pope Eugenius consecrated the cathedral of Florence, and then, in April 1436, moved to Bologna, which had recently been conquered for the papacy. His condottieri Francesco I Sforza and Vitelleschi in the meantime reconquered much of the Papal States with extreme violence and destructive force. Traditional Papal enemies such as the Prefetti di Vico were destroyed, while the Colonna were reduced to obedience after the destruction of their stronghold in Palestrina in 1437. The massive fortress was preserved, however, until Lorenzo Colonna attempted to return in 1438, when it too was destroyed on orders from Vitelleschi.

Poggio Bracciolini, the Tuscan humanist, wrote: "Seldom has the rule of any other pope produced equal devastation in the provinces of the Roman Church. The country scourged by war, the depopulated and ruined towns, the devastated fields, the roads infested by robbers, more than fifty places partly destroyed, partly sacked by soldiery, have suffered from every species of revenge."

=== Recovery of power and of Rome ===
Meanwhile, the struggle with the council sitting at Basel broke out anew. Eugene IV convened a rival council at Ferrara on 8 January 1438, through his legate Cardinal Niccolò Albergati, Bishop of Bologna, with forty prelates in attendance. The pope also excommunicated the prelates assembled at Basel. On 14 January 1438, he moved the papal court to Ferrara, where he remained for a year. On 15 February 1438, he issued the bull "Cum In Sacro", declaring the council at Ferrara an ecumenical council, and commanding the prelates at Basel to appear at Ferrara within a month.

King Charles VII of France had forbidden members of the clergy in his kingdom from attending the council in Ferrara, and introduced the decrees of the Council of Basel, with slight changes, into France through the Pragmatic Sanction of Bourges (7 July 1438). The King of England and the Duke of Burgundy, who felt that the council was partial to France, decided not to recognize the council at Basel. Castile, Aragon, Milan, and Bavaria withdrew support.

The Council of Basel, in its Session XXXI, suspended Pope Eugene on 24 January 1438. There were 16 bishops present at this session. Of the 16, nine were Savoyards, six Aragonese, and one Frenchman. Several secular powers, seeing the advantage to their own interests in having a weak pope and an unsteady council at odds with each other, wrote to the council, advising them to go no further in their efforts to depose Eugene. Mandell Creighton remarks, "The quarrel of the Pope and the Council now ceased to attract the attention of Europe; it had degenerated into a squabble in which both parties were regarded with something approaching contempt."

The Council of Basel then purported to formally depose Eugene as a heretic on 25 June 1439. The business of electing a new pope was complicated by the fact that there was only one cardinal at Basel, Louis Aleman. The Council decided to appoint an electoral committee, composed of thirty-two electors, who were selected by a nominating committee. The conclave began on 30 October 1439. On 5 November, the council elected the ambitious Duke Amadeus VIII of Savoy, as antipope; he took the name Felix V.

The Diet of Mainz was summoned by the new Emperor Frederick III to hear the claims of both Eugene and Felix. Eugene was represented by Nicholas of Cusa and Juan de Torquemada. The diet was not impressed by the ecclesiastical claims of either party, and announced that it would support whichever party would summon a new general council to enact much needed reforms in the church; it deprived the Pope of most of his rights in the Empire (26 March 1439) and announced a new diet to meet in Frankfurt in 1440.

The council of Ferrara was transferred to Florence on 10 January 1439, as a result of an outbreak of the plague. A union with the Eastern Orthodox Church was effected on 6 July 1439, with the bull "Laetentur caeli", which, as the result of political necessities, proved but a temporary bolster to the papacy's prestige. This union was followed by others of even less stability. Eugene IV signed an agreement with the Armenians on 22 November 1439, and with a part of the Jacobites of Syria in 1443, and in 1445 he received some of the Nestorians and the Maronites. He did his best to stem the Turkish advance, pledging one-fifth of the papal income to a crusade which set out in 1443, but which was overwhelmingly defeated at the Battle of Varna. Cardinal Cesarini, the papal legate, perished in the rout.

In Florence, on 18 December 1439, Pope Eugene held a consistory for the appointment of new cardinals, his third. Seventeen cardinals were named, and they received their titles on 8 January 1440.

Pope Eugene decreed on 26 April 1441 that his Council was to be transferred from Florence to Rome.

Eugene's rival, Felix V, in the meantime obtained scant recognition, even in the Holy Roman Empire. Eventually Emperor Frederick III moved toward acceptance of Eugene. One of the king's ablest advisers, the humanist Aeneas Sylvius Piccolomini, who was later to be Pope Pius II, made peace with Eugene in 1442. The Pope's recognition of the claim to Naples of King Alfonso V of Aragon (in the treaty of Terracina, approved by Eugene at Siena somewhat later) led to withdrawal of the last important Italian support from the Council of Basel. In 1442 Eugene, Alfonso and Visconti sent Niccolò Piccinino to reconquer the March of Ancona from Francesco Sforza; but the defeat of the allied army at the Battle of Montolmo pushed the Pope to reconcile with Sforza.

So enabled, Eugene IV made a formal entry into Rome on 28 September 1443, after an exile of nearly ten years. At the Piazza Colonna he was greeted by the shouts of the crowd, "Long live the church! Down with the new taxes and those who invented them."

His protests against the Pragmatic Sanction of Bourges were ineffectual, but by means of the Concordat of the Princes, negotiated by Aeneas Silvius Piccolomini, the secretary of Frederick III, with the electors in February 1447, the whole of Germany declared against the antipope. This agreement was completed only after Eugene's death.

=== Slavery ===
Christianity had gained many converts in the Canary Islands by the early 1430s. However, the ownership of the lands had been the subject of dispute between the Crown of Castile and the Kingdom of Portugal. The lack of effective control had resulted in periodic raids on the islands to procure slaves. As early as the Council of Koblenz in 922, the capture of Christians as slaves by other Christians had been condemned.

Acting on a complaint by Fernando Calvetos, bishop of the islands, Pope Eugene IV issued a papal bull, "Creator Omnium", on 17 December 1434, annulling previous permission granted to Portugal to conquer those islands rescinding any right to Christianize the natives of the island. Eugene excommunicated anyone who enslaved newly converted Christians, the penalty to stand until the captives were restored to their liberty and possessions. In 1434, Eugene issued the bull Regimini Gregis Dominici, forbidding the enslavement of Christian Canarians, and followed this with an order to suspend further conquest in order to allow the Franciscans to continue their work peacefully.

Portuguese soldiers continued to raid the islands in 1435, and Eugene issued a further edict "Sicut Dudum" that prohibited wars being waged against the islands and affirming the ban on enslavement. Eugene condemned the enslavement of the peoples of the newly colonized Canary Islands and, under pain of excommunication, ordered all such slaves to be immediately set free. Eugene went on to say that, "If this is not done when the fifteen days have passed, they incur the sentence of excommunication by the act itself, from which they cannot be absolved, except at the point of death, even by the Holy See, or by any Spanish bishop, or by the aforementioned Ferdinand, unless they have first given freedom to these captive persons and restored their goods."

Eugene tempered "Sicut Dudum" in September 1436 with the issuance of a papal bull in response to complaints made by King Edward of Portugal that allowed the Portuguese to conquer any unconverted parts of the Canary Islands. According to Raiswell (1997), any Christian would be protected by the earlier edict, but the un-baptized were implicitly allowed to be enslaved.

Following the arrival of the first African captives in Lisbon in 1441, Prince Henry asked Eugene to designate Portugal's raids along the West African coast as a crusade, a consequence of which would be the legitimization of enslavement for captives taken during the crusade. On 19 December 1442, Eugene replied by issuing the bull Illius qui se pro divini, in which he granted full remission of sins to members of the Order of Christ and those enrolled under their banner who took part in any expeditions against the Saracens and enemies of Christianity. In 1443, in the bull "Rex regum", the Pope took a neutral position on territorial disputes between Portugal and Castile regarding rights claimed in Africa.

Richard Raiswell interprets the bulls of Eugene as helping in some way the development of thought which perceived the enslavement of Africans by the Portuguese and later Europeans "as dealing a blow for Christendom". Joel S Panzer views Sicut Dudum as a significant condemnation of slavery, issued sixty years before the Europeans found the New World.

=== Jews ===
Eugene initially favored the Jews, issuing decrees protecting their rights, opposing forced baptisms, and permitting wider economic activities. However, political considerations, particularly pressure from the Council of Basel and his desire to secure Spanish loyalty, led him to issue the hostile bull Dudum ad nostram in 1442, which severely restricted Jewish life. Ultimately, this bull was not enforced during his lifetime, and shortly before his death, Eugene IV reaffirmed his opposition to forced conversions in Spain, suggesting a return to his earlier, more tolerant stance.

== Death and legacy ==
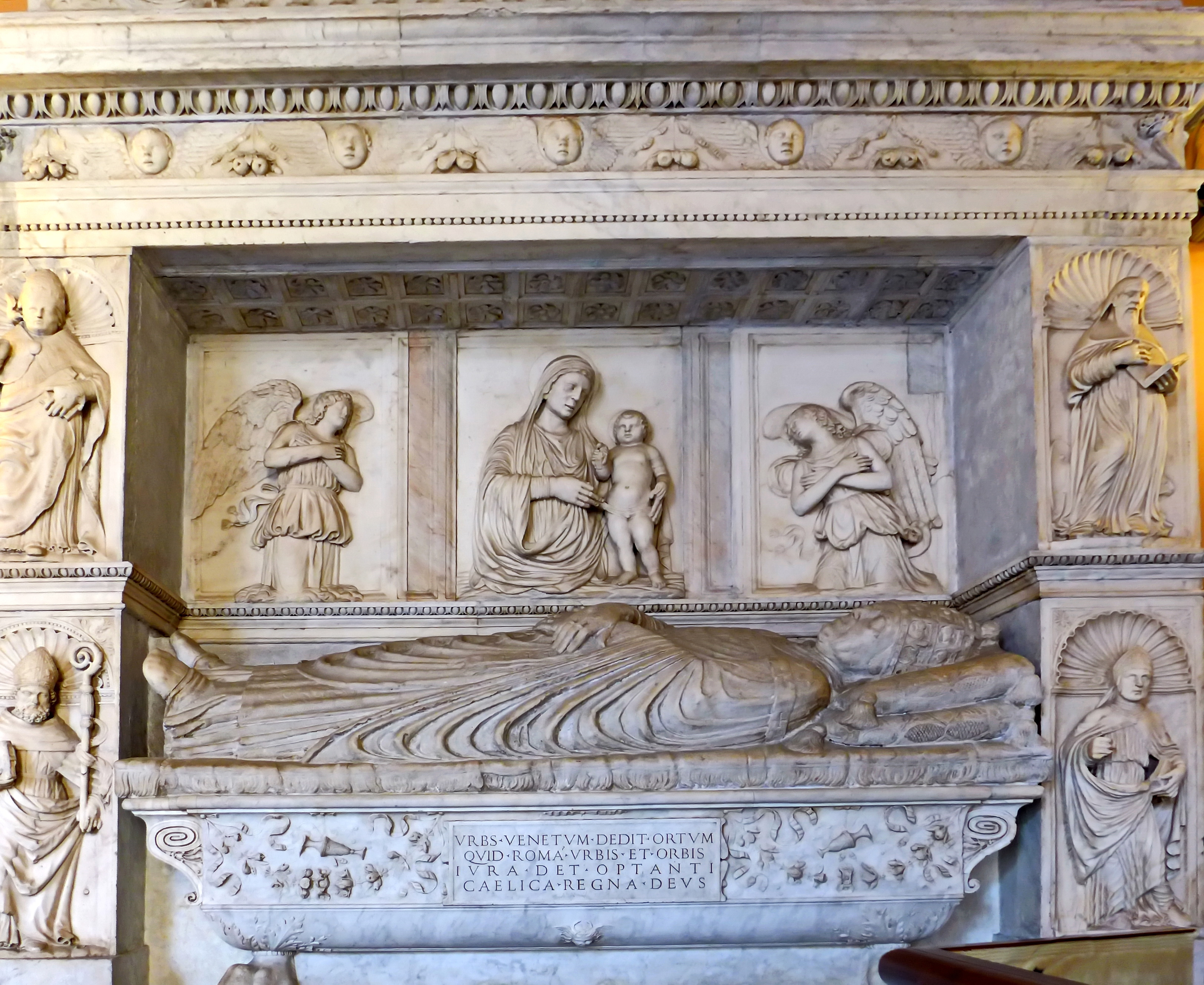
The tomb of Pope Eugene IV in San Salvatore in Lauro

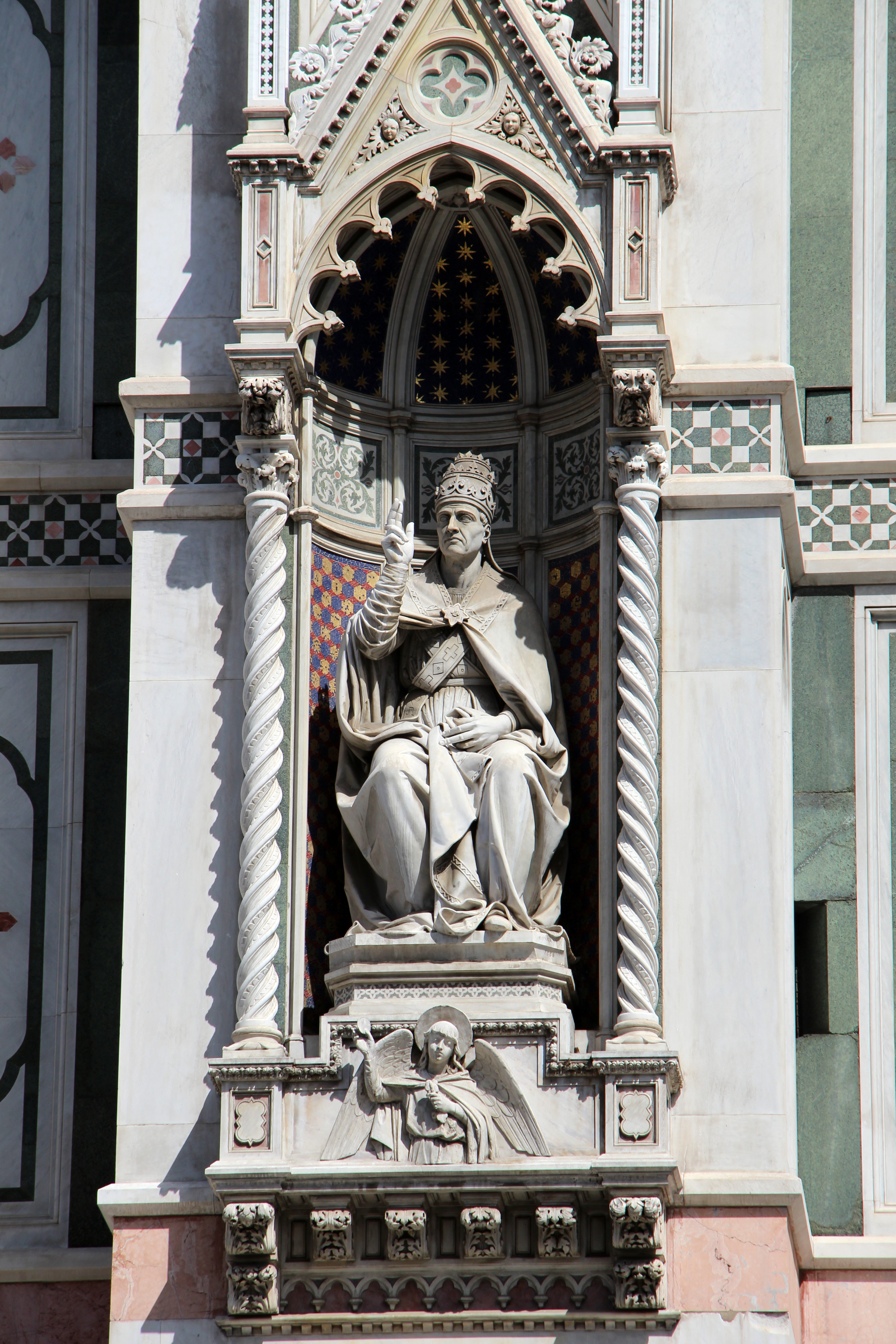
Statue of Pope Eugene at the Florence Cathedral

Although his pontificate had been so stormy and unhappy that he is said to have regretted on his deathbed that he ever left his monastery, Eugene IV's victory over the Council of Basel and his efforts on behalf of church unity nevertheless contributed greatly to the breakdown of the conciliar movement and restored the papacy to a semblance of the dominant position it had held before the Western Schism (1378–1417). This victory had been gained, however, by making concessions to the princes of Europe. Thereafter, the papacy had to depend more for its revenues on the Papal States.

Eugene was dignified in demeanour, but inexperienced and vacillating in action and excitable in temper. Bitter in his hatred of heresy, he nevertheless displayed great kindness to the poor. He laboured to reform the monastic orders, especially the Franciscans, and was never guilty of excessive nepotism. Although austere in his private life, he was a sincere friend of art and learning, and in 1431 he re-established the university at Rome. He also consecrated Florence Cathedral on 25 March 1436.

Eugene died in Rome on 23 February 1447, and was buried at Saint Peter's by the tomb of Pope Eugene III. Later his tomb was transferred to San Salvatore in Lauro, a parish church on the other bank of the Tiber River.

== Fictional depictions ==
- Eugene is portrayed by David Bamber in the 2016 television series Medici: Masters of Florence.

== See also ==
- Cardinals created by Eugene IV
- List of popes

== Bibliography ==
- Christianson, Gerald (1979). Cesarini, the Conciliar Cardinal: The Basel Years, 1431–1438. St. Ottilien: EOS-Verlag, 1979.
- Creighton, Mandell (1882). A History of the Papacy During the Period of the Reformation. Volume 2. Boston: Houghton, Mifflin & Company, 1882.
- Decaluwe, Michiel (2010). A Successful Defeat. Eugenius IV's Struggle with the Council of Basel for Ultimate Authority in the Church, 1431/1449. Institut Historique Belge de Rome, 2009; Brepols Publishers, 2010. ISBN 978-90-74461-73-3.
- Eubel, Conradus, ed. (1913). Hierarchia catholica (in Latin). Vol. 1 (Tomus I) (second ed.). Münster: Libreria Regensbergiana. pp. 269–270. archived.
- Eubel, Conradus, ed. (1914). Hierarchia catholica (in Latin). Vol. 2 (Tomus II) (second ed.). Münster: Libreria Regensbergiana. archived
- Dulles SJ, Avery, "Development or Reversal?", First Things Magazine, October 2005. (Subscription required).
- Gill, Joseph (1961). Eugenius IV, Pope of Christian Union. Westminster, Md., Newman Press, 1961.
- Gregorovius, Ferdinand (1900). History of the city of Rome in the Middle Ages. Volume 7, Part 1. London: G Bell & Sons, 1909.
- Hay, Denys (1993). "Eugenio IV, papa," in: Dizionario Biografico degli Italiani, Volume 43 (1993).
- Maxwell, John Francis. Slavery and the Catholic Church, Barry Rose Publishers, 1975.
- Müntz, Eugène (1878). Les artes a la cour des Papes pendant le XV^{e} e le XVI^{e} siècle (Paris: Thorin 1878), pp. 32–67.
- Panzer, Joel S. (2008). "The Popes and Slavery", The Church In History Centre, 22 April 2008.
- Pastor, Ludwig (1891). The History of the Popes, from the Close of the Middle Ages: Drawn from the Secret Archives of the Vatican and Other Original Sources. Volume 1. London: Kegan Paul, Trench, Trübner, 1891. (pp. 282–361)
- A Violent Evangelism, Luis N. Rivera, Luis Rivera Pagán, Westminster John Knox Press, 1992, ISBN 0-664-25367-9
- Stieber, Joachim W. (1978). Pope Eugene IV, the council of Basel, and the secular and ecclesiastical authorities in the Empire: the conflict over supreme authority and power in the Church. Leiden: Brill 1978.

=== For further reading ===
- Piccolomini, Aeneas Sylvius (Pope Pius II). Aeneae Sylvii De Picolominibus episcopi Tergestini De rebus Basileae gestis stante vel dissoluto concilio commentarius primitus e bibliotheca Vaticana in lucem editus praeposito proemio, subjectis adnotationibus cura Michaelis Catalani canonici Ecclesiae Firmanae. (in Latin). Fermo: apud Jos. Alexandrum Paccasassium, 1803.
- Rendina, Claudio (1994). I capitani di ventura. Rome: Newton Compton. p. 355.
- Sued-Badillo, Jalil, Christopher Columbus and the enslavement of the Amerindians in the Caribbean. (Columbus and the New World Order 1492–1992)., NYC: Monthly Review. Monthly Review Foundation, Inc. 1992. HighBeam Research. 10 August 2009.
- The Historical Encyclopedia of World Slavery, Contributor Richard Raiswell, Editor Junius P. Rodriguez, ABC-CLIO, 1997, ISBN 0-87436-885-5
- Davidson, Basil (1961). The African Slave Trade. James Currey Publishers, 1961. ISBN 0-85255-798-1

Catholic Church titles
Preceded by Martin V	Pope; 11 March 1431 – 23 February 1447	Succeeded by Nicholas V
