= Christ as the Suffering Redeemer (Mantegna) =

Painting by Andrea Mantegna

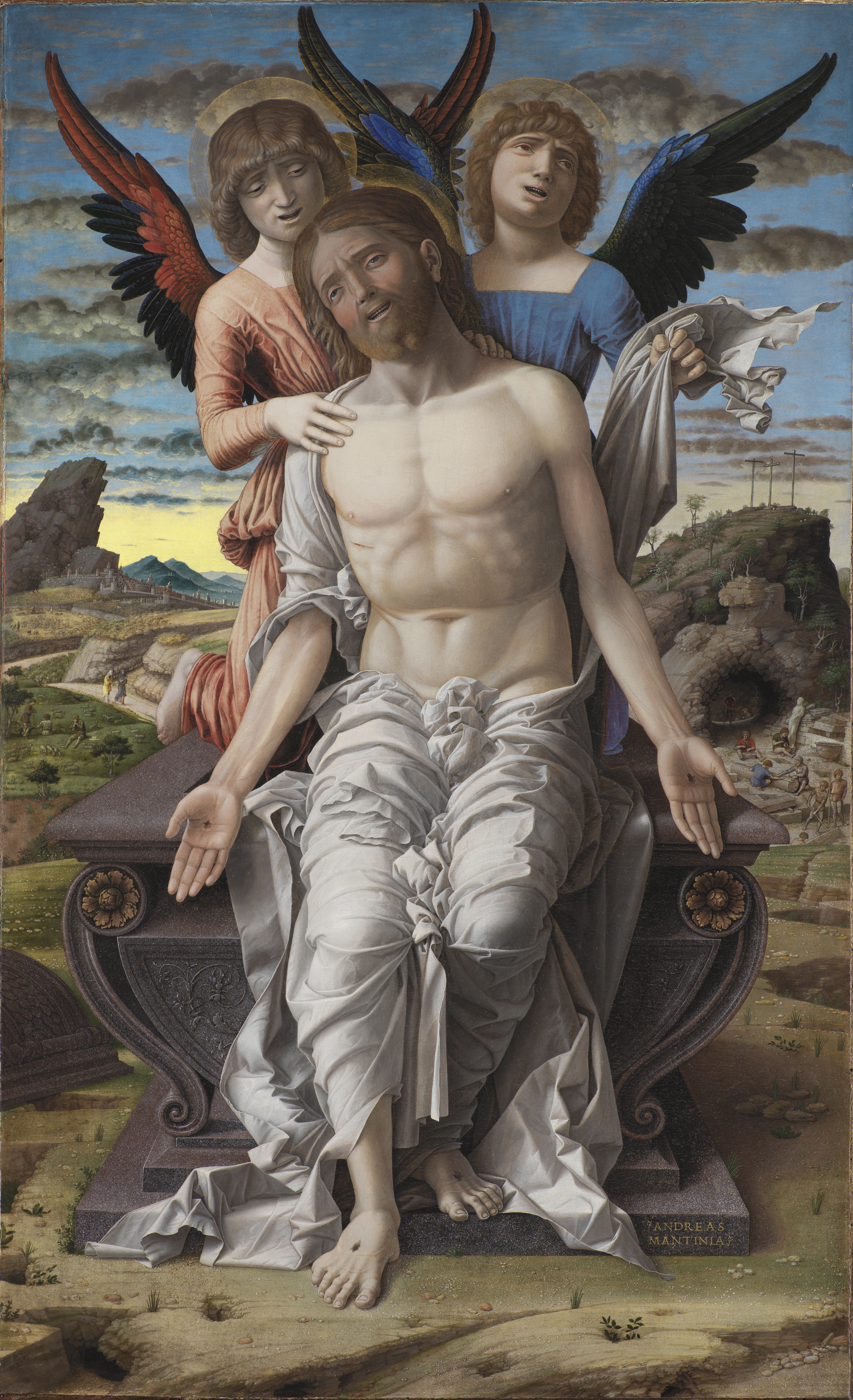
- Artist: Andrea Mantegna
- Year: 1488–1500
- Medium: Tempera on panel
- Dimensions: 78 cm × 48 cm (31 in × 19 in)
- Location: Statens Museum for Kunst, Copenhagen

The Christ as the Suffering Redeemer is a painting by the Italian Renaissance artist Andrea Mantegna, dated to c. 1488–1500 and housed in the Statens Museum for Kunst, Copenhagen, Denmark.

== History ==
The work is generally assigned to Mantegna's stay in Rome, due to stylistic similarities with the Madonna of the Quarry, although other art historians considered it from the 1490s.

The painting appears in an inventory of the Gonzaga family from 1627, and it belonged to Cardinal Silvio Valenti Gonzaga in 1763 when it became part of the Danish Royal Collection, having been acquired by King Frederick IV of Denmark to make his collection equal to those of other European reigning families.

== Description ==
The painting is signed on the edge of the marble base. Christ, portrayed with open hands to show all the wounds of the crucifixion, is raised on finely sculpted ancient sarcophagus.

His body is wrapped in a metallic white drape, and his supported by two kneeling angels (a seraphim and a cherubim). On the left the tomb's cover is visible, while the background is occupied by a far landscape under the sunset light. On the right is the Calvary and a quarry in which two men are working a slab, a column and a statue. Two further workers can be seen in a grotto, illuminated by an internal source of light. Finally, on the left are fields with shepherds and cattle and a walled city, Jerusalem, at the feet of a rocky spur. Two pious women run a path to reach Jesus' tomb.
