= Madonna and Child with Saint Jerome and Saint Louis of Toulouse =

c. 1455 painting by Andrea Mantegna

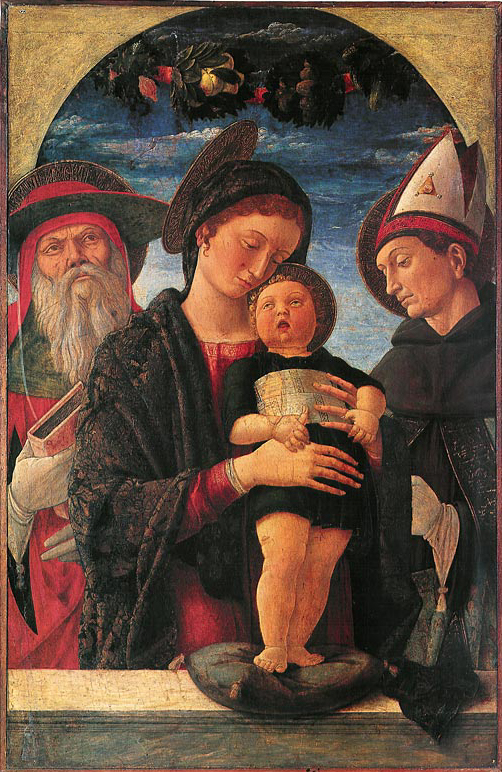

Madonna and Child with Saint Jerome and Saint Louis of Toulouse is a c.1455 tempera on panel painting by Andrea Mantegna. The work was acquired by Nélie Jacquemart, who left it to the Institut de France with the rest of her collection on her death in 1912 - it now hangs in the musée Jacquemart-André in Paris.

It is normally dated to after Mantegna's 1453 marriage to Jacopo Bellini's daughter (also Giovanni Bellini's sister) and shows such marked influences from Jacopo (such as presenting the Madonna and Child with two saints behind a parapet and below a garland of flowers) that its attribution to Mantegna has previously been contested, though Christ's strong facial features and the sharp focus on the figures in front of a deep background are both characteristic of Mantegna at that date.
