= Isola Mantegna =

Village in Veneto, northern Italy

Coordinates: 45°34′12″N 11°43′55″E

Isola Mantegna is a village within the comune (municipality) of Piazzola sul Brenta in Veneto, Italy. The town was initially named Isola di Carturo but changed its name to Isola Mantegna in 1963 to honor the notable Renaissance painter Andrea Mantegna, who was born there in 1431.

The village is in the Province of Padua, 23 kilometres (14 mi) northwest of Padua.

== History ==
In 1917-18, there was a World War I airfield in the fields nearby.

== Notable residents ==
- Andrea Mantegna (c. 1431—1506), painter
