= Saint Sebastian (Mantegna) =

Three paintings by Andrea Mantegna

Saint Sebastian is the subject of three paintings by the Italian Early Renaissance master Andrea Mantegna. The Paduan artist lived in a period of frequent plagues; Sebastian was considered protector against the plague as he had been shot through by arrows, and it was thought that plague spread abroad through the air. In his long stay in Mantua, Mantegna resided near the San Sebastiano church dedicated to Saint Sebastian. The three paintings are held by the Kunsthistorisches Museum in Vienna, the Louvre in Paris, and the Ca' d'Oro in Venice.

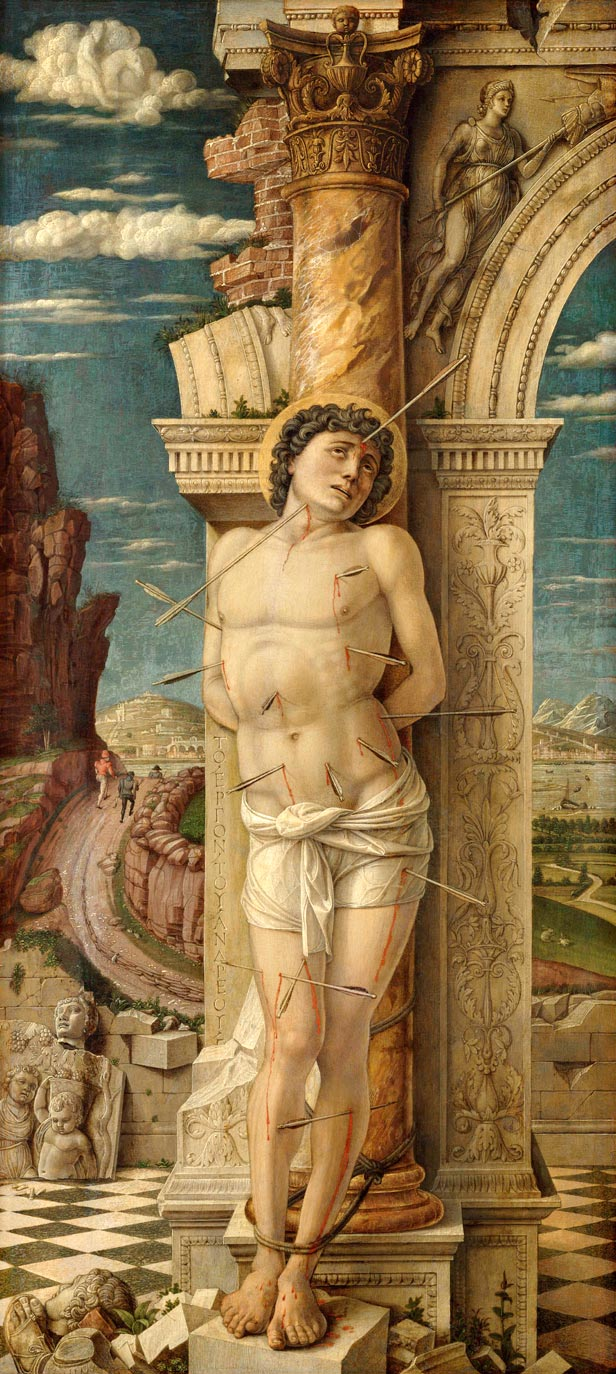
c. 1470, Vienna

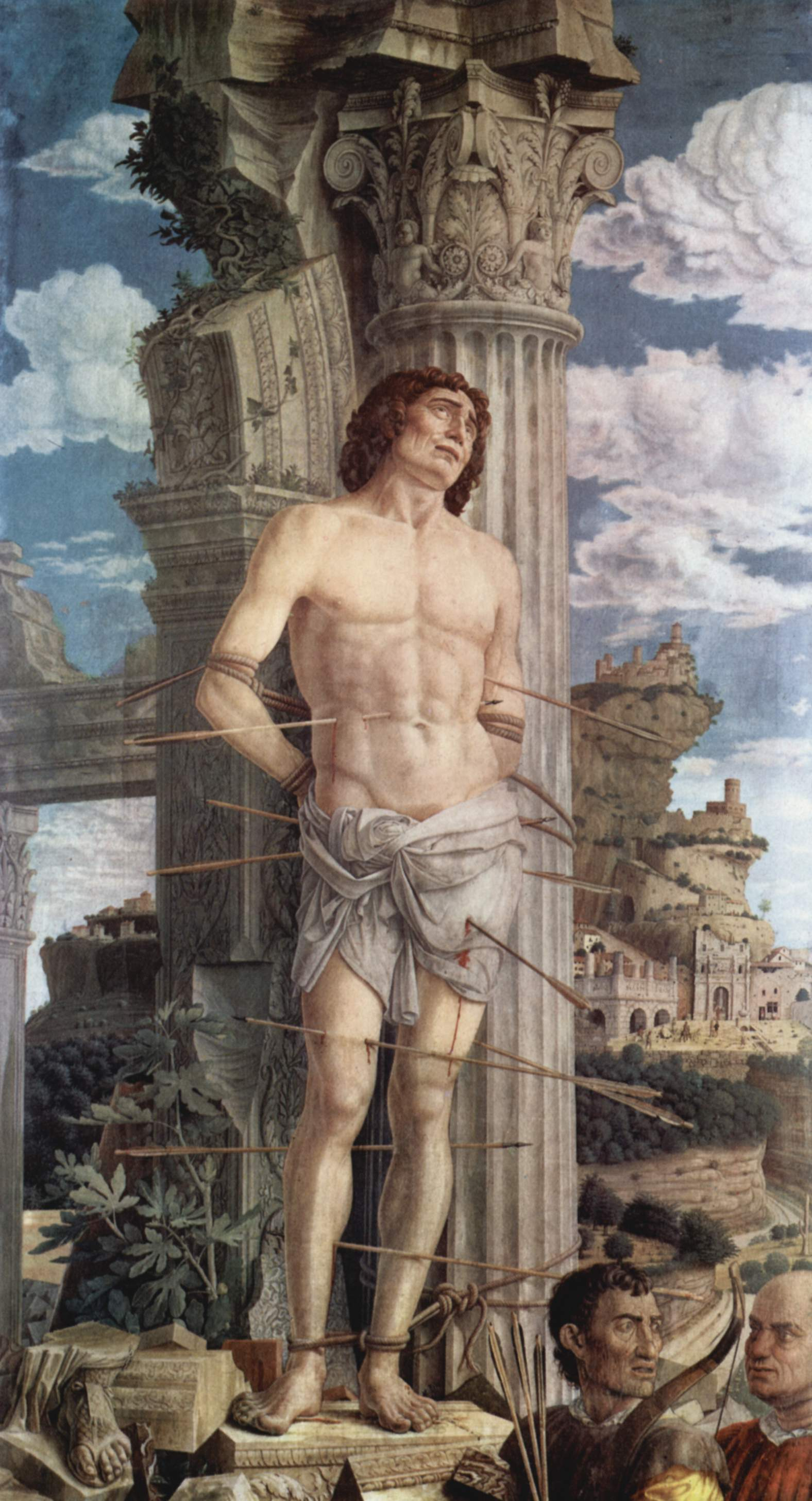
c. 1480, Paris

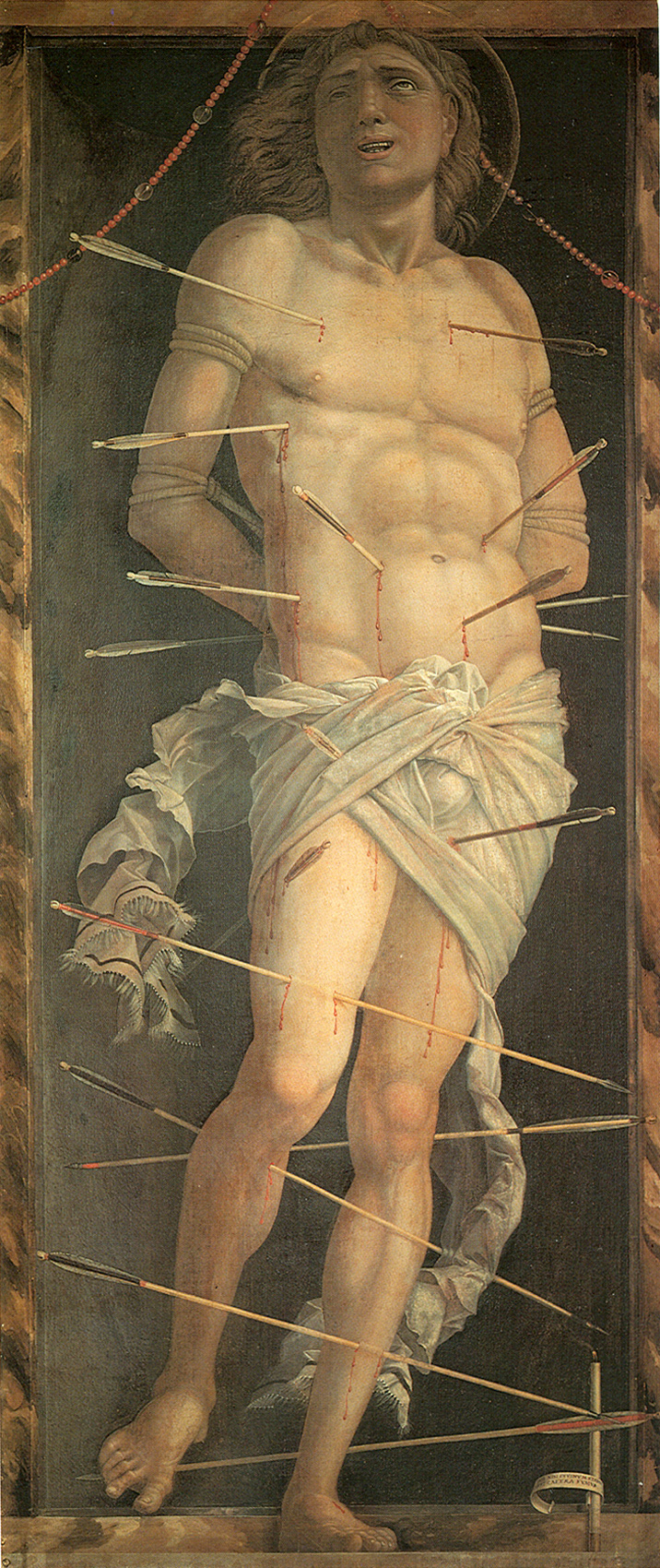
c. 1506, Venice

== The Saint Sebastian of Vienna ==
It has been suggested that the picture was made after Mantegna had recovered from the plague in Padua (1456–1457). Probably commissioned by the city's podestà to celebrate the end of the pestilence, it was finished before the artist left the city for Mantua.

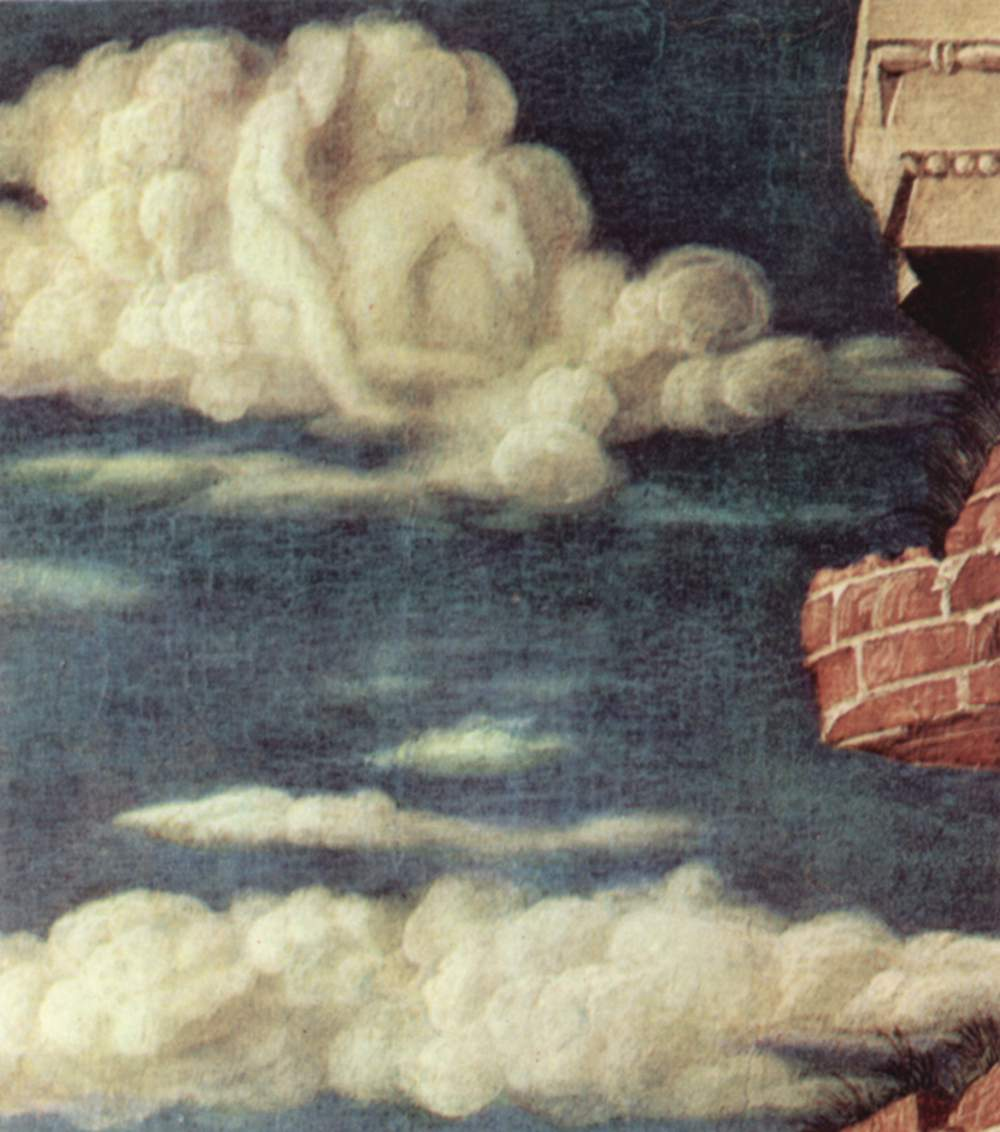
The rider in the cloud of the Vienna Saint Sebastian

According to Battisti, the theme refers to the Book of Revelation. A rider is present in the clouds at the upper left corner. As specified in Revelation, the cloud is white and the rider has a scythe, which he is using to cut the cloud. The rider has been interpreted as Saturn, the Roman god: in ancient times Saturn was identified with the Time that passed by and all left destroyed behind him.

Instead of the classical figure of Sebastian tied to a pole in the Rome's Campus Martius, the painter portrayed the saint against an arch, whether a triumphal arch or the gate of the city. In 1457 the painter had been put on trial for "artistic inadequacy" for having put only eight apostles in his fresco of the Assumption. As a reply, he therefore applied Alberti's principles of Classicism in the following pictures, including this small Saint Sebastian, though deformed by the nostalgic perspective of his own.

Characteristic of Mantegna is the clarity of the surface, the precision of an "archaeological" reproduction of the architectonical details, and the elegance of the martyr's posture.

The vertical inscription at the right side of the saint is the signature of Mantegna in Greek.

== The Saint Sebastian of the Louvre ==
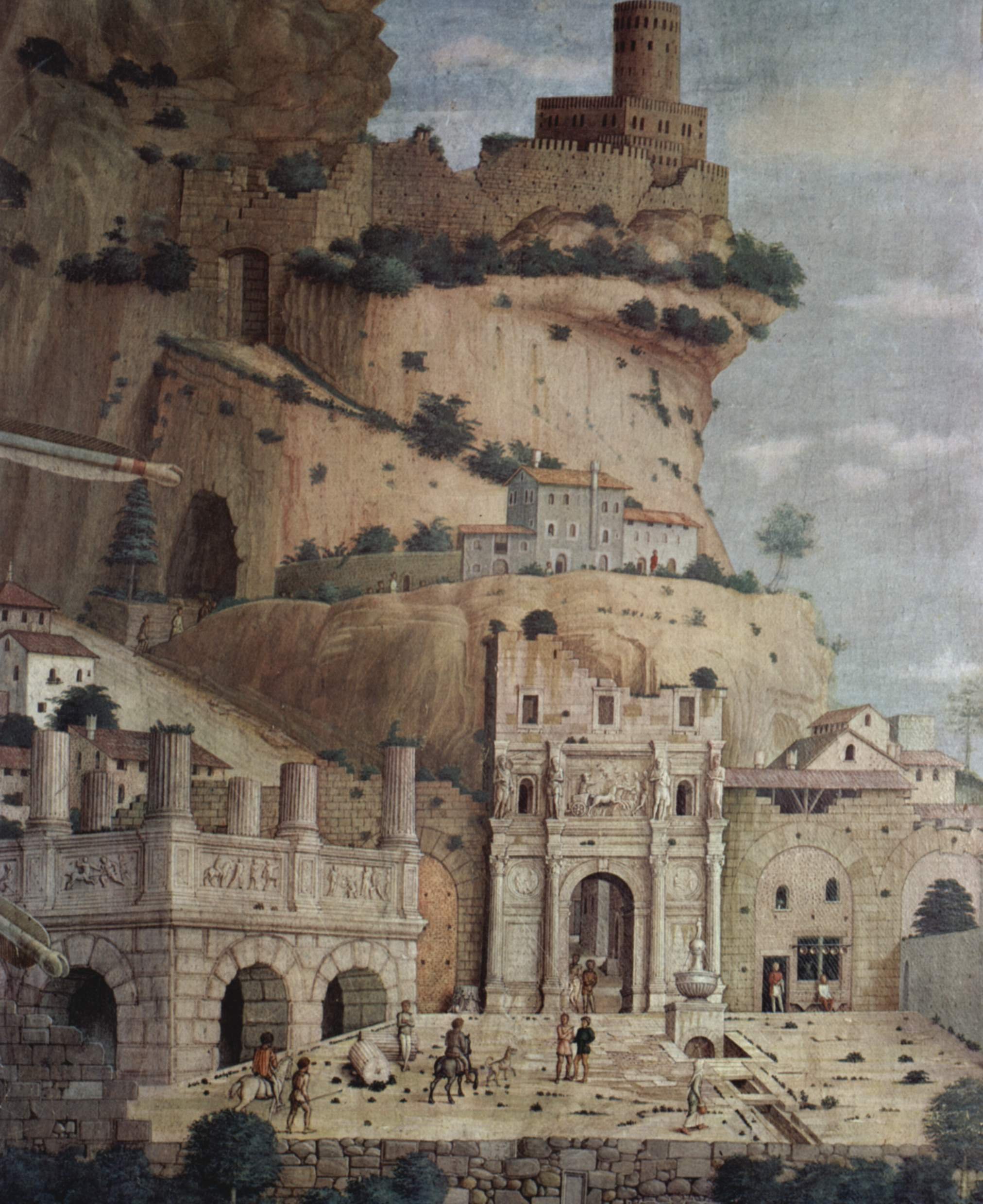
The classical ruins are typical of Mantegna's pictures. The cliffy path, the gravel and the caves are references to the difficulties of reaching the Heavenly Jerusalem, the fortified city depicted on the top of the mountain, at the upper right corner of the picture, and described in Chapter 21 of the Book of Revelation.

The Louvre's Saint Sebastian was once part of the Altar of San Zeno in Verona. In the late 17th to early 18th centuries it was recorded in the Sainte Chapelle of Aigueperse, in the Auvergne region of France: its presence there is related to the marriage of Chiara Gonzaga, daughter of Federico I of Mantua, with Gilbert de Bourbon, Dauphin d'Auvergne (1486).

The picture presumably illustrates the theme of God's Athlete, inspired to a spurious sermon by Saint Augustine. The saint, again tied to a classical arch, is observed from an unusual, low perspective, used by the artist to enhance the impression of solidity and dominance of his figure. The head and eyes turned toward Heaven confirm Sebastian's firmness in bearing the martyrdom. At his feet two iniquitous people (represented by a pair of archers) are shown: these are intended to create a contrast between the man of transcendent faith and those who are only attracted by profane pleasures.

Apart from the symbolism, the picture is characterized by Mantegna's accuracy in the depictions of ancient ruins, as well as the detail in realistic particulars such as the fig tree next to the column and the description of Sebastian's body.

== The Saint Sebastian of Venice ==
The third Saint Sebastian by Mantegna was painted some years later (c. 1490 or even 1506), although some art historians date it to around the same time as the Triumphs of Caesar or even earlier due to the fictive marble cornice, reminiscent of the painter's time in Padua. It is now in the Galleria Franchetti in Venice. It is quite different from the previous compositions, shows a marked pessimism. The grandiose, tortured figure of the saint is depicted before a neutral, shallow background in brown colour. The artist's intentions for the work are explained by a banderole spiralling around an extinguished candle, in the lower right corner. Here, in Latin, is written: Nihil nisi divinum stabile est. Caetera fumus ("Nothing is stable except the divine. The rest is smoke"). The inscription may have been necessary because the theme of life's fleetingness was not usually associated with pictures of Sebastian. The "M" letter formed by the crossing arrows over the saint's legs could stand for Morte ("Death") or Mantegna.

It can be identified as one of the works remaining in the artist's studio after his death in 1506. In the first half of the 16th century the work was in Pietro Bembo's house in Padua, where it was seen by Marcantonio Michiel. Via cardinal Bembo's heirs, in 1810, it was acquired by the anatomist and surgeon Antonio Scarpa for his collection in Pavia. On his death in 1832, the painting was inherited by his brother and then his nephew in Motta di Livenza (Treviso), where it remained until 1893, when it was acquired by Baron Giorgio Franchetti for the Ca' d'Oro, which he left to the city of Venice with its contents in 1916.

== Bibliography (in Italian) ==
- Anonimo (Marcantonio Michiel), Notizia d'opere di disegno, a cura di Jacopo Morelli, Bassano, 1800.
- Alberta De Nicolò Salmazo, Mantegna, Electa, Milano 1997.
- Tatjana Pauli, Mantegna, serie Art Book, Leonardo Arte, Milano 2001. ISBN 9788883101878
- Ettore Camesasca, Mantegna, in Various authors, Pittori del Rinascimento, Scala, Firenze 2007. ISBN 888117099X
- Sergio Momesso, La collezione di Antonio Scarpa, 1752–1832, Bertoncello, Cittadella (Padova), 2007. ISBN 9788886868242
- Zuffi, Stefano (1991). Mantegna. Arnoldo Mondadori.
