= Lamentation of Christ (Mantegna) =

Painting by Andrea Mantegna

The Lamentation over the Dead Christ
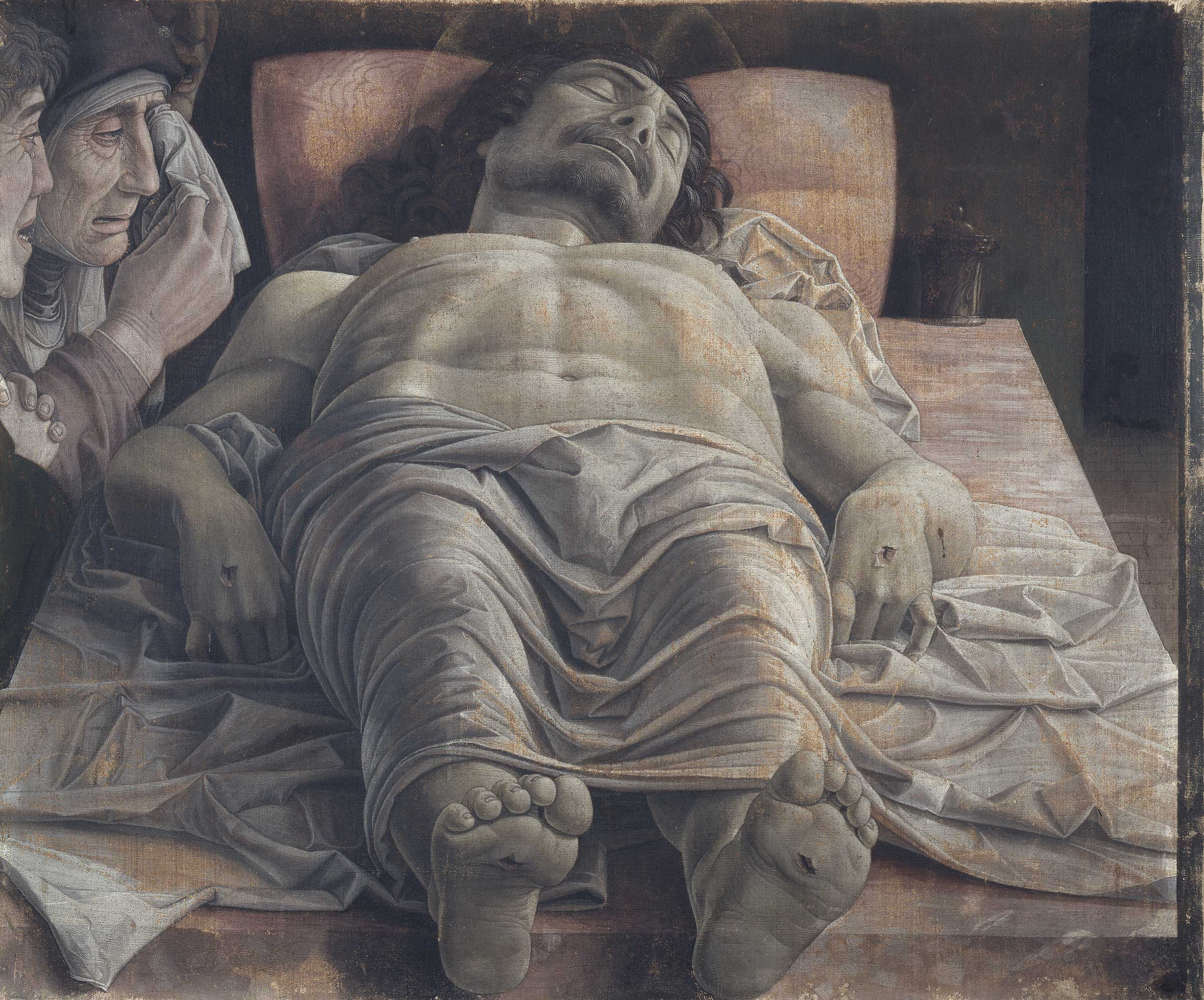
- Artist: Andrea Mantegna
- Year: c. 1480
- Medium: Tempera on canvas
- Dimensions: 68 cm × 81 cm (27 in × 32 in)
- Location: Pinacoteca di Brera; Milan

The Lamentation of Christ (also known as the Lamentation over the Dead Christ, The Foreshortened Christ, or the Dead Christ and Three Mourners and other variants) is a painting by the Italian Renaissance artist Andrea Mantegna. It portrays the body of Christ supine on a marble slab. He is watched over by the Virgin Mary, Saint John and St. Mary Magdalene weeping for his death. While the dating of the piece is debated, it was completed between 1475 and 1501, probably in the early 1480s. The painting is currently at the Pinacoteca di Brera in Milan.

== Subject ==
The Lamentation of Christ is a topic in Christian religious art, especially popular in the High Medieval, Renaissance, and Baroque periods, which depicts the moment of mourning following the Crucifixion and lowering of Christ's body from the cross. Mantegna's variant includes some aspects commonly associated with the scene, including the presence of Mary and John as mourners and the presentation of the body on the Stone of Unction. The painting shows the nail wounds in Christ's feet and hands and, though less pronounced, the spear wound on his side.

== Visual impact ==
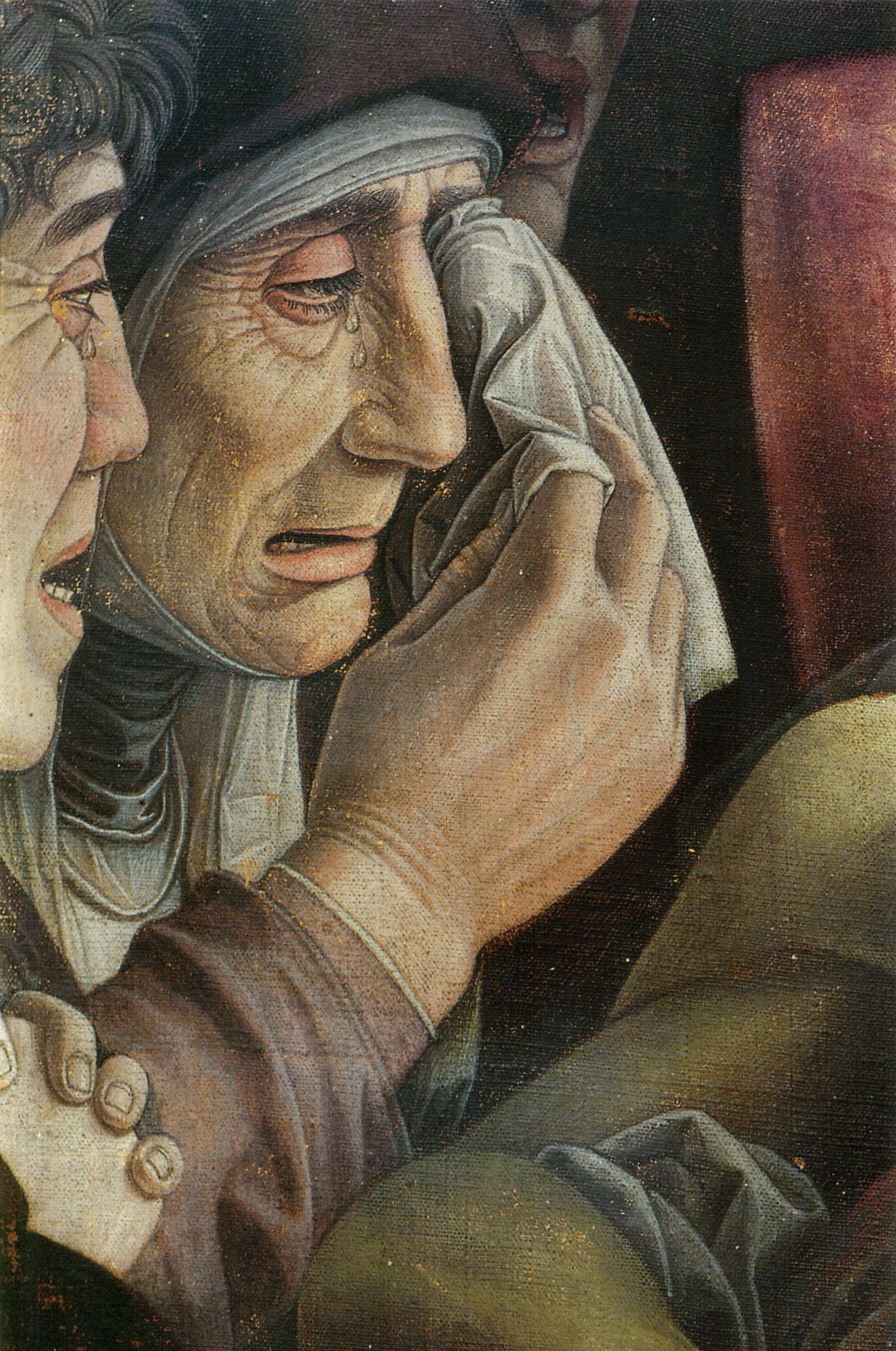
Detail of the mourners in the corner diagonal of the painting.

Mantegna's painting is visually distinct and shocking. Herbert von Einem called it "almost spooky" in its depiction of 'a horrendously distorted corpse' confined in a narrow space. There is little contact between the mourners and the body. Rich contrasts of light and shadow abound, its dark, monochromatic browns infusing the image with a profound sense of pathos. The realism and tragedy of the scene are enhanced by the perspective, which foreshortens and dramatizes the recumbent figure, stressing the anatomical details, as well as the holes in Christ's hands and feet and the faces of the three mourners. The sharply drawn drapery which covers the corpse contributes to the dramatic effect. The space the figures are present in appears to be confined, small, and somber, indicating it to be a morgue.

== Use of perspective ==
One of the piece's most distinctive features is the severe angle of the composition, which, when displayed at eye level, places the theoretical viewer at the feet of the dramatically foreshortened figure. The use of perspective also creates the illusion that the face of Christ follows the viewer depending on the angle from which the piece is viewed.

By the way Christ is painted, viewers have difficulty in pinpointing the real dimensions of Christ’s body. Art historian Hubert Schrade pointed out, “the agitation of dimension of the work, which allows immediate proximity but denies any intimacy.” Mantegna also reduced the size of the figure's feet, which would cover much of the body if represented true to size.

There are several theories about the reason for this apparent discrepancy. The composition does not fully adhere to the rules of linear perspective, so there is no upright vantage point from which the figure is foreshortened 'correctly.' This has led to Paul Kristeller speculate that the painting is a study in foreshortening as seen from below, due to the similarities between the proportions of the lying Christ and the putti and other figures in the circular trompe-l'œil in the Camera degli Sposi. Compared to a model photographed mimicking the pose, Christ's feet appear smaller and the torso more pronounced. John Ward proposed that the discrepancy in proportions may not have been visible to the artist, who was transcribing his perception of multiple planes onto a two-dimensional canvas, such that every part of the figure's body remains the focal point to a scanning eye. John White referred to Mantegna as a "protagonist of theoretical perspective," and German scholar Hans Jantzen proposed that the impossible vantage point creates drama and expressiveness rather than technical accuracy. In directing the viewer, the orthogonal lines carry more symbolic value than structural. Joseph Manca likewise believed that keeping the proportions of the body accurate would take away from the drama and empathy of the scene.

== Significance of the pose ==
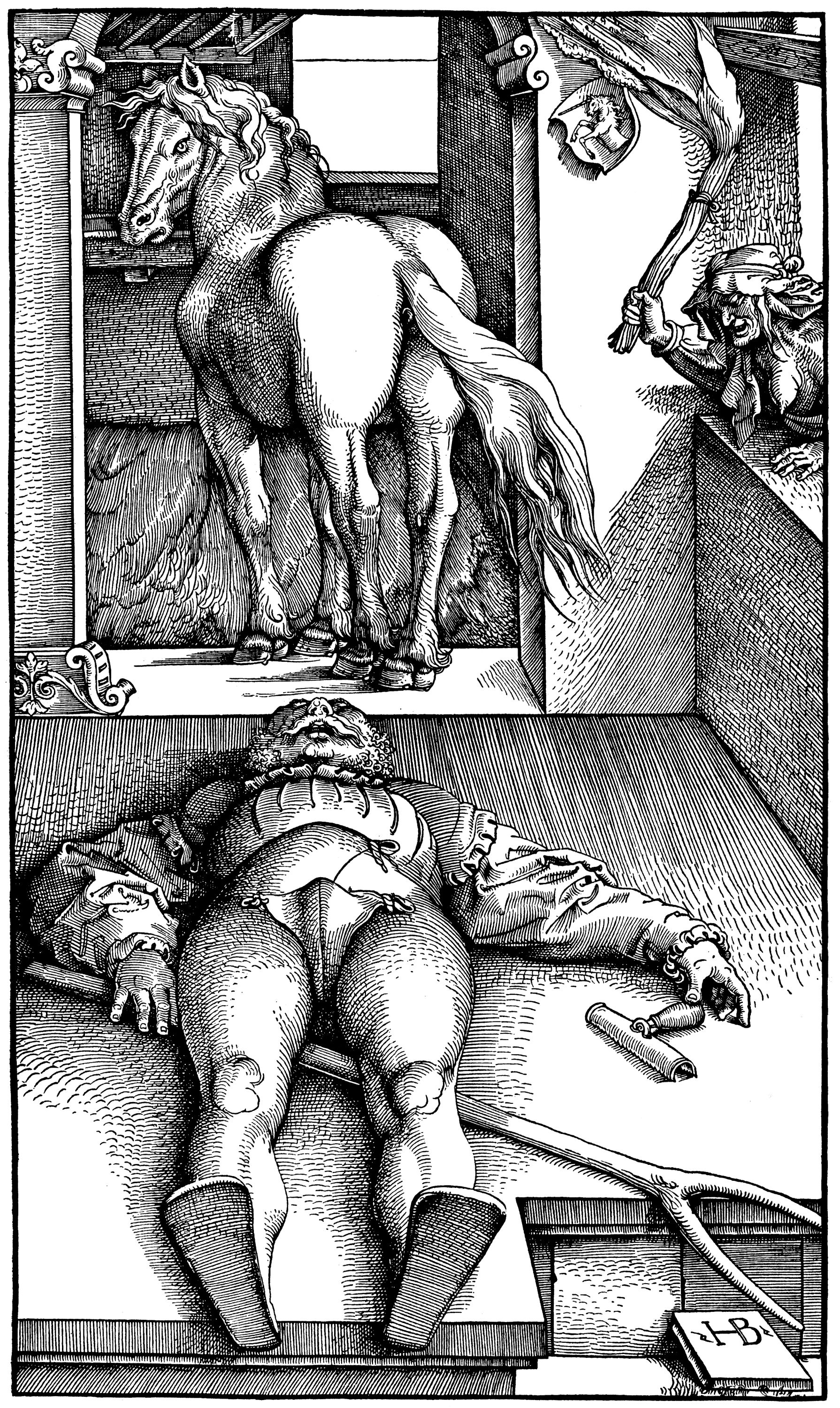
The Bewitched Groom shows a similarly foreshortened figure in a more typical context for the pose.

The composition and the distinct view it provides of its subject is also a topic for scholarly discussion. Colin Eisler noted that the image centers on Christ's genitals – an emphasis often found in figures of Jesus, which has been related to a theological emphasis on the Humanity of Jesus by Leo Steinberg and others.

One symbolic meaning of a subject being presented feet first in perspective is to indicate that the individual has lost a battle or war. However, it is usually meant to imply that the individual is a degenerate or a loser affected by unfortunate events, such as a flood, or misfortune. Here, however, Mantegna paints one of the most holy figures in such a position.

== Analysis ==
Being placed at eye level at Christ’s feet, directly in front of his open wounds, invites the viewers to remember the reason for his death. Mantegna presented both a harrowing study of a strongly foreshortened cadaver and an intensely poignant depiction of a biblical tragedy. The portrayal of Jesus Christ's suffering prior to this event is meant to inspire not only pain, but hope. The idea of scherzo, a musical term referring to the lighthearted, playful segment of a symphony, is present in this scene, invoking slight lightness, hope, and promise in anticipation of Christ's future resurrection. The painting is another mirror to the Middle Ages inscriptions on images related to a Christ on the cross or the Passion of the Lord that would say, “Aspice qui transis, quia tu mihi causa doloris (look here, you who are passing by, for you are the cause of my pain).” In addition to being in front of his open injuries, the fabric Christ lies on indicates that this is the time to mourn before he is to be buried. The stone Christ lies on is also known as the Stone of Unction, or the Stone of Anointing, and is the slab onto which Christ's body was laid after being crucified. Viewers are meant to feel that they cannot reach out and touch his body, Shrade noted: "None of the mourners dare touch the corpse, He is untouchable."

The three mourners are off to the side, separate from the main figure of Christ. According to Niny Garavaglia, this has led to a debate about whether the mourners are a later addition or an incongruous element. Matteo Marangoni believed it to be "out of keeping" with Mantegna's style, but this is not a widely accepted belief.

== Initial fate and provenance ==
The Lamentation was counted among Mantegna's possessions at the time of his death. This has led some art historians, such as Roberto Longhi and Ettore Camesasca, to categorize the piece as one of Mantegna's later works, while others, namely Henry Thode and Paul Kristeller, date it earlier in his career.

=== Possible copy ===
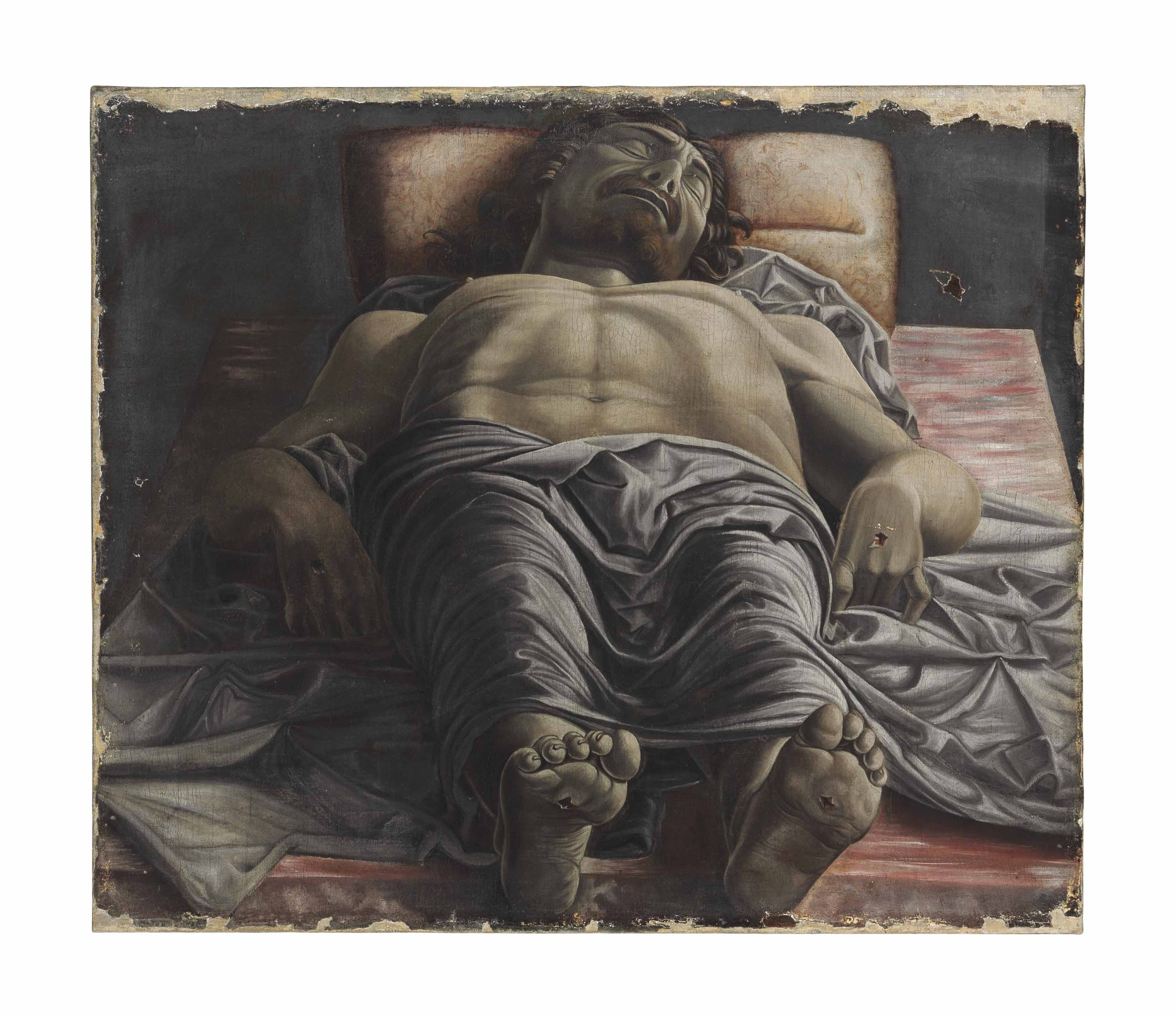
A different version of the painting, with mourners absent.

A version of The Foreshortened Christ with several differences, most notably the absence of the mourners, was announced in Art In America, 1941 as having been rediscovered in the United States. H. Tietze claimed it to be the original discovered in Mantegna's study. This version is overwhelmingly believed to be a copy.

=== History ===
Due in part to competing claims regarding the two versions, the exact provenance of the piece is somewhat murky. The painting may have been rejected by its original patron, possibly Ercole d'Este, for its jarring intensity, or because the angle and composition of the piece broke too much with convention for a lamentation scene. Lorenzo Mantegna sold the piece to Cardinal Sigismondo Gonzaga with permission from Isabella d'Este, a long time patron of Mantegna. It was listed as a decoration for the rooms of Margherita Paleologa in 1531. By 1627, records place it in the 'Camerino delle Dame' where it likely remained until 1630 when much of the Mantua collection was stolen and sold off. The painting was next recorded in Rome, in the possession of Cardinal Mazarin. It came to Milan a century and a half later, under the ownership of the Bossi family, who sold it to the Pinacoteca di Brera, where it is currently displayed.

== Sources ==
- La Grande Storia dell'Arte – Il Quattrocento, Il Sole 24 Ore, 2005
- Kleiner, Frank S. Gardner's Art Through the Ages, 13th Edition, 2008
- Manca, Joseph. Andrea Mantegna and the Italian Renaissance, 2006
- Andrea Mantegna: Making Art (History). United Kingdom: Wiley, 2015.
- Johnston, Kenneth G. "Hemingway and Mantegna: The Bitter Nail Holes." The Journal of Narrative Technique 1, no. 2 (1971): 86–94. Accessed November 19, 2020. JSTOR 30224967.
