= Andrea Mantegna =

Italian Renaissance painter (1431–1506)

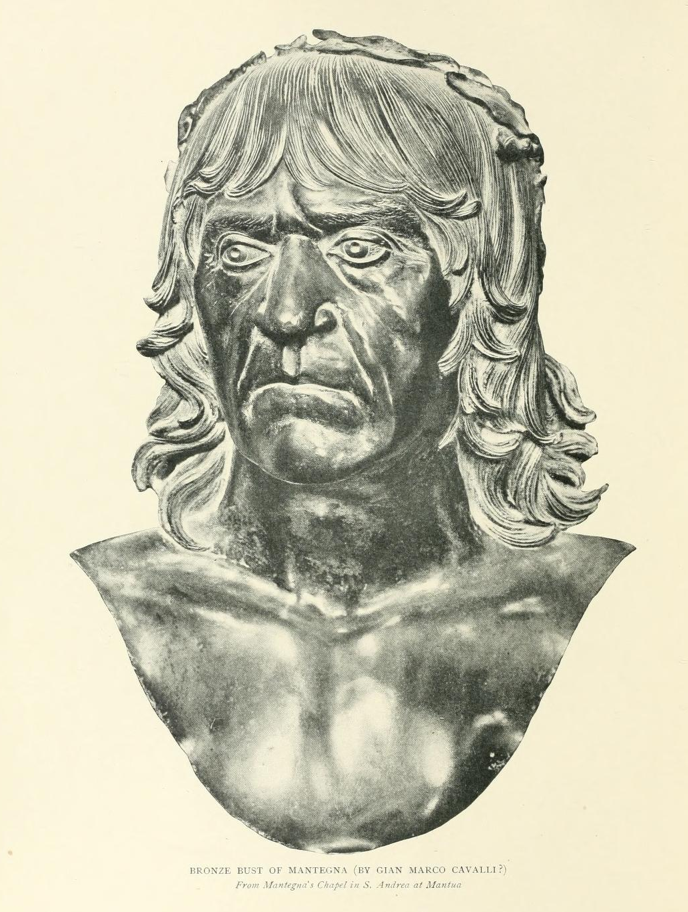
- Bust attributed to Gian Marco Cavalli
- Born: Andrea Mantegna c. 1431; Isola di Carturo, Venetian Republic (now Italy)
- Died: September 13, 1506 (aged 74–75); Mantua (now Italy)
- Education: Francesco Squarcione
- Known for: Painting, fresco
- Notable work: St. Sebastian; Camera degli Sposi; The Agony in the Garden; The Lamentation over the Dead Christ
- Movement: Italian Renaissance
- Spouse: Nicolosia Bellini

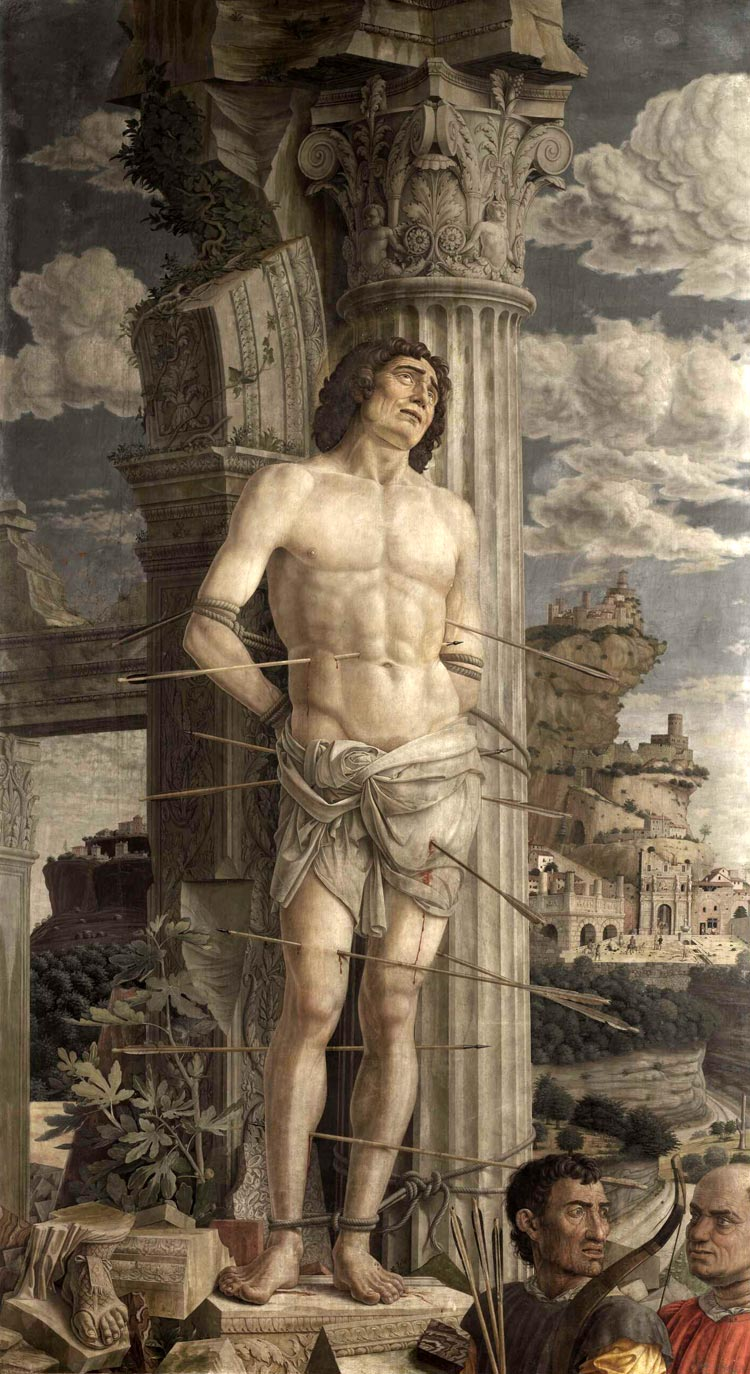
St. Sebastian, 1480; panel; Musée du Louvre

Andrea Mantegna (UK: /mænˈtɛnjə/, US: /mɑːnˈteɪnjə/; Italian: [anˈdrɛːa manˈteɲɲa]; c. 1431 – September 13, 1506) was an Italian Renaissance painter, a student of Roman archaeology, and the son-in-law of Jacopo Bellini.

Like other artists of the time, Mantegna experimented with perspective, e.g. by lowering the horizon in order to create a sense of greater monumentality. His flinty, metallic landscapes, and somewhat stony figures give evidence of a fundamentally sculptural approach to painting. He also led a workshop that was the leading producer of prints in Venice before 1500.

== Biography ==
=== Youth and education ===
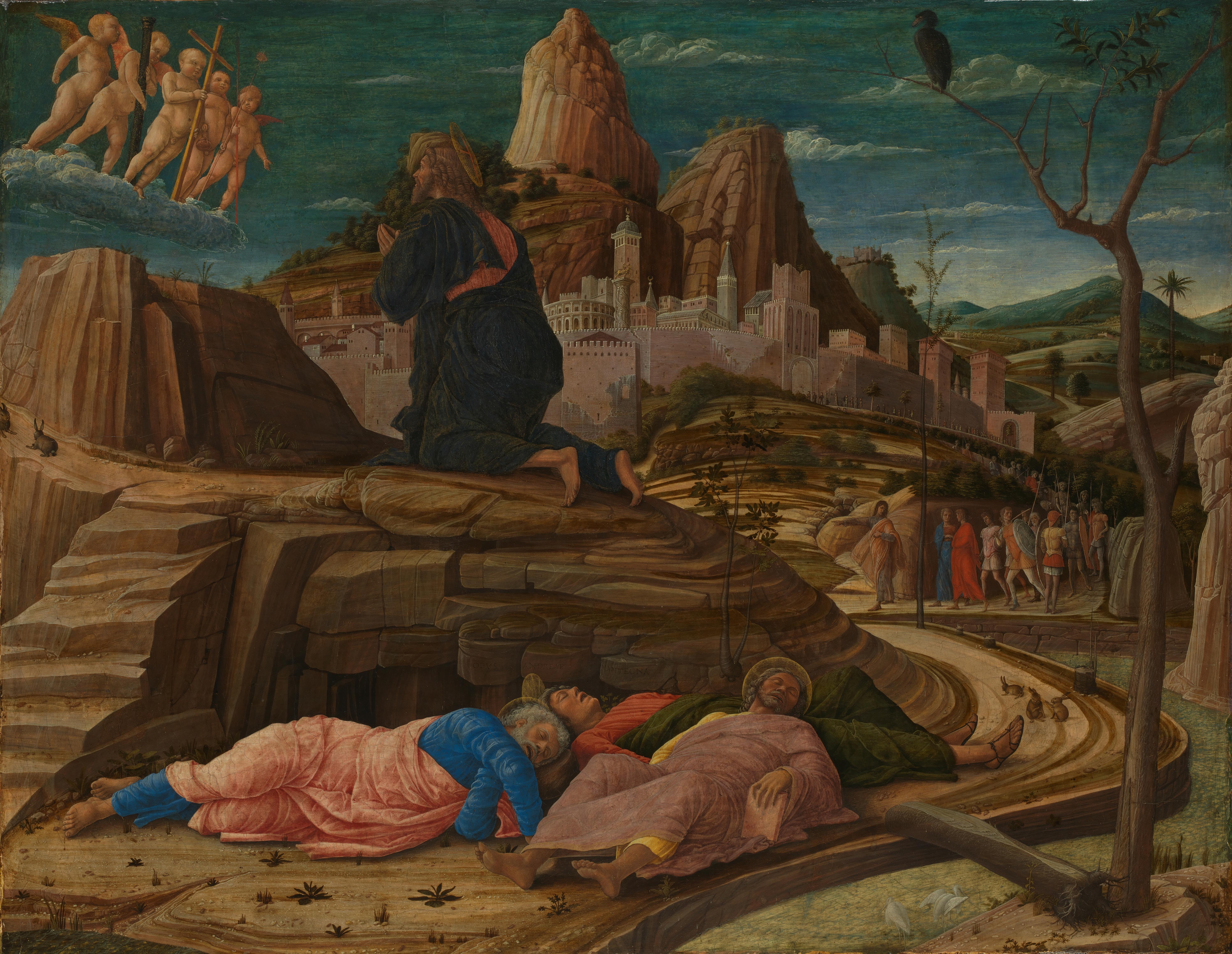
The Agony in the Garden (1459) National Gallery, London, is the pinnacle of Mantegna's early style

Mantegna was born in Isola di Carturo, close to Padua, in the Venetian Republic. He was the second son of a carpenter, Biagio. At the age of 11, he became apprenticed to Paduan painter Francesco Squarcione. Squarcione, whose original profession was tailoring, appears to have had a remarkable enthusiasm for ancient art, and a faculty for acting. Like his famous compatriot Petrarca, Squarcione was an ancient Rome enthusiast: he traveled in Italy, and perhaps also in Greece, collecting antique statues, reliefs, vases, etc., making his own drawings from them, then making available his collection for others to study. All the while, he continued undertaking works on commission, to which his pupils, no less than he, contributed.

As many as 137 painters and pictorial students passed through Squarcione's school, which had been established around 1440 and which became famous all over Italy. Padua attracted artists not only from the Veneto, but also from Tuscany, such as Paolo Uccello, Filippo Lippi, and Donatello. Mantegna's early career was shaped by impressions of Florentine works. At the time, Mantegna was said to be a favorite pupil of Squarcione, who taught him Latin and instructed him to study fragments of Roman sculpture. The master also preferred forced perspective, recollection of which may account for some of Mantegna's later innovations. However, at the age of 17, Mantegna left Squarcione's workshop. He later claimed that Squarcione had profited from his work without sufficient payment.

Mantegna's first work, now lost, was an altarpiece for the church of Santa Sofia in 1448. The same year he was called, together with Nicolò Pizolo, to work with a large group of painters entrusted with the decoration of the Ovetari Chapel in the transept of the Sant'Agostino degli Eremitani. It is probable, however, that before this time some of the pupils of Squarcione, including Mantegna, had already begun the series of frescoes in the chapel of S. Cristoforo, in the church of the Eremitani, which are today considered a masterpiece. After a series of coincidences, Mantegna finished most of the work alone, although Ansuino, who collaborated with Mantegna in the Ovetari Chapel, brought his style from the Forlì school of painting. The now critical Squarcione carped about the earlier works of this series, illustrating the life of St. James; he said the figures were like men made of stone, and should have been painted stone color.

This series was almost entirely lost in the 1944 Allied bombings of Padua. The most dramatic work of the fresco cycle was the work set in the worm's-eye view perspective, St. James Led to His Execution. Although much less dramatic in its perspective than the St. James painting, the San Zeno altarpiece was executed around 1455 not long after the St. James cycle was finished, and uses many of the same techniques, including an architectural structure based on Classical antiquity.

The sketch for the St. Stephen fresco has survived and is the earliest known preliminary sketch that still survives to compare with the corresponding fresco. The drawing shows proof that nude figures—which were later painted as clothed—were used in the conception of works during the Early Renaissance. In the preliminary sketch, the perspective is less developed and closer to a more average viewpoint however. Despite the authentic Classical look of the monument, it is not a copy of any known Roman structure. Mantegna also adopted the wet drapery patterns of the Romans, who took the form from the Greek invention, for the clothing of his figures, although the tense figures and interactions are derived from Donatello.

Among the other early Mantegna frescoes are the two saints above the entrance porch of the church of Sant'Antonio in Padua, 1452, and the 1453 San Luca Altarpiece, with St. Luke and other saints, for the church of S. Giustina and now in the Brera Gallery in Milan. As the young artist progressed in his work, he came under the influence of Jacopo Bellini, father of the celebrated painters Giovanni and Gentile, as well as where Mantegna met Bellini's daughter Nicolosia. In 1453, Jacopo consented to a marriage between Nicolosia and Mantegna.

=== Aesthetic ===
Mantegna was criticized for creating body forms that were too statuesque. His art, however, differentiates between ancient classical aesthetics in nude forms and purposeful depictions of sculptural illusion. The age-old criticism stems from Mantegna's master teacher Francesco Squarcione of Padua, described in Giorgio Vasari's The Lives of the Most Excellent Painters, Sculptors, and Architects. Pertaining to the Ovetari Chapel frescoes in the Church of Eremitani, Vasari writes that Squarcione stingingly remarked that "Andrea would have done much better with those figures if he had given them the tint of marble and not all those colours; they would have been nearer to perfection since they had no resemblance to life." This is ironic since, according to Vasari, it was Squarcione's love of ancient Roman art that influenced Mantegna. Mantegna is believed to have studied reproduced castings of these sculptures at Squarcione's studio. He was also influenced by the work of Donatello as well as models he sculpted to capture anatomy. Later in life, he was in Rome from 1488 to 1490 where he also studied sculptural masterpieces.

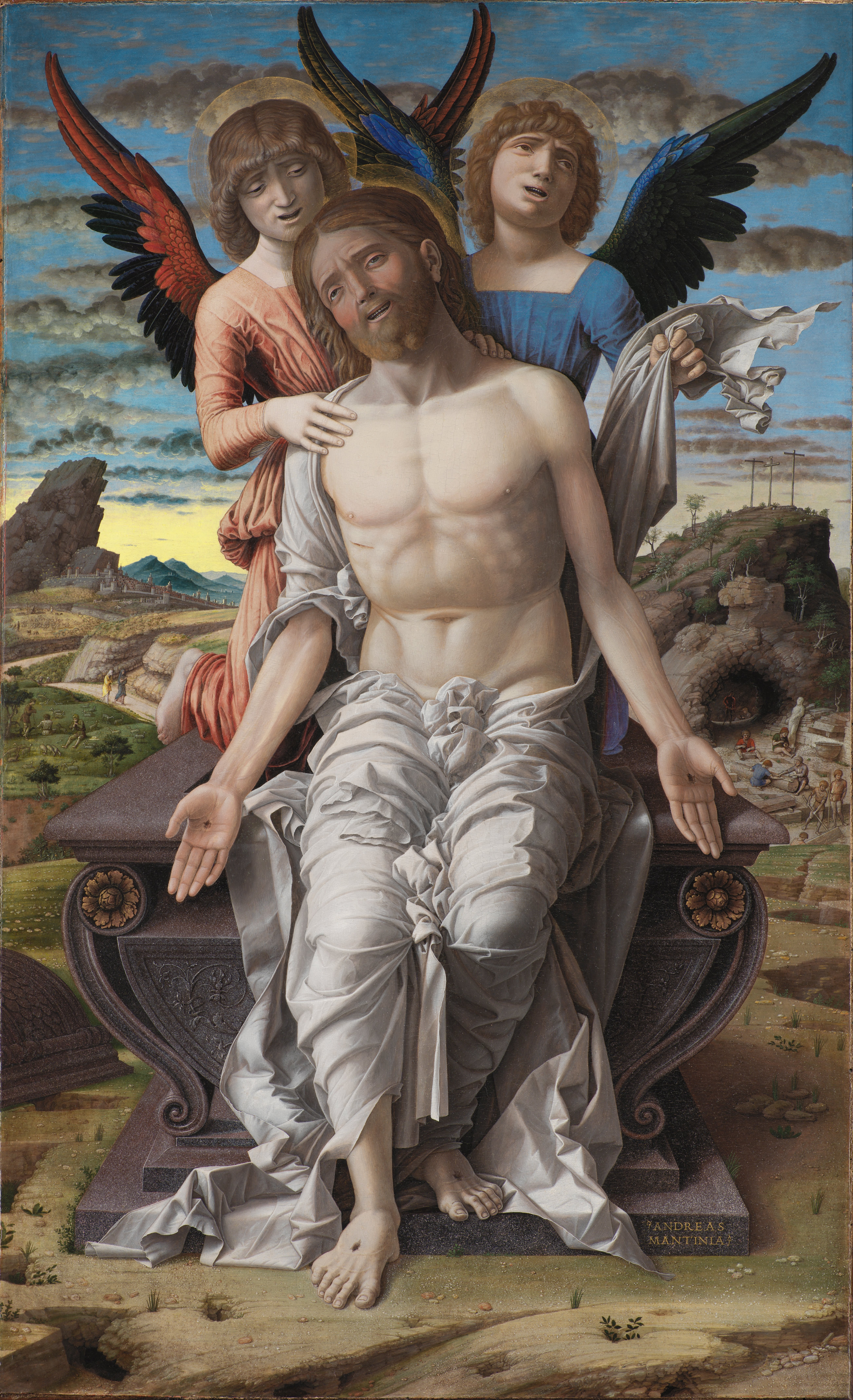
Christ as the Suffering Redeemer. Christ resurrecting, depicted according to Luke 24:1–2, praising the Lord with a hymn (c. 1488–1500)

Andrea seems to have been influenced by his old preceptor's strictures, although his later subjects, for example, those from the legend of St. Christopher, combine his sculptural style with a greater sense of naturalism and vivacity. Trained as he had been in the study of marbles and the severity of the antique, Mantegna openly avowed that he considered ancient art superior to nature as being more eclectic in form. As a result, the painter exercised precision in outline, privileging the figure. Overall, Mantegna's work thus tended toward rigidity, demonstrating an austere wholeness rather than graceful sensitivity of expression. His draperies are tight and closely folded, being studied (it is said) from models draped in paper and woven fabrics gummed in place. His figures are slim, muscular, and bony; the action impetuous, but of arrested energy. Finally, tawny landscape, gritty with littering pebbles, marks the athletic hauteur of his style.

Mantegna never changed the manner that he had adopted in Padua, although his coloring—at first neutral and undecided—strengthened and matured. Throughout his works there is more balancing of color than fineness of tone. One of his great aims was optical illusion, carried out by a mastery of perspective which, although not always mathematically correct, attained an astonishing effect for the times.

Successful and admired while he was there, Mantegna left his native Padua at an early age, and never returned there; the hostility of Squarcione has been cited as the cause. He spent the rest of his life in Verona, Mantua, and Rome; belief that he also stayed in Venice and Florence has not been confirmed. In Verona between 1457 and 1459, he painted a grand altarpiece for the church of San Zeno Maggiore, depicting a Madonna and angels, with four saints on each side on the San Zeno Altarpiece, central panel, San Zeno, Verona. It was probably the first good example of Renaissance art in Verona, and inspired a similar painting by the Veronese artist Girolamo dai Libri.

=== Work in Mantua ===
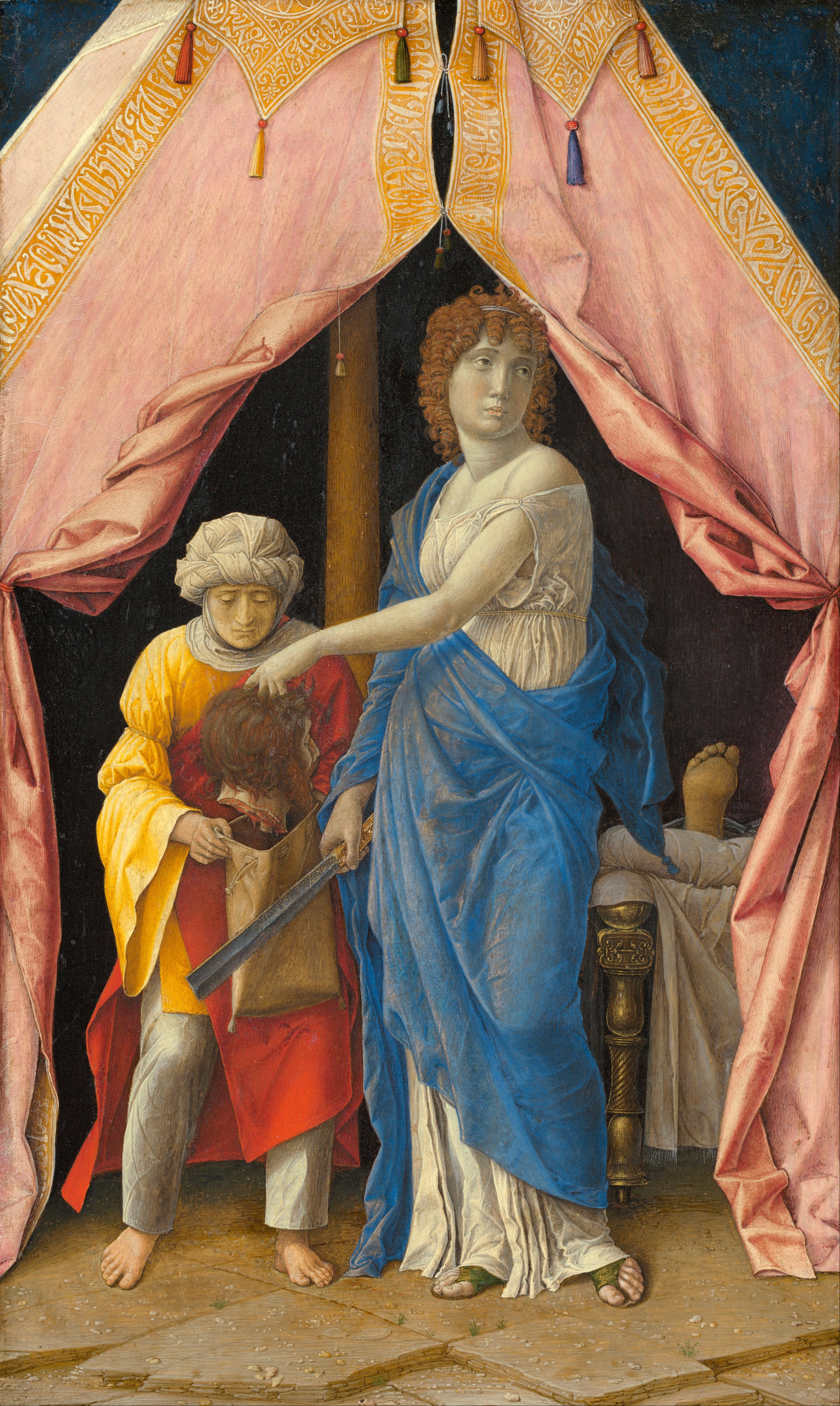
Judith and Holofernes, by Andrea Mantegna or possibly Giulio Campagnola, c. 1495

The Marquis Ludovico III Gonzaga of Mantua had for some time been pressing Mantegna to enter his service; and the following year, 1460, Mantegna was appointed court artist. He resided at first from time to time at Goito, but, from December 1466 onward, he moved with his family to Mantua. His engagement was for a salary of 75 lire a month, a sum so large for that period as to mark conspicuously the high regard in which his art was held. In fact, he was the first painter of any eminence to be based in Mantua.

His Mantuan masterpiece was painted for the court of Mantua, in the apartment of the Castle of the city, today known as Camera degli Sposi (literally, "Wedding Chamber") of Palazzo Ducale, Mantua: a series of full compositions in fresco including various portraits of the Gonzaga family and some figures of genii and others. The innovative spatial construction of the frescoes, particularly the oculus in the ceiling, had a profound effect on Antonio da Correggio.

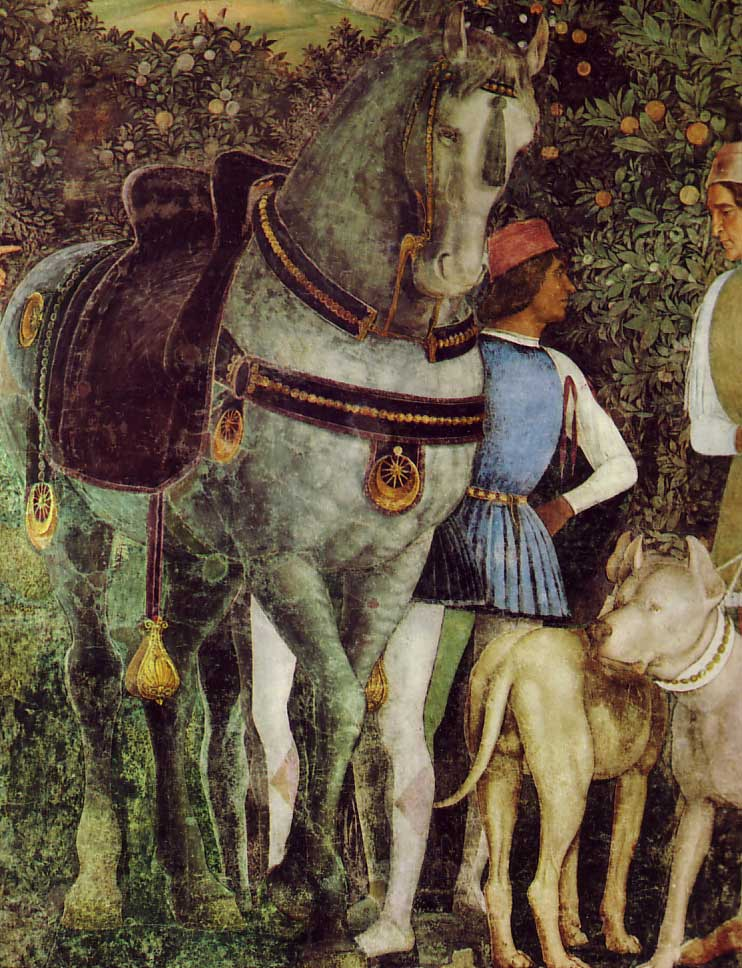
Detail of Camera degli Sposi

The decoration of the Chamber was finished presumably in 1474. The ten years that followed were not happy ones for Mantegna and Mantua: Mantegna grew irritable, his son Bernardino died, as well as the Marchese Ludovico, his wife Barbara, and his successor Federico (who had dubbed Mantegna cavaliere, "knight"). Only with the election of Francesco II of the House of Gonzaga did artistic commissions in Mantua recommence. He built a stately house in the area of the church of San Sebastiano, and adorned it with a multitude of paintings. The house can still be seen today, although the paintings no longer survive. In this period he began to collect some ancient Roman busts (that were given to Lorenzo de' Medici when the Florentine leader visited Mantua in 1483), painted some architectonic and decorative fragments, and finished the intense St. Sebastian now in the Louvre (box at top).

In 1488, Mantegna was called by Pope Innocent VIII to paint frescoes in a chapel Belvedere in the Vatican. This series of frescoes, including a noted Baptism of Christ, was later destroyed by Pius VI in 1780. The pope treated Mantegna with less liberality than he had been used to at the Mantuan court; but all things considered, their connection, which ceased in 1500, was not unsatisfactory to either party. Mantegna also met the famous Turkish hostage Jem and carefully studied Rome's ancient monuments, but his impression of the city was a disappointing one overall. Returned to Mantua in 1490, he embraced again his more literary and bitter vision of antiquity, and entered in strong connection with the new Marchesa, the cultured and intelligent Isabella d'Este. However, Isabella was not pleased with his attempt of a portrait of her in 1493. She said that "the painter did it so badly that it has no features like our own".

In what was now his city, he went on with the nine tempera pictures of the Triumphs of Caesar, which he had probably begun before his leaving for Rome, and which he finished around 1492. These superbly designed compositions are filled with the classical learning and enthusiasm of one of the masters of the age. Considered Mantegna's finest works, they were sold in 1628, along with the bulk of the Mantuan art treasures to King Charles I of England.

=== Later years ===
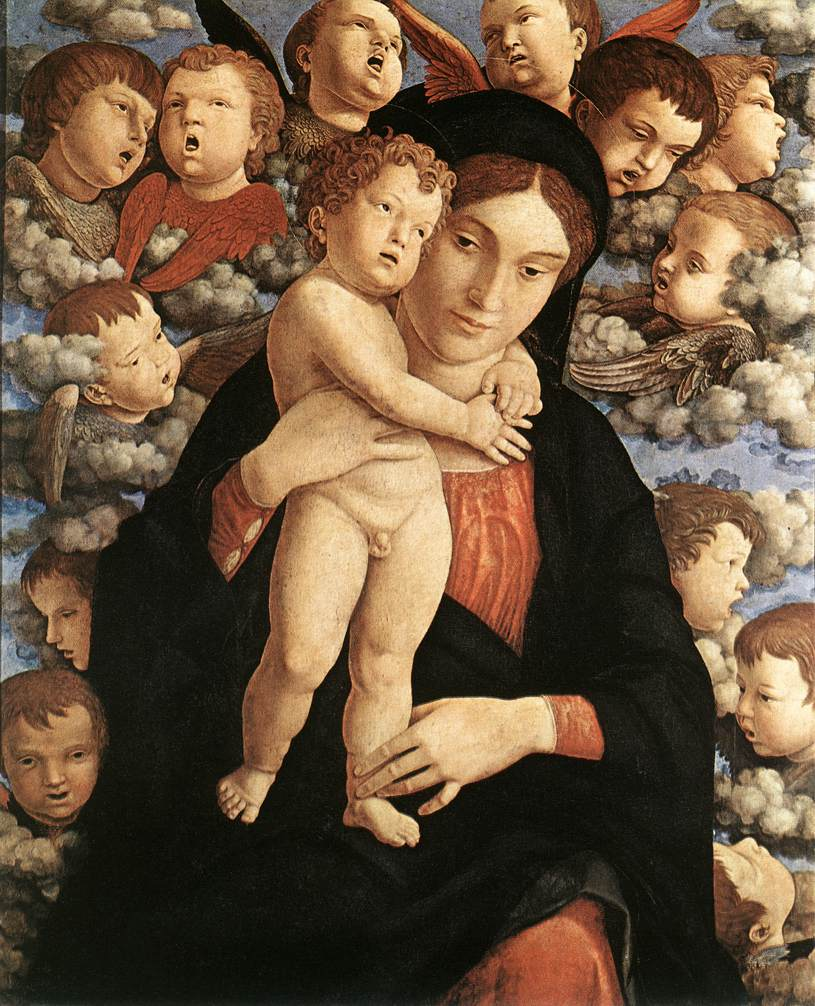
The Madonna of the Cherubim (1485)

Despite his declining health, Mantegna continued to paint. Other works of this period include the Madonna of the Caves, the St. Sebastian, and the famous Lamentation over the Dead Christ, probably painted for his personal funerary chapel. Another work of Mantegna's later years was what is known as the Madonna della Vittoria, now in the Louvre. It was painted in tempera about 1495, in commemoration of the Battle of Fornovo, whose questionable outcome Francesco Gonzaga was eager to show as an Italian League victory; the church that originally housed the painting was built from Mantegna's own design. The Madonna is here depicted with various saints, the archangel Michael, and St. Maurice holding her mantle, which is extended over the kneeling Francesco Gonzaga, amid a profusion of rich festooning and other accessories. Although not in all respects of his highest order of execution, this counts among the most obviously beautiful of Mantegna's works in which the qualities of beauty and attractiveness are less marked than those other excellences more germane to his severe genius, tense energy passing into haggard passion.

After 1497, Mantegna was commissioned by Isabella d'Este to translate the mythological themes written by the court poet Paride Ceresara into paintings for her private apartment (studiolo) in the Palazzo Ducale. These paintings were dispersed in the following years: one of them, the legend of the God Comus, was left unfinished by Mantegna and completed by his successor as court painter in Mantua, Lorenzo Costa. The other painters commissioned by Isabella for her studiolo were Perugino and Correggio.

After the death of his wife and at an advanced age Mantegna became the father of an illegitimate son, Giovanni Andrea; and, finally, although he continued embarking on various expenses and schemes, he had serious tribulations, such as the banishment from Mantua of his son Francesco, who had incurred the displeasure of the Marchese. The difficult situation of the aged master and connoisseur required the hard necessity of parting with a beloved antique bust of Faustina.

Very soon after this transaction, he died in Mantua, on September 13, 1506. In 1516, a handsome monument was set up to him by his sons in the church of Sant'Andrea, where he had painted the altarpiece of the mortuary chapel. The dome is decorated by Correggio.

== Engravings ==
Mantegna was no less eminent as an engraver, although his history in that respect is somewhat obscure, partly because he never signed or dated any of his plates, except for a single disputed instance of 1472. The account that has come down to us from Vasari (who was, as usual, keen to assert that everything flows from Florence) is that Mantegna began engraving in Rome, prompted by the engravings produced by the Florentine Baccio Baldini after Sandro Botticelli. This is now considered most unlikely as it would consign all the numerous and elaborate engravings made by Mantegna to the last sixteen or seventeen years of his life, which seems a brief period for them. Besides, the earlier engravings reflect an earlier period of his artistic style. It is possible that Mantegna may have begun engraving while still in Padua, under the tuition of a distinguished goldsmith, Niccolò. He and his workshop engraved approximately thirty plates, according to the usual reckoning; large, full of figures, and highly studied. It is now considered that either he only engraved seven, or none. Another artist from the workshop who made several plates is usually identified as Giovanni Antonio da Brescia (aka Zoan Andrea).

Among the principal examples are: Battle of the Sea Monsters, Virgin and Child, a Bacchanal Festival, Hercules and Antaeus, Marine Gods, Judith with the Head of Holofernes, the Deposition from the Cross, the Entombment, the Resurrection, the Man of Sorrows, the Virgin in a Grotto, and several scenes from the Triumph of Julius Caesar after his paintings. Several of his engravings are supposed to be executed on some metal less hard than copper. The technique he and his followers used is characterized by the strongly marked forms of the design, and by the parallel hatching used to produce shadows. The closer the parallel marks, the darker the shadows were. The prints are frequently to be found in two states, or editions. In the first, the prints have been produced using a roller, or even, by hand pressing, and they are weak in tint; in the second, a printing press has been used, and the ink is stronger.

Neither Mantegna or his workshop are now believed to have produced the so-called Mantegna Tarocchi cards.

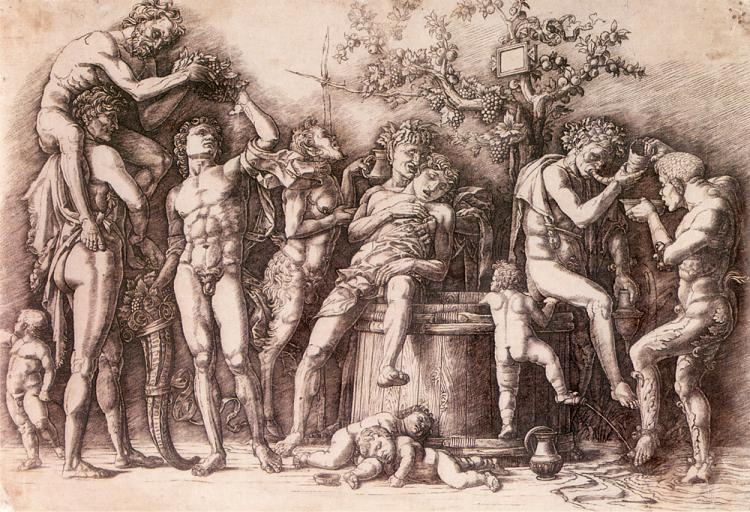
Bacchanal with a wine vat engraving
by Andrea Mantegna, c. 1475,
278 × 422 mm

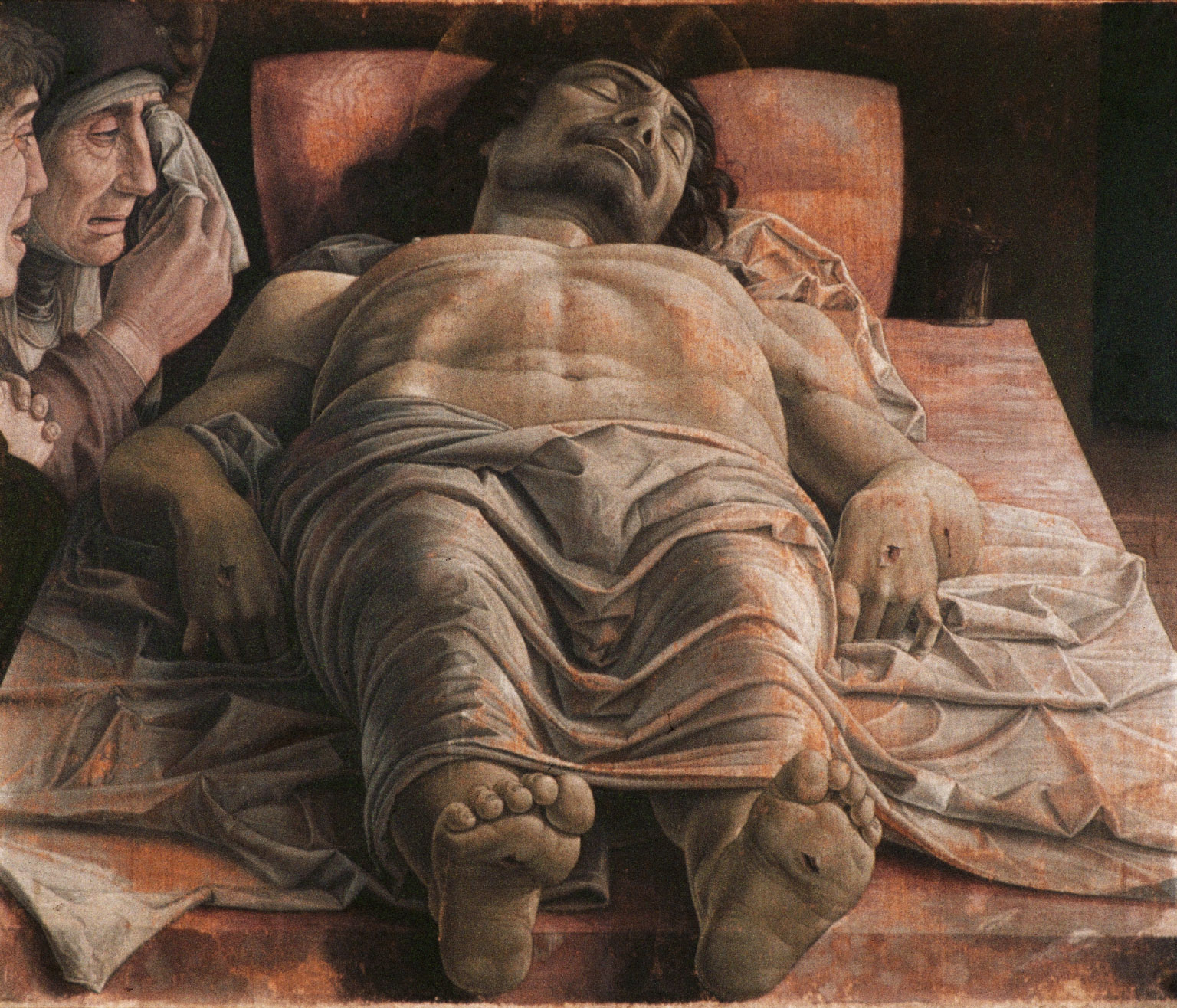
The Lamentation over the Dead Christ by Andrea Mantegna
Tempera on canvas, 68×81 cm, 1490; Pinacoteca di Brera, Milan

== Assessment and legacy ==
Giorgio Vasari eulogizes Mantegna, although pointing out his litigious character. He had been fond of his fellow pupils in Padua: and with two of them, Dario da Trevigi and Marco Zoppo, he retained steady friendships. Mantegna became very extravagant in his habits, fell at times into financial difficulties, and had to press his valid claims for payment upon the attention of the Marchese.

In terms of Classical taste, Mantegna distanced all contemporary competition. Although substantially related to the fifteenth century, his influence on the style and trends of his age was very marked over Italian art generally. Giovanni Bellini, in his earlier works, obviously followed the lead of his brother-in-law Andrea. Albrecht Dürer was influenced by his style during his two trips in Italy, reproducing several of his engravings. Leonardo da Vinci took from Mantegna the use of decorations with festoons and fruit.

Mantegna's main legacy is considered the introduction of spatial illusionism, both in frescoes and in sacra conversazione paintings: his tradition of ceiling decoration was followed for almost three centuries. Starting from the faint cupola of the Camera degli Sposi, Correggio built on the research of his master and collaborator into perspective constructions, eventually producing a masterwork such as the dome of Cathedral of Parma.

== Major works ==
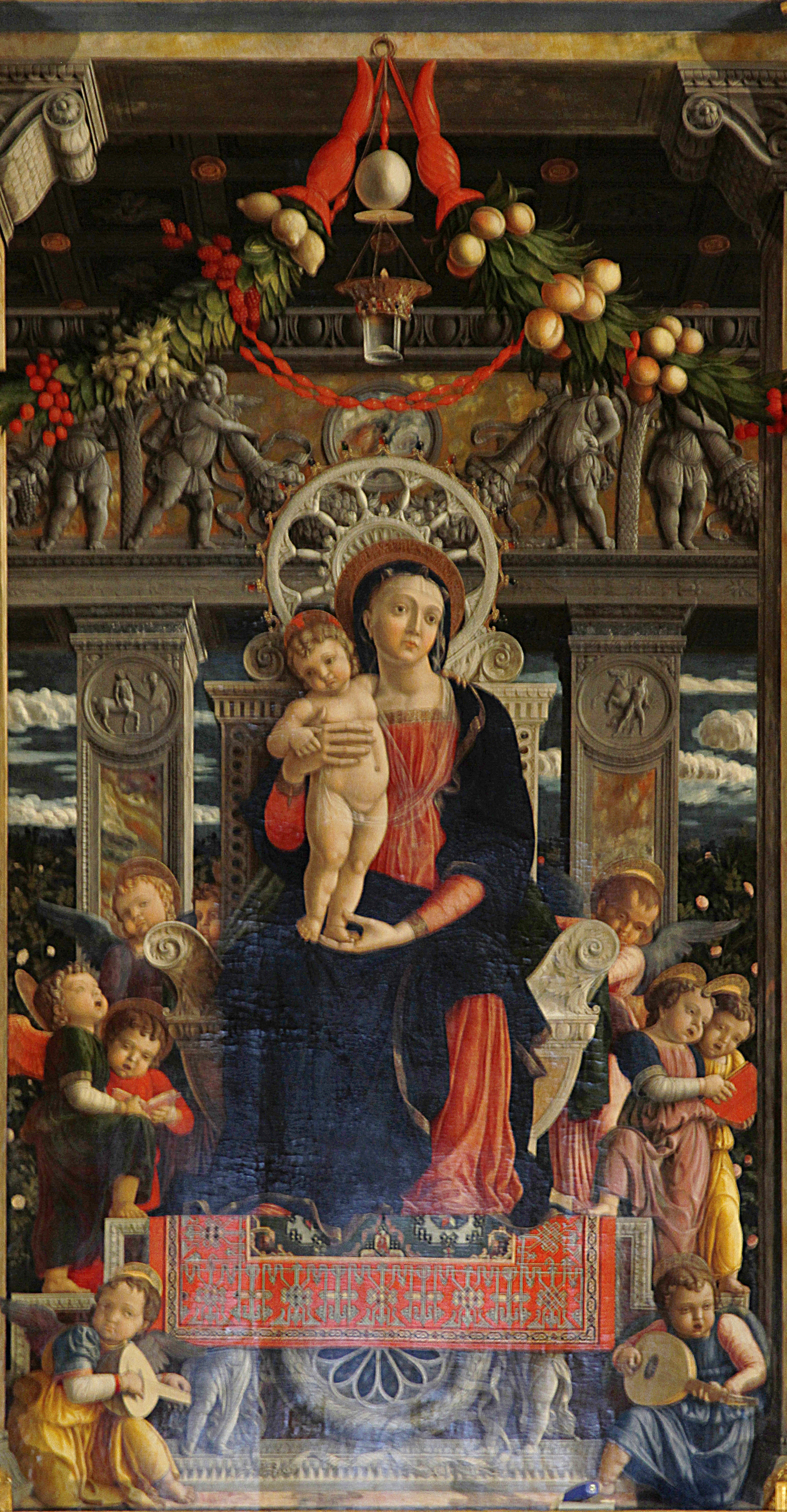
The Virgin Mary in Andrea Mantegna's San Zeno Altarpiece combines pseudo-Arabic halos and garment hems, with an Oriental carpet at her feet (1456–1459)

- St. Jerome in the Wilderness (c. 1448–1451) - Tempera on wood, 48 × 36 cm, São Paulo Museum of Art, São Paulo, Brazil
- The Adoration of the Shepherds (c. 1451–1453) - Tempera on canvas transferred from wood, 40 × 55,6 cm, Metropolitan Museum of Art, New York City
- San Luca Altarpiece (1453) - Panel, 177 × 230 cm, Pinacoteca di Brera, Milan
- St Euphemia (1454) - Glue on tempera on canvas, 171 × 78 cm, Museo nazionale di Capodimonte, Naples
- Presentation at the Temple (c. 1455) - Tempera on wood, 68.9 × 86.3 cm, Staatliche Museen, Berlin, Germany
- Madonna and Child with Saint Jerome and Saint Louis of Toulouse (c. 1455) - Tempera on panel, Musée Jacquemart-André, Paris
- Crucifixion (1457–1459) - Wood, 67 × 93 cm, Louvre, Paris
- Christ as the Suffering Redeemer (1495–1500) - Tempera on wood, 78 × 48 cm, Statens Museum for Kunst, Copenhagen, Denmark
- Agony in the Garden (c. 1459) - Tempera on wood, 63 × 80 cm, National Gallery, London
- Portrait of Cardinal Ludovico Trevisan, (c. 1459–1460) - Tempera on wood, 44 × 33 cm, Staatliche Museen, Berlin
- St. Bernardino of Siena between Two Angels, (attributed, 1460) - Tempera on canvas, 385 × 220 cm, Pinacoteca di Brera, Milan
- Portrait of a Man (c. 1460–1470) - Wood, 24.2 × 19 cm, National Gallery of Art, Washington, D.C., US
- Death of the Virgin (c. 1461) - Panel, 54 × 42 cm, Museo del Prado, Madrid
- Portrait of Francesco Gonzaga (c. 1461) - Panel, 25 × 18 cm, Capodimonte Museum, Naples
- Madonna with Sleeping Child (c. 1465–1470) - Distemper on canvas, 43x32 cm, Staatliche Museen, Berlin
- St. George (c. 1460) - Tempera on panel, 66 × 32 cm, Gallerie dell'Accademia, Venice
- San Zeno Altarpiece (1457–1460) - Panel, 480 × 450 cm, San Zeno, Verona
- St. Sebastian (c. 1457–1459) - Wood, 68 × 30 cm, Kunsthistorisches Museum, Vienna
- St. Sebastian - Panel, 255 × 140 cm, Louvre, Paris
- Adoration of the Magi (1462) - Tempera on panel, 76 × 76.5 cm, Uffizi, Florence
- The Ascension (1462) - Tempera on panel, 86 × 42.5 cm, Uffizi, Florence
- The Circumcision (1462–1464) - Tempera on panel, 86 × 42.5 cm, Uffizi, Florence
- Portrait of Carlo de' Medici (c. 1459–1466) - Tempera on panel, 40.6 × 29.5 cm, Uffizi, Florence
- The Madonna of the Cherubim (c. 1485) - Panel, 88 × 70 cm, Pinacoteca di Brera, Milan
- Triumphs of Caesar (c. 1486) - Hampton Court Palace, England
- The Lamentation over the Dead Christ (c. 1490) - Tempera on canvas, 68 × 81 cm, Pinacoteca di Brera, Milan
- Madonna of the Caves (1489–1490) - Uffizi, Florence
- St. Sebastian (1490) - Panel, 68 × 30 cm, Ca' d'Oro, Venice
- Madonna della Vittoria (1495) - Tempera on canvas, 285 × 168 cm, Louvre, Paris
- Ecce homo (1500)- Tempera on canvas, 54 × 72 cm, Musée Jacquemart-André, Paris
- Holy Family (c. 1495–1500) - Tempera on canvas, 75.5 × 61.5 cm, The Dresden Gallery, Dresden
- Judith and Holofernes (1495) - Egg-tempera on wood, National Gallery of Art, Washington, D.C.
- Trivulzio Madonna (1497) - Tempera on canvas, 287 × 214 cm, Museo Civico d'Arte Antica, Milan
- Parnassus (Mars and Venus) (1497) - Canvas, 160 × 192 cm, Louvre, Paris
- Minerva Chases the Vices from the Garden of Virtue (c. 1502) Oil on canvas, 160 × 192 cm, Louvre, Paris

Mantegna's only known sculpture is a Sant'Eufemia in the Cathedral of Irsina, Basilicata.
