= Saint Jerome in the Wilderness (Mantegna) =

Painting by Andrea Mantegna

- Saint Jerome Penitent in the Desert
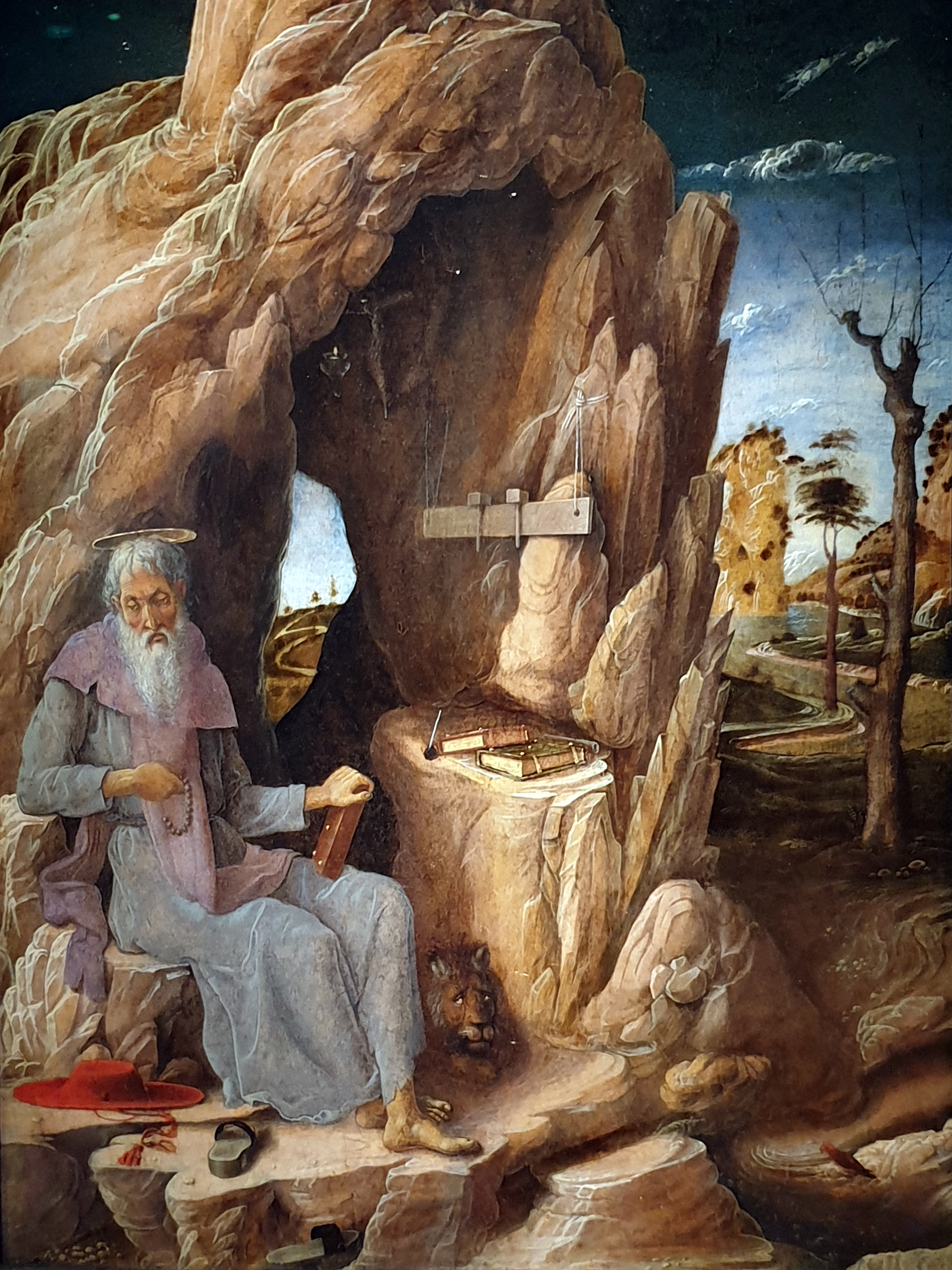
- Year: c. 1448–1451
- Medium: tempera on panel
- Dimensions: 51 cm × 40 cm (20 in × 16 in)
- Location: São Paulo Museum of Art, São Paulo
- Accession: MASP.00015

Saint Jerome in the Wilderness (also Saint Jerome Penitent in the Desert) is a painting in tempera on panel, measuring 51 by 40 cm and attributed to Andrea Mantegna. It dates to between 1448 and 1451 and is now in the São Paulo Museum of Art.

== History ==
It is usually thought of as an early work by the artist, executed shortly after he left the studio of Francesco Squarcione in 1448, enabling him to shift from religious works for third parties to private commissions in a variety of genres, such as this one, thought to have been commissioned by the humanist and poet Ulisse degli Aleotti. It probably also relates to his first trip to Ferrara in 1449 to work at the court of Leonello d'Este. The Kupferstichkabinett in Berlin holds a drawing of Saint Jerome with a lion, dating to around the same time, with a depiction of the saint that has many similarities to that of the painting, but in a different pose – it may be a preparatory drawing for this composition or a study for another now-lost work.

The painting merges Jerome the scholar and Jerome the ascetic, the two predominant modes for depicting the saint. The abandoned sandal in the foreground has probably been borrowed from Flemish works, which Mantegna could have seen in the Este collections. Two hammers are resting on a beam hanging in the cave, possibly referring to Christ's Passion, whilst perched above the cave entrance is a barn owl, traditionally linked to magic and superstition, which Jerome and Ulisse fight with the light of reason.
