= Madonna of the Cherubim =

Painting by Andrea Mantegna

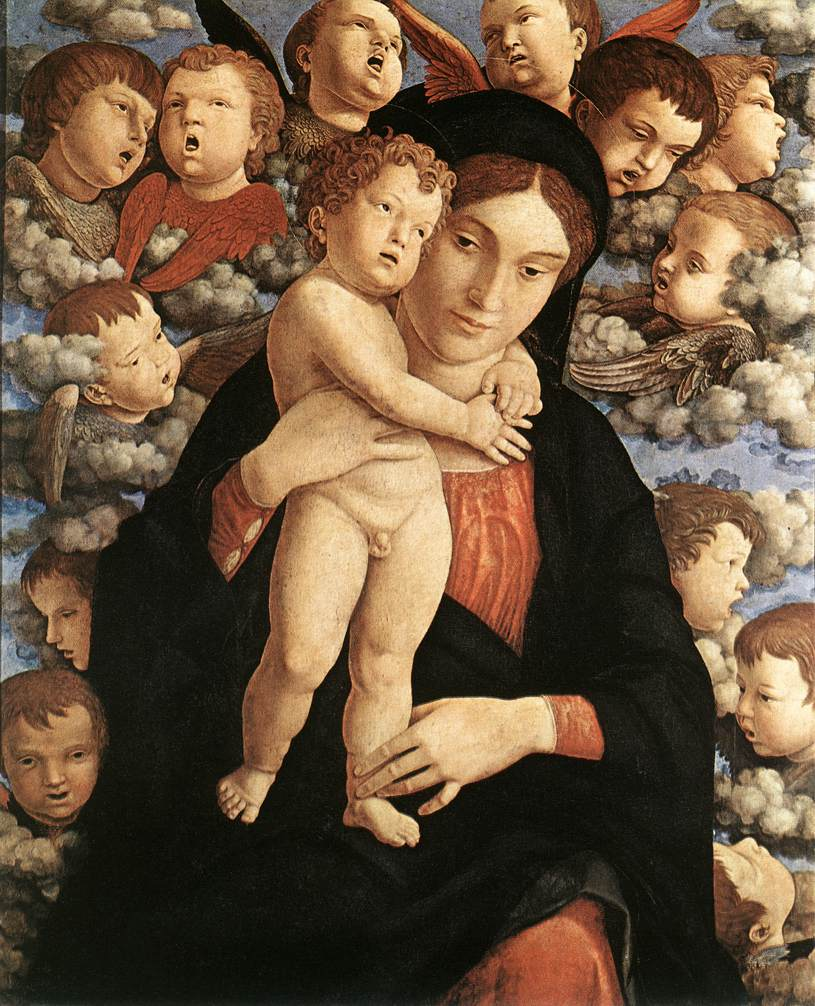
- Artist: Andrea Mantegna
- Year: c. 1485
- Type: Tempera on wood
- Dimensions: 88 cm × 70 cm (35 in × 28 in)
- Location: Pinacoteca di Brera

The Madonna of the Cherubim is a painting of c. 1485 by the Italian Renaissance painter Andrea Mantegna in the Pinacoteca di Brera, Milan.
