= San Luca Altarpiece =

1453 altarpiece by Andrea Mantegna

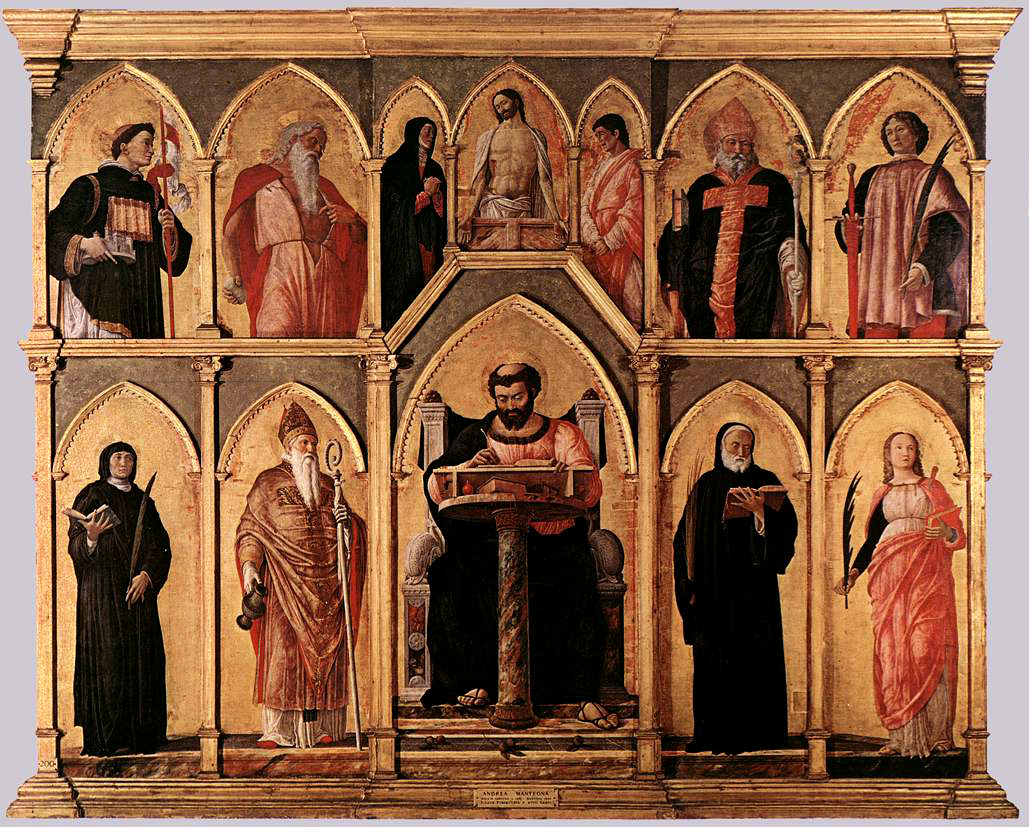
- Artist: Andrea Mantegna
- Year: 1453–1454
- Type: Panel
- Dimensions: 177 cm × 230 cm (70 in × 91 in)
- Location: Pinacoteca di Brera; Milan

The San Lucas Altarpiece, also known as the San Lucas Polyptych, is a 1453 polyptych panel painting by Northern Italian Renaissance painter Andrea Mantegna. The altarpiece is a polyptych panel painting featuring 12 figures each in their own arch. The six figures in the top row flank the central figure of Jesus Christ. The four beneath flank Saint Luke.

== History ==
On August 10, 1453, Mantegna signed a contract to paint the work for the monastery of Santa Giustina in Padua. In return for 50 ducats, Mantegna agreed to complete the work, providing paints with which to depict the figures and the azzurro Todesco (a blue pigment derived from copper) with which to inlay them. The work was completed within that or the following year. The polyptych is located in Pinacoteca di Brera, Milan.
