= Saint Euphemia (Mantegna) =

Painting by Andrea Mantegna

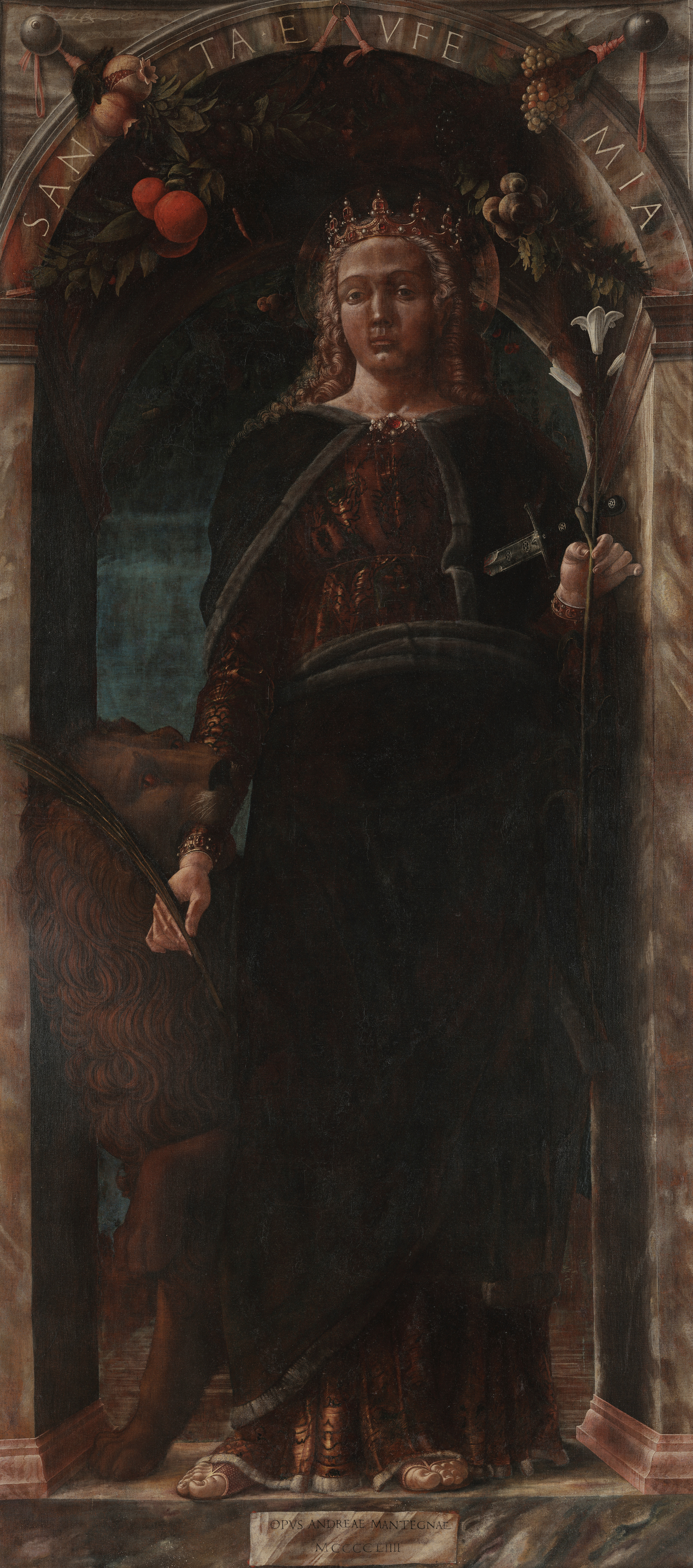
- Artist: Andrea Mantegna
- Year: 1454
- Medium: glue tempera on canvas
- Dimensions: 171 cm × 78 cm (67 in × 31 in)
- Location: Museo nazionale di Capodimonte, Naples

Saint Euphemia is a glue on tempera painting of Saint Euphemia by Andrea Mantegna, now in the Museo nazionale di Capodimonte in Naples. It is signed and dated 1454 on a small cartouche at the bottom, inscribed OPVS ANDREAE MANTEGNAE / MCCCCLIIII.

== Bibliography ==
- (in Italian) Tatjana Pauli, Mantegna, serie Art Book, Leonardo Arte, Milano 2001. ISBN 9788883101878
