= Madonna of the Caves =

Painting by Andrea Mantegna, 1488–1490

Madonna of the Quarry
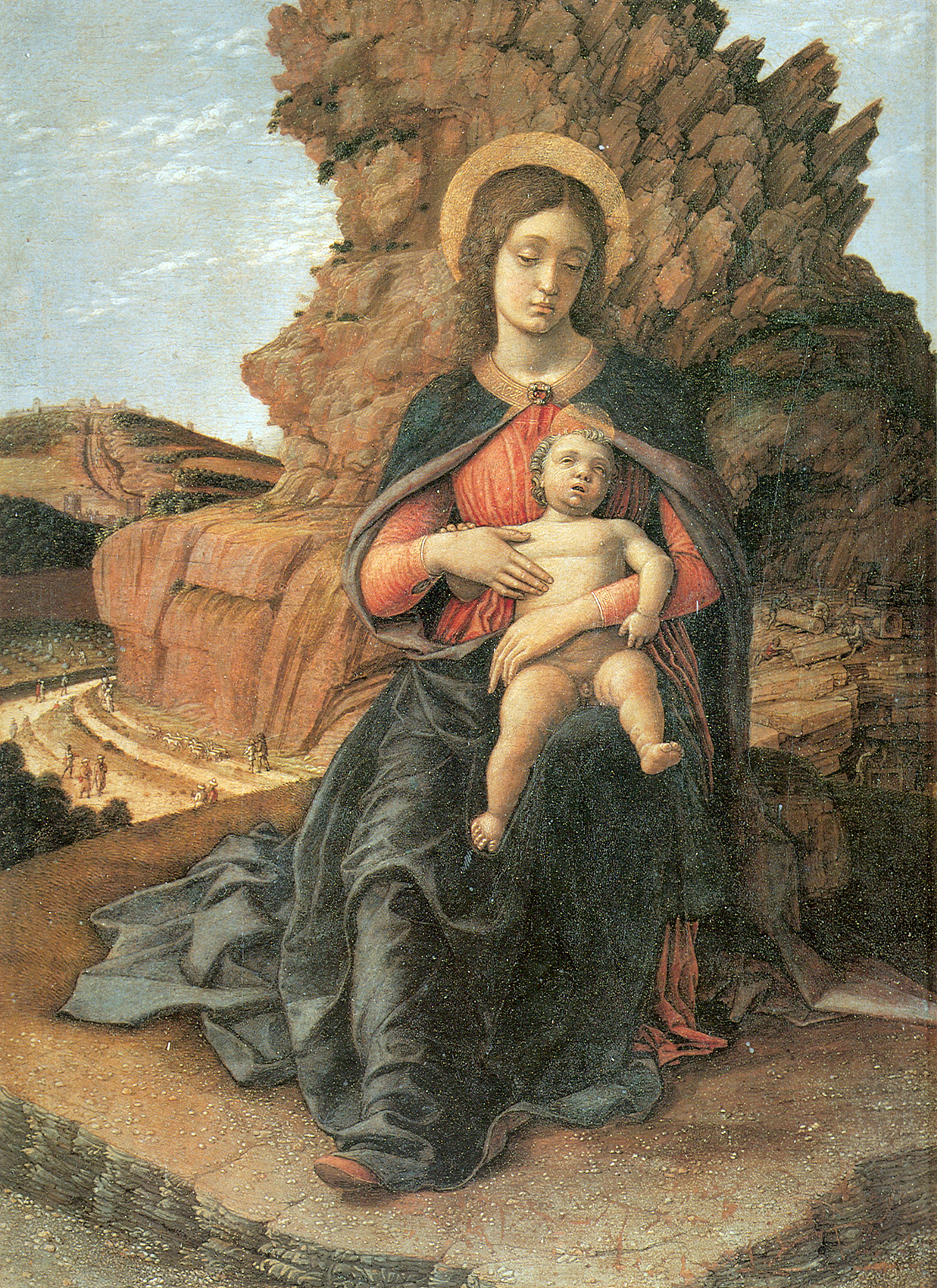
- Artist: Andrea Mantegna
- Year: 1488–1490
- Medium: tempera on panel
- Dimensions: 32 cm × 29.6 cm (13 in × 11.7 in)
- Location: Uffizi Gallery, Florence

The Madonna of the Caves (Italian – Madonna delle Cave) is a tempera on panel painting measuring 32 cm 29.6 cm. It was painted in 1488-1490 by the Italian painter Andrea Mantegna and is now in the Uffizi Gallery in Florence.

It is named after a stone quarry in the right-hand background, where workers are carving out a capital, a slab, part of a column shaft and a sarcophagus, perhaps alluding to Christ future flagellation and burial. The rock on which the Virgin sits may also be intended to represent the summit of Calvary, whilst in the left-hand background are a shepherd and his flock, farmers gathering hay from a field, a castle and a road leading to a distant walled city. Fiocco argues that the background is based on Carrara whilst Kristeller instead identifies it with Monte Bolca between Vicenza and Verona. Some interpret the shift from dark to light moving from right to left across the background as an allegory of redemption through Christ and the Church, with Mary as the mother of both.

== Dating ==
Its dating to 1488–1490 is based on Giorgio Vasari's description of Francesco I de' Medici's collections, which attributes it to Mantegna's time in Rome. Some have linked it to a work commissioned from Mantegna by Lorenzo de' Medici and mentioned in a letter from Lorenzo. Other historians date it differently due to its style and figuration. However, Mantegna's re-use of certain themes like rocky backgrounds throughout his career makes it difficult to date uncertain works definitively.

== Bibliography ==
- (in Italian) Tatjana Pauli, Mantegna, serie Art Book, Leonardo Arte, Milano 2001. ISBN 9788883101878
- (in Italian) Alberta De Nicolò Salmazo, Mantegna, Electa, Milano 1997.
- (in Italian) Ettore Camesasca, Mantegna, in AA.VV., Pittori del Rinascimento, Scala, Firenze 2007. ISBN 888117099X
- (in Italian) Gloria Fossi, Uffizi, Giunti, Firenze 2004. ISBN 88-09-03675-1
