= List of FEMA disaster and other emergency declarations =

This is a list of United States federal disaster/emergency eeclarations, managed by the Federal Emergency Management Agency.

This list does not differentiate between states, territories and tribal nations.

== Emergency declarations ==
=== 2015 - 2030 ===
State	Name	FEMA disaster code	Year declared	Disaster type	Notes
AR	SEVERE STORMS, TORNADOES, AND FLOODING	EM-3627-AR	2025	Tornado	
KY	SEVERE STORMS, STRAIGHT-LINE WINDS, TORNADOES, AND FLOODING	EM-3626-KY	2025	Severe Storm	
TN	SEVERE STORMS, STRAIGHT-LINE WINDS, TORNADOES, AND FLOODING	EM-3625-TN	2025	Severe Storm	
KY	SEVERE STORMS, STRAIGHT-LINE WINDS, FLOODING, AND LANDSLIDES	EM-3624-KY	2025	Landslide	
FL	Hurricane Milton	EM-3622-FL	2024	Hurricane	
FL	HURRICANE MILTON	EM-3623-FL	2024	Hurricane	
GU	TROPICAL STORM BOLAVEN	EM-3601-GU	2024	Tropical Storm	
MP	TROPICAL STORM BOLAVEN	EM-3602-MP	2024	Tropical Storm	
VI	ELEVATED LEVELS OF LEAD AND COPPER IN THE WATER SUPPLY	EM-3603-VI	2024	Other	
CT	SEVERE STORMS, FLOODING, AND A POTENTIAL DAM BREACH	EM-3604-CT	2024	Severe Storm	
FL	Tropical Storm Debby	EM-3605-FL	2024	Tropical Storm	
SC	HURRICANE DEBBY	EM-3606-SC	2024	Tropical Storm	
GA	HURRICANE DEBBY	EM-3607-GA	2024	Tropical Storm	
NC	TROPICAL STORM DEBBY	EM-3608-NC	2024	Tropical Storm	
VT	TROPICAL DEPRESSION DEBBY	EM-3609-VT	2024	Tropical Storm	
PR	Tropical Storm Ernesto	EM-3610-PR	2024	Severe Storm	
VI	TROPICAL STORM ERNESTO	EM-3611-VI	2024	Tropical Storm	
CT	SEVERE STORMS, FLOODING, LANDSLIDES, AND MUDSLIDES	EM-3612-CT	2024	Severe Storm	
NY	SEVERE STORM AND FLOODING	EM-3613-NY	2024	Severe Storm	
LA	TROPICAL STORM FRANCINE	EM-3614-LA	2024	Hurricane	
FL	Tropical Storm Helene	EM-3615-FL	2024	Tropical Storm	
GA	HURRICANE HELENE	EM-3616-GA	2024	Tropical Storm	
NC	HURRICANE HELENE	EM-3617-NC	2024	Tropical Storm	
AL	HURRICANE HELENE	EM-3618-AL	2024	Hurricane	
SC	HURRICANE HELENE	EM-3619-SC	2024	Tropical Storm	
TN	TROPICAL STORM HELENE	EM-3620-TN	2024	Tropical Storm	
VA	POST-TROPICAL CYCLONE HELENE	EM-3621-VA	2024	Tropical Storm	
NC	Hurricane Ian	EM-3586-NC	2023	Hurricane	
FL	TROPICAL STORM NICOLE	EM-3587-FL	2023	Tropical Storm	
FL	SEMINOLE TRIBE OF FLORIDA TROPICAL STORM NICOLE	EM-3588-FL	2023	Tropical Storm	
NY	SEVERE WINTER STORM AND SNOWSTORM	EM-3589-NY	2023	Winter Storm	
NY	SEVERE WINTER STORM	EM-3590-NY	2023	Winter Storm	
CA	SEVERE WINTER STORMS, FLOODING, AND MUDSLIDES	EM-3591-CA	2023	Flood	
CA	SEVERE WINTER STORMS, FLOODING, LANDSLIDES, AND MUDSLIDES	EM-3592-CA	2023	Flood	
MP	TYPHOON MAWAR	EM-3593-MP	2023	Tropical Storm	
GU	TYPHOON MAWAR	EM-3594-GU	2023	Tropical Storm	
VT	FLOODING	EM-3595-VT	2023	Flood	
FL	TROPICAL STORM IDALIA	EM-3596-FL	2023	Tropical Storm	
SC	HURRICANE IDALIA	EM-3597-SC	2023	Hurricane	
ME	HURRICANE LEE	EM-3598-ME	2023	Hurricane	
MA	HURRICANE LEE	EM-3599-MA	2023	Hurricane	
LA	SEAWATER INTRUSION	EM-3600-LA	2023	Other	
KY	SEVERE STORMS, STRAIGHT-LINE WINDS, FLOODING, AND TORNADOES	EM-3575-KY	2022	Tornado	
TN	SEVERE STORMS, STRAIGHT-LINE WINDS, AND TORNADOES	EM-3576-TN	2022	Tornado	
IL	SEVERE STORMS, STRAIGHT-LINE WINDS, AND TORNADOES	EM-3577-IL	2022	Tornado	
VI	WATER SHORTAGE AND HEALTH IMPACT FROM UNPRECEDENTED SARGASSUM SEAGRASS INFLUX	EM-3581-VI	2022	Other	
MS	WATER CRISIS	EM-3582-MS	2022	Other	
PR	TROPICAL STORM FIONA	EM-3583-PR	2022	Hurricane	
FL	TROPICAL STORM IAN	EM-3584-FL	2022	Hurricane	
SC	HURRICANE IAN	EM-3585-SC	2022	Hurricane	
LA	HURRICANE DELTA	EM-3547-LA	2021	Hurricane	
MS	HURRICANE DELTA	EM-3548-MS	2021	Hurricane	
LA	TROPICAL STORM ZETA	EM-3549-LA	2021	Hurricane	
MS	HURRICANE ZETA	EM-3550-MS	2021	Hurricane	
FL	HURRICANE ETA	EM-3551-FL	2021	Hurricane	
TN	EXPLOSION	EM-3552-TN	2021	Other	
DC	59TH PRESIDENTIAL INAUGURATION (Inauguration of Joe Biden)	EM-3553-DC	2021	Other	
TX	SEVERE WINTER STORM	EM-3554-TX	2021	Severe Ice Storm	
OK	SEVERE WINTER STORM	EM-3555-OK	2021	Severe Ice Storm	
LA	SEVERE WINTER STORM	EM-3556-LA	2021	Severe Ice Storm	
FL	SURFSIDE BUILDING COLLAPSE	EM-3560-FL	2021	Other	
FL	TROPICAL STORM ELSA	EM-3561-FL	2021	Severe Storm	
FL	TROPICAL STORM FRED	EM-3562-FL	2021	Hurricane	
RI	HURRICANE HENRI	EM-3563-RI	2021	Hurricane	
CT	HURRICANE HENRI	EM-3564-CT	2021	Hurricane	
NY	HURRICANE HENRI	EM-3565-NY	2021	Hurricane	
MA	TROPICAL STORM HENRI	EM-3566-MA	2021	Hurricane	
VT	TROPICAL STORM HENRI	EM-3567-VT	2021	Hurricane	
LA	TROPICAL STORM IDA	EM-3568-LA	2021	Hurricane	
MS	HURRICANE IDA	EM-3569-MS	2021	Hurricane	
CA	CALDOR FIRE	EM-3571-CA	2021	Fire	
NY	REMNANTS OF HURRICANE IDA	EM-3572-NY	2021	Hurricane	
NJ	REMNANTS OF HURRICANE IDA	EM-3573-NJ	2021	Hurricane	
LA	TROPICAL STORM NICHOLAS	EM-3574-LA	2021	Coastal Storm	
MP	TYPHOON HAGIBIS	EM-3424-MP	2020	Typhoon	
MP	TYPHOON BUALOI	EM-3425-MP	2020	Typhoon	
PR	EARTHQUAKES	EM-3426-PR	2020	Earthquake	
WA	COVID-19	EM-3427-WA	2020	Biological	
CA	COVID-19	EM-3428-CA	2020	Biological	
OR	COVID-19	EM-3429-OR	2020	Biological	
MD	COVID-19	EM-3430-MD	2020	Biological	
HI	COVID-19	EM-3431-HI	2020	Biological	
FL	COVID-19	EM-3432-FL	2020	Biological	
VI	COVID-19	EM-3433-VI	2020	Biological	
NY	COVID-19	EM-3434-NY	2020	Biological	
IL	COVID-19	EM-3435-IL	2020	Biological	
CO	COVID-19	EM-3436-CO	2020	Biological	
VT	COVID-19	EM-3437-VT	2020	Biological	
MA	COVID-19	EM-3438-MA	2020	Biological	
CT	COVID-19	EM-3439-CT	2020	Biological	
RI	COVID-19	EM-3440-RI	2020	Biological	
PA	COVID-19	EM-3441-PA	2020	Biological	
AZ	COVID-19	EM-3442-AZ	2020	Biological	
NV	COVID-19	EM-3443-NV	2020	Biological	
ME	COVID-19	EM-3444-ME	2020	Biological	
NH	COVID-19	EM-3445-NH	2020	Biological	
AK	COVID-19	EM-3446-AK	2020	Biological	
DC	COVID-19	EM-3447-DC	2020	Biological	
VA	COVID-19	EM-3448-VA	2020	Biological	
DE	COVID-19	EM-3449-DE	2020	Biological	
WV	COVID-19	EM-3450-WV	2020	Biological	
NJ	COVID-19	EM-3451-NJ	2020	Biological	
PR	COVID-19	EM-3452-PR	2020	Biological	
MN	COVID-19	EM-3453-MN	2020	Biological	
WI	COVID-19	EM-3454-WI	2020	Biological	
MI	COVID-19	EM-3455-MI	2020	Biological	
IN	COVID-19	EM-3456-IN	2020	Biological	
OH	COVID-19	EM-3457-OH	2020	Biological	
TX	COVID-19	EM-3458-TX	2020	Biological	
LA	COVID-19	EM-3459-LA	2020	Biological	
NM	COVID-19	EM-3460-NM	2020	Biological	
AR	COVID-19	EM-3461-AR	2020	Biological	
OK	COVID-19	EM-3462-OK	2020	Biological	
MP	COVID-19	EM-3463-MP	2020	Biological	
GA	COVID-19	EM-3464-GA	2020	Biological	
AS	COVID-19	EM-3465-AS	2020	Biological	
GU	COVID-19	EM-3466-GU	2020	Biological	
ID	COVID-19	EM-3467-ID	2020	Biological	
FL	COVID-19	EM-3468-FL	2020	Biological	
KY	COVID-19	EM-3469-KY	2020	Biological	
SC	COVID-19	EM-3470-SC	2020	Biological	
NC	COVID-19	EM-3471-NC	2020	Biological	
AL	COVID-19	EM-3472-AL	2020	Biological	
TN	COVID-19	EM-3473-TN	2020	Biological	
MS	COVID-19	EM-3474-MS	2020	Biological	
SD	COVID-19	EM-3475-SD	2020	Biological	
MT	COVID-19	EM-3476-MT	2020	Biological	
ND	COVID-19	EM-3477-ND	2020	Biological	
UT	COVID-19	EM-3478-UT	2020	Biological	
WY	COVID-19	EM-3479-WY	2020	Biological	
IA	COVID-19	EM-3480-IA	2020	Biological	
KS	COVID-19	EM-3481-KS	2020	Biological	
MO	COVID-19	EM-3482-MO	2020	Biological	
NE	COVID-19	EM-3483-NE	2020	Biological	
MA	COVID-19	EM-3484-MA	2020	Biological	
NM	COVID-19	EM-3485-NM	2020	Biological	
OK	COVID-19	EM-3486-OK	2020	Biological	
OK	COVID-19	EM-3487-OK	2020	Biological	
NE	COVID-19	EM-3488-NE	2020	Biological	
NE	COVID-19	EM-3489-NE	2020	Biological	
KS	COVID-19	EM-3490-KS	2020	Biological	
KS	COVID-19	EM-3491-KS	2020	Biological	
KS	COVID-19	EM-3492-KS	2020	Biological	
NE	COVID-19	EM-3493-NE	2020	Biological	
OK	COVID-19	EM-3494-OK	2020	Biological	
OK	COVID-19	EM-3495-OK	2020	Biological	
NM	COVID-19	EM-3496-NM	2020	Biological	
MA	COVID-19	EM-3497-MA	2020	Biological	
ME	COVID-19	EM-3498-ME	2020	Biological	
OK	COVID-19	EM-3499-OK	2020	Biological	
NM	COVID-19	EM-3500-NM	2020	Biological	
TX	COVID-19	EM-3501-TX	2020	Biological	
OK	COVID-19	EM-3502-OK	2020	Biological	
MN	COVID-19	EM-3503-MN	2020	Biological	
NY	COVID-19	EM-3504-NY	2020	Biological	
OK	COVID-19	EM-3505-OK	2020	Biological	
NM	COVID-19	EM-3506-NM	2020	Biological	
WA	COVID-19	EM-3507-WA	2020	Biological	
MN	COVID-19	EM-3508-MN	2020	Biological	
OK	COVID-19	EM-3509-OK	2020	Biological	
NM	COVID-19	EM-3510-NM	2020	Biological	
OK	COVID-19	EM-3511-OK	2020	Biological	
ND	COVID-19	EM-3512-ND	2020	Biological	
SD	COVID-19	EM-3513-SD	2020	Biological	
OK	COVID-19	EM-3514-OK	2020	Biological	
RI	COVID-19	EM-3515-RI	2020	Biological	
MT	COVID-19	EM-3516-MT	2020	Biological	
OK	COVID-19	EM-3517-OK	2020	Biological	
OK	COVID-19	EM-3518-OK	2020	Biological	
NM	COVID-19	EM-3519-NM	2020	Biological	
NM	COVID-19	EM-3520-NM	2020	Biological	
NM	COVID-19	EM-3521-NM	2020	Biological	
LA	COVID-19	EM-3522-LA	2020	Biological	
NE	COVID-19	EM-3523-NE	2020	Biological	
IA	COVID-19	EM-3524-IA	2020	Biological	
MI	SEVERE STORMS AND FLOODING	EM-3525-MI	2020	Dam/Levee Break	
SD	COVID-19	EM-3526-SD	2020	Biological	
LA	TROPICAL STORM CRISTOBAL	EM-3527-LA	2020	Coastal Storm	
AL	COVID-19	EM-3528-AL	2020	Biological	
HI	HURRICANE DOUGLAS	EM-3529-HI	2020	Hurricane	
TX	Hurricane Hanna	EM-3530-TX	2020	Hurricane	
VI	POTENTIAL TROPICAL CYCLONE NINE	EM-3531-VI	2020	Hurricane	
PR	POTENTIAL TROPICAL CYCLONE NINE	EM-3532-PR	2020	Hurricane	
FL	HURRICANE ISAIAS	EM-3533-FL	2020	Hurricane	
NC	HURRICANE ISAIAS	EM-3534-NC	2020	Hurricane	
CT	TROPICAL STORM ISAIAS	EM-3535-CT	2020	Hurricane	
SD	COVID-19	EM-3536-SD	2020	Biological	
PR	TROPICAL STORM LAURA	EM-3537-PR	2020	Hurricane	
LA	TROPICAL STORMS LAURA AND MARCO	EM-3538-LA	2020	Hurricane	
MS	HURRICANE MARCO AND TROPICAL STORM LAURA	EM-3539-MS	2020	Hurricane	
TX	TROPICAL STORMS MARCO AND LAURA	EM-3540-TX	2020	Hurricane	
AR	HURRICANE LAURA	EM-3541-AR	2020	Hurricane	
OR	WILDFIRES	EM-3542-OR	2020	Fire	
LA	HURRICANE SALLY	EM-3543-LA	2020	Hurricane	
MS	HURRICANE SALLY	EM-3544-MS	2020	Hurricane	
AL	HURRICANE SALLY	EM-3545-AL	2020	Hurricane	
FL	HURRICANE SALLY	EM-3546-FL	2020	Hurricane	
NY	COVID-19	EM-3557-NY	2020	Biological	
NM	COVID-19	EM-3558-NM	2020	Biological	
NM	COVID-19	EM-3559-NM	2020	Biological	
OK	COVID-19	EM-3570-OK	2020	Biological	
OK	COVID-19	EM-3578-OK	2020	Biological	
OK	COVID-19	EM-3579-OK	2020	Biological	
NM	COVID-19	EM-3580-NM	2020	Biological	
FL	HURRICANE MICHAEL	EM-3405-FL	2019	Hurricane	
GA	HURRICANE MICHAEL	EM-3406-GA	2019	Hurricane	
AL	HURRICANE MICHAEL	EM-3407-AL	2019	Hurricane	
MP	TYPHOON YUTU	EM-3408-MP	2019	Typhoon	
CA	WILDFIRES	EM-3409-CA	2019	Fire	
AK	EARTHQUAKE	EM-3410-AK	2019	Earthquake	
OK	FLOODING	EM-3411-OK	2019	Flood	
KS	TORNADOES AND FLOODING	EM-3412-KS	2019	Severe Storm	
LA	FLOODING	EM-3413-LA	2019	Flood	
AR	SEVERE STORMS AND FLOODING	EM-3414-AR	2019	Flood	
CA	EARTHQUAKES	EM-3415-CA	2019	Earthquake	
LA	TROPICAL STORM BARRY	EM-3416-LA	2019	Coastal Storm	
PR	TROPICAL STORM DORIAN	EM-3417-PR	2019	Severe Storm	
VI	HURRICANE DORIAN	EM-3418-VI	2019	Hurricane	
FL	HURRICANE DORIAN	EM-3419-FL	2019	Hurricane	
FL	HURRICANE DORIAN	EM-3420-FL	2019	Hurricane	
SC	HURRICANE DORIAN	EM-3421-SC	2019	Hurricane	
GA	HURRICANE DORIAN	EM-3422-GA	2019	Hurricane	
NC	HURRICANE DORIAN	EM-3423-NC	2019	Hurricane	
LA	TROPICAL STORM NATE	EM-3392-LA	2018	Hurricane	
MS	HURRICANE NATE	EM-3393-MS	2018	Hurricane	
AL	HURRICANE NATE	EM-3394-AL	2018	Hurricane	
FL	HURRICANE NATE	EM-3395-FL	2018	Hurricane	
CA	WILDFIRES	EM-3396-CA	2018	Fire	
AS	TROPICAL STORM GITA	EM-3397-AS	2018	Hurricane	
CA	WILDFIRE	EM-3398-CA	2018	Fire	
HI	HURRICANE LANE	EM-3399-HI	2018	Hurricane	
SC	HURRICANE FLORENCE	EM-3400-SC	2018	Hurricane	
NC	HURRICANE FLORENCE	EM-3401-NC	2018	Hurricane	
MP	TYPHOON MANGKHUT	EM-3402-MP	2018	Typhoon	
VA	HURRICANE FLORENCE	EM-3403-VA	2018	Hurricane	
HI	TROPICAL STORM OLIVIA	EM-3404-HI	2018	Hurricane	
FL	HURRICANE MATTHEW	EM-3377-FL	2017	Hurricane	
SC	HURRICANE MATTHEW	EM-3378-SC	2017	Hurricane	
GA	HURRICANE MATTHEW	EM-3379-GA	2017	Hurricane	
NC	HURRICANE MATTHEW	EM-3380-NC	2017	Hurricane	
CA	POTENTIAL FAILURE OF THE EMERGENCY SPILLWAY AT OROVILLE LAKE	EM-3381-CA	2017	Dam/Levee Break	
LA	TROPICAL STORM HARVEY	EM-3382-LA	2017	Hurricane	
VI	HURRICANE IRMA	EM-3383-VI	2017	Hurricane	
PR	HURRICANE IRMA	EM-3384-PR	2017	Hurricane	
FL	HURRICANE IRMA	EM-3385-FL	2017	Hurricane	
SC	HURRICANE IRMA	EM-3386-SC	2017	Hurricane	
GA	HURRICANE IRMA	EM-3387-GA	2017	Hurricane	
FL	HURRICANE IRMA	EM-3388-FL	2017	Hurricane	
AL	HURRICANE IRMA	EM-3389-AL	2017	Hurricane	
VI	HURRICANE MARIA	EM-3390-VI	2017	Hurricane	
PR	HURRICANE MARIA	EM-3391-PR	2017	Hurricane	
SC	SEVERE STORMS AND FLOODING	EM-3373-SC	2016	Severe Storm	
MO	SEVERE STORMS, TORNADOES, STRAIGHT-LINE WINDS, AND FLOODING	EM-3374-MO	2016	Flood	
MI	CONTAMINATED WATER	EM-3375-MI	2016	Toxic Substances	
LA	FLOODING	EM-3376-LA	2016	Flood	
WA	WILDFIRES	EM-3372-WA	2015	Fire	

=== 2000 - 2015 ===
State	Name	FEMA disaster code	Year declared	Disaster type	Notes
WV	CHEMICAL SPILL	EM-3366-WV	2014	Chemical	
PA	SEVERE WINTER STORM	EM-3367-PA	2014	Severe Ice Storm	
GA	SEVERE WINTER STORM	EM-3368-GA	2014	Severe Ice Storm	
SC	SEVERE WINTER STORM	EM-3369-SC	2014	Severe Ice Storm	
WA	FLOODING AND MUDSLIDES	EM-3370-WA	2014	Mud/Landslide	
WA	WILDFIRES	EM-3371-WA	2014	Fire	
MD	HURRICANE SANDY	EM-3349-MD	2013	Hurricane	
MA	HURRICANE SANDY	EM-3350-MA	2013	Hurricane	
NY	HURRICANE SANDY	EM-3351-NY	2013	Hurricane	
DC	HURRICANE SANDY	EM-3352-DC	2013	Hurricane	
CT	HURRICANE SANDY	EM-3353-CT	2013	Hurricane	
NJ	HURRICANE SANDY	EM-3354-NJ	2013	Hurricane	
RI	HURRICANE SANDY	EM-3355-RI	2013	Hurricane	
PA	HURRICANE SANDY	EM-3356-PA	2013	Hurricane	
DE	HURRICANE SANDY	EM-3357-DE	2013	Hurricane	
WV	HURRICANE SANDY	EM-3358-WV	2013	Hurricane	
VA	HURRICANE SANDY	EM-3359-VA	2013	Hurricane	
NH	HURRICANE SANDY	EM-3360-NH	2013	Hurricane	
CT	SEVERE WINTER STORM	EM-3361-CT	2013	Severe Storm	
MA	EXPLOSIONS	EM-3362-MA	2013	Terrorist	
TX	EXPLOSION	EM-3363-TX	2013	Other	
ND	FLOODING	EM-3364-ND	2013	Flood	
CO	SEVERE STORMS, FLOODING, LANDSLIDES, AND MUDSLIDES	EM-3365-CO	2013	Flood	
CT	SEVERE STORM	EM-3342-CT	2012	Severe Storm	
MA	SEVERE STORM	EM-3343-MA	2012	Severe Storm	
NH	SEVERE STORM	EM-3344-NH	2012	Severe Storm	
WV	SEVERE STORMS	EM-3345-WV	2012	Severe Storm	
OH	SEVERE STORMS	EM-3346-OH	2012	Severe Storm	
LA	TROPICAL STORM ISAAC	EM-3347-LA	2012	Hurricane	
MS	TROPICAL STORM ISAAC	EM-3348-MS	2012	Hurricane	
OK	SEVERE WINTER STORM	EM-3316-OK	2011	Severe Storm	
MO	SEVERE WINTER STORM	EM-3317-MO	2011	Severe Storm	
ND	FLOODING	EM-3318-ND	2011	Flood	
AL	SEVERE STORMS, TORNADOES, AND STRAIGHT-LINE WINDS	EM-3319-AL	2011	Severe Storm	
MS	FLOODING	EM-3320-MS	2011	Flood	
TN	FLOODING	EM-3321-TN	2011	Flood	
LA	FLOODING	EM-3322-LA	2011	Flood	
NE	FLOODING	EM-3323-NE	2011	Flood	
KS	FLOODING	EM-3324-KS	2011	Flood	
MO	FLOODING	EM-3325-MO	2011	Flood	
PR	HURRICANE IRENE	EM-3326-PR	2011	Hurricane	
NC	HURRICANE IRENE	EM-3327-NC	2011	Hurricane	
NY	HURRICANE IRENE	EM-3328-NY	2011	Hurricane	
VA	HURRICANE IRENE	EM-3329-VA	2011	Hurricane	
MA	HURRICANE IRENE	EM-3330-MA	2011	Hurricane	
CT	HURRICANE IRENE	EM-3331-CT	2011	Hurricane	
NJ	HURRICANE IRENE	EM-3332-NJ	2011	Hurricane	
NH	HURRICANE IRENE	EM-3333-NH	2011	Hurricane	
RI	HURRICANE IRENE	EM-3334-RI	2011	Hurricane	
MD	HURRICANE IRENE	EM-3335-MD	2011	Hurricane	
DE	HURRICANE IRENE	EM-3336-DE	2011	Hurricane	
DC	HURRICANE IRENE	EM-3337-DC	2011	Hurricane	
VT	HURRICANE IRENE	EM-3338-VT	2011	Hurricane	
PA	HURRICANE IRENE	EM-3339-PA	2011	Hurricane	
PA	REMNANTS OF TROPICAL STORM LEE	EM-3340-PA	2011	Flood	
NY	REMNANTS OF TROPICAL STORM LEE	EM-3341-NY	2011	Severe Storm	
PR	EXPLOSIONS AND FIRE	EM-3306-PR	2010	Fire	
AZ	SEVERE WINTER STORM	EM-3307-AZ	2010	Severe Storm	
OK	SEVERE WINTER STORM	EM-3308-OK	2010	Severe Storm	
ND	FLOODING	EM-3309-ND	2010	Flood	
MN	FLOODING	EM-3310-MN	2010	Flood	
RI	SEVERE STORMS AND FLOODING	EM-3311-RI	2010	Severe Storm	
MA	WATER MAIN BREAK	EM-3312-MA	2010	Other	
TX	TROPICAL STORM ALEX	EM-3313-TX	2010	Hurricane	
NC	HURRICANE EARL	EM-3314-NC	2010	Hurricane	
MA	HURRICANE EARL	EM-3315-MA	2010	Hurricane	
MA	SEVERE WINTER STORM	EM-3296-MA	2009	Severe Storm	
NH	SEVERE WINTER STORM	EM-3297-NH	2009	Severe Storm	
ME	SEVERE WINTER STORM	EM-3298-ME	2009	Severe Storm	
NY	SEVERE WINTER STORM	EM-3299-NY	2009	Severe Storm	
DC	56TH PRESIDENTIAL INAUGURATION	EM-3300-DC	2009	Other	
AR	SEVERE WINTER STORM	EM-3301-AR	2009	Severe Ice Storm	
KY	SEVERE WINTER STORM	EM-3302-KY	2009	Severe Ice Storm	
MO	SEVERE WINTER STORM	EM-3303-MO	2009	Severe Ice Storm	
MN	SEVERE STORMS AND FLOODING	EM-3304-MN	2009	Severe Storm	
OK	RECORD SNOW AND NEAR RECORD SNOW	EM-3305-OK	2009	Snowstorm	
CA	WILDFIRES	EM-3279-CA	2008	Fire	
OK	SEVERE WINTER STORMS	EM-3280-OK	2008	Severe Ice Storm	
MO	SEVERE WINTER STORMS	EM-3281-MO	2008	Severe Ice Storm	
KS	SEVERE WINTER STORMS	EM-3282-KS	2008	Severe Storm	
IL	RECORD SNOW AND NEAR RECORD SNOW	EM-3283-IL	2008	Snowstorm	
TX	WILDFIRES	EM-3284-TX	2008	Fire	
WI	RECORD SNOW AND NEAR RECORD SNOW	EM-3285-WI	2008	Snowstorm	
OH	RECORD SNOW AND NEAR RECORD SNOW	EM-3286-OH	2008	Snowstorm	
CA	WILDFIRES	EM-3287-CA	2008	Fire	
FL	TROPICAL STORM FAY	EM-3288-FL	2008	Severe Storm	
LA	HURRICANE GUSTAV	EM-3289-LA	2008	Hurricane	
TX	HURRICANE GUSTAV	EM-3290-TX	2008	Hurricane	
MS	HURRICANE GUSTAV	EM-3291-MS	2008	Hurricane	
AL	HURRICANE GUSTAV	EM-3292-AL	2008	Hurricane	
FL	HURRICANE IKE	EM-3293-FL	2008	Hurricane	
TX	HURRICANE IKE	EM-3294-TX	2008	Hurricane	
LA	HURRICANE IKE	EM-3295-LA	2008	Hurricane	
NY	LAKE EFFECT SNOWSTORM	EM-3268-NY	2007	Snowstorm	
IL	SNOW	EM-3269-IL	2007	Snowstorm	
CO	SNOW	EM-3270-CO	2007	Snowstorm	
CO	SNOW	EM-3271-CO	2007	Snowstorm	
OK	SEVERE WINTER STORMS AND FLOODING	EM-3272-OK	2007	Severe Ice Storm	
NY	RECORD SNOW AND NEAR RECORD SNOW	EM-3273-NY	2007	Snowstorm	
IN	SNOW	EM-3274-IN	2007	Snowstorm	
IA	SNOW	EM-3275-IA	2007	Snowstorm	
FM	DROUGHT	EM-3276-FM	2007	Drought	
TX	HURRICANE DEAN	EM-3277-TX	2007	Hurricane	
MN	BRIDGE COLLAPSE	EM-3278-MN	2007	Other	
MA	SEVERE STORMS AND FLOODING	EM-3264-MA	2006	Severe Storm	
ME	SNOW	EM-3265-ME	2006	Snowstorm	
CT	SNOW	EM-3266-CT	2006	Snowstorm	
MO	SEVERE STORMS	EM-3267-MO	2006	Severe Storm	
IN	SNOW	EM-3197-IN	2005	Snowstorm	
OH	SNOW	EM-3198-OH	2005	Snowstorm	
IL	RECORD/NEAR RECORD SNOW	EM-3199-IL	2005	Snowstorm	
CT	RECORD SNOW	EM-3200-CT	2005	Snowstorm	
MA	RECORD AND/OR NEAR RECORD SNOW	EM-3201-MA	2005	Snowstorm	
NV	RECORD AND/OR NEAR RECORD SNOW	EM-3202-NV	2005	Snowstorm	
RI	RECORD SNOW	EM-3203-RI	2005	Snowstorm	
NV	SNOW	EM-3204-NV	2005	Snowstorm	
ME	RECORD AND/OR NEAR RECORD SNOW	EM-3205-ME	2005	Snowstorm	
ME	RECORD AND/OR NEAR RECORD SNOW	EM-3206-ME	2005	Snowstorm	
NH	RECORD AND/OR NEAR RECORD SNOW	EM-3207-NH	2005	Snowstorm	
NH	RECORD SNOW	EM-3208-NH	2005	Snowstorm	
ME	SNOW	EM-3209-ME	2005	Snowstorm	
ME	RECORD SNOW	EM-3210-ME	2005	Snowstorm	
NH	RECORD SNOW	EM-3211-NH	2005	Snowstorm	
LA HURRICANE KATRINA	EM-3212-LA	2005	Hurricane		
MS	HURRICANE KATRINA	EM-3213-MS	2005	Hurricane	
AL	HURRICANE KATRINA	EM-3214-AL	2005	Hurricane	
AR	HURRICANE KATRINA EVACUATION	EM-3215-AR	2005	Hurricane	
TX	HURRICANE KATRINA EVACUATION	EM-3216-TX	2005	Hurricane	
TN	HURRICANE KATRINA EVACUATION	EM-3217-TN	2005	Hurricane	
GA	HURRICANE KATRINA EVACUATION	EM-3218-GA	2005	Hurricane	
OK	HURRICANE KATRINA EVACUATION	EM-3219-OK	2005	Hurricane	
FL	HURRICANE KATRINA EVACUATION	EM-3220-FL	2005	Hurricane	
WV	HURRICANE KATRINA EVACUATION	EM-3221-WV	2005	Hurricane	
NC	HURRICANE KATRINA EVACUATION	EM-3222-NC	2005	Hurricane	
UT	HURRICANE KATRINA EVACUATION	EM-3223-UT	2005	Coastal Storm	
CO	HURRICANE KATRINA EVACUATION	EM-3224-CO	2005	Coastal Storm	
MI	HURRICANE KATRINA EVACUATION	EM-3225-MI	2005	Hurricane	
DC	HURRICANE KATRINA EVACUATION	EM-3226-DC	2005	Hurricane	
WA	HURRICANE KATRINA EVACUATION	EM-3227-WA	2005	Coastal Storm	
OR	HURRICANE KATRINA EVACUATION	EM-3228-OR	2005	Coastal Storm	
NM	HURRICANE KATRINA EVACUATION	EM-3229-NM	2005	Hurricane	
IL	HURRICANE KATRINA EVACUATION	EM-3230-IL	2005	Hurricane	
KY	HURRICANE KATRINA	EM-3231-KY	2005	Hurricane	
MO	HURRICANE KATRINA EVACUATION	EM-3232-MO	2005	Hurricane	
SC	HURRICANE KATRINA EVACUATION	EM-3233-SC	2005	Hurricane	
SD	HURRICANE KATRINA EVACUATION	EM-3234-SD	2005	Coastal Storm	
PA	HURRICANE KATRINA	EM-3235-PA	2005	Hurricane	
KS	HURRICANE KATRINA EVACUATION	EM-3236-KS	2005	Hurricane	
AL	HURRICANE KATRINA EVACUATION	EM-3237-AL	2005	Hurricane	
IN	HURRICANE KATRINA EVACUATION	EM-3238-IN	2005	Hurricane	
IA	HURRICANE KATRINA EVACUATION	EM-3239-IA	2005	Hurricane	
VA	HURRICANE KATRINA EVACUATION	EM-3240-VA	2005	Hurricane	
AZ	HURRICANE KATRINA EVACUATION	EM-3241-AZ	2005	Hurricane	
MN	HURRICANE KATRINA EVACUATION	EM-3242-MN	2005	Hurricane	
NV	HURRICANE KATRINA EVACUATION	EM-3243-NV	2005	Hurricane	
ID	HURRICANE KATRINA	EM-3244-ID	2005	Hurricane	
NE	HURRICANE KATRINA EVACUEES	EM-3245-NE	2005	Hurricane	
CT	HURRICANE KATRINA EVACUATION	EM-3246-CT	2005	Hurricane	
ND	HURRICANE KATRINA EVACUATION	EM-3247-ND	2005	Coastal Storm	
CA	HURRICANE KATRINA EVACUATION	EM-3248-CA	2005	Hurricane	
WI	HURRICANE KATRINA EVACUATION	EM-3249-WI	2005	Hurricane	
OH	HURRICANE KATRINA EVACUATION	EM-3250-OH	2005	Hurricane	
MD	HURRICANE KATRINA EVACUATION	EM-3251-MD	2005	Hurricane	
MA	HURRICANE KATRINA EVACUATION	EM-3252-MA	2005	Hurricane	
MT	HURRICANE KATRINA EVACUATION	EM-3253-MT	2005	Hurricane	
NC	HURRICANE OPHELIA	EM-3254-NC	2005	Hurricane	
RI	HURRICANE KATRINA EVACUATION	EM-3255-RI	2005	Hurricane	
ME	HURRICANE KATRINA EVACUATION	EM-3256-ME	2005	Hurricane	
NJ	HURRICANE KATRINA EVACUATION	EM-3257-NJ	2005	Hurricane	
NH	HURRICANE KATRINA EVACUATION	EM-3258-NH	2005	Hurricane	
FL	TROPICAL STORM RITA	EM-3259-FL	2005	Hurricane	
LA	HURRICANE RITA	EM-3260-LA	2005	Hurricane	
TX	HURRICANE RITA	EM-3261-TX	2005	Hurricane	
NY	HURRICANE KATRINA EVACUATION	EM-3262-NY	2005	Hurricane	
DE	HURRICANE KATRINA EVACUATION	EM-3263-DE	2005	Hurricane	
ME	SNOW	EM-3190-ME	2004	Snowstorm	
MA	SNOW	EM-3191-MA	2004	Snowstorm	
CT	SNOW	EM-3192-CT	2004	Snowstorm	
NH	SNOW	EM-3193-NH	2004	Snowstorm	
ME	SNOW	EM-3194-ME	2004	Snowstorm	
NY	SNOW	EM-3195-NY	2004	Snowstorm	
ND	SNOW	EM-3196-ND	2004	Snowstorm	
TX	LOSS OF THE SPACE SHUTTLE COLUMBIA	EM-3171-TX	2003	Other	
LA	LOSS OF SPACE SHUTTLE COLUMBIA	EM-3172-LA	2003	Other	
NY	SNOWSTORMS	EM-3173-NY	2003	Snowstorm	
ME	SNOW	EM-3174-ME	2003	Snowstorm	
MA	SNOW	EM-3175-MA	2003	Snowstorm	
CT	SNOW	EM-3176-CT	2003	Snowstorm	
NH	SNOW	EM-3177-NH	2003	Snowstorm	
DC	SNOW	EM-3178-DC	2003	Severe Storm	
MD	SNOW	EM-3179-MD	2003	Severe Storm	
PA	SNOW	EM-3180-PA	2003	Severe Storm	
NJ	SNOW	EM-3181-NJ	2003	Snowstorm	
RI	SNOW	EM-3182-RI	2003	Snowstorm	
DE	SNOW	EM-3183-DE	2003	Snowstorm	
NY	SNOW	EM-3184-NY	2003	Snowstorm	
CO	SNOW	EM-3185-CO	2003	Snowstorm	
NY	POWER OUTAGE	EM-3186-NY	2003	Other	
OH	POWER OUTAGE	EM-3187-OH	2003	Other	
NJ	POWER OUTAGE	EM-3188-NJ	2003	Other	
MI	POWER OUTAGE	EM-3189-MI	2003	Other	
NY	SNOW	EM-3170-NY	2002	Snowstorm	
NY	WEST NILE VIRUS	EM-3155-NY	2001	Other	
NJ	WEST NILE VIRUS	EM-3156-NJ	2001	Other	
NY	SNOW	EM-3157-NY	2001	Snowstorm	
OK	SEVERE WINTER AND ICE STORM	EM-3158-OK	2001	Severe Ice Storm	
AR	SEVERE WINTER ICE STORM	EM-3159-AR	2001	Severe Ice Storm	
MI	SNOW	EM-3160-MI	2001	Snowstorm	
IL	ILLINOIS WINTER SNOW STORMS	EM-3161-IL	2001	Snowstorm	
IN	SNOW	EM-3162-IN	2001	Snowstorm	
WI	SNOW	EM-3163-WI	2001	Snowstorm	
ME	SNOW	EM-3164-ME	2001	Snowstorm	
MA	SNOW	EM-3165-MA	2001	Snowstorm	
NH	SNOW	EM-3166-NH	2001	Snowstorm	
VT	SNOW	EM-3167-VT	2001	Snowstorm	
VA	FIRES AND EXPLOSIONS	EM-3168-VA	2001	Fire	
NJ	FIRES AND EXPLOSIONS	EM-3169-NJ	2001	Fire	
FL	TROPICAL STORM IRENE - FLORIDA	EM-3150-FL	2000	Hurricane	
PR	HURRICANE LENNY	EM-3151-PR	2000	Hurricane	
VI	HURRICANE LENNY	EM-3152-VI	2000	Hurricane	
MA	WAREHOUSE FIRE.	EM-3153-MA	2000	Fire	
NM	SEVERE FIRE THREATS	EM-3154-NM	2000	Fire	

=== 1985 - 2000 ===
State	Name	FEMA disaster code	Year declared	Disaster type	Notes
IL	IL-WINTER STORM 1/1/99	EM-3134-IL	1999	Snowstorm	
IN	IN-WINTER STORM 12/23/98	EM-3135-IN	1999	Snowstorm	
NY	SNOW	EM-3136-NY	1999	Snowstorm	
MI	MI - SEVERE WEATHER 1/2 /99	EM-3137-MI	1999	Snowstorm	
NY	SNOW	EM-3138-NY	1999	Snowstorm	
FL	FL-FIRES 04/15/99	EM-3139-FL	1999	Fire	
CA	CA-WILDFIRES-08/25/1999	EM-3140-CA	1999	Fire	
NC	HURRICANE DENNIS	EM-3141-NC	1999	Hurricane	
TX	EXTREME FIRE HAZARDS	EM-3142-TX	1999	Fire	
FL	HURRICANE FLOYD EMERGENCY DECLARATIONS	EM-3143-FL	1999	Hurricane	
GA	HURRICANE FLOYD EMERGENCY DECLARATIONS	EM-3144-GA	1999	Hurricane	
SC	HURRICANE FLOYD EMERGENCY DECLARATIONS	EM-3145-SC	1999	Hurricane	
NC	HURRICANE FLOYD EMERGENCY DECLARATIONS	EM-3146-NC	1999	Hurricane	
VA	HURRICANE FLOYD EMERGENCY DECLARATIONS	EM-3147-VA	1999	Hurricane	
NJ	HURRICANE FLOYD EMERGENCY DECLARATIONS	EM-3148-NJ	1999	Hurricane	
NY	HURRICANE FLOYD EMERGENCY DECLARATIONS	EM-3149-NY	1999	Hurricane	
AR	TORNADOES, FLOODING HIGH WINDS	EM-3125-AR	1998	Tornado	
KS	DEBRUCE GRAIN ELEVATOR EXPLOSION (SEDGWICK CTY)	EM-3126-KS	1998	Other	
TX	FIRE	EM-3127-TX	1998	Fire	
NM	EXTREME FIRE HAZARDS	EM-3128-NM	1998	Fire	
VI	HURRICANE GEORGES (DIRECT FEDERAL ASSIST FIRST 72 HRS)	EM-3129-VI	1998	Hurricane	
PR	HURRICANE GEORGES (DIRECT FEDERAL ASSIST FIRST 72 HRS)	EM-3130-PR	1998	Hurricane	
FL	HURRICANE GRORGES	EM-3131-FL	1998	Hurricane	
MS	HURRICANE GEORGES	EM-3132-MS	1998	Hurricane	
AL	HURRICANE GEORGES	EM-3133-AL	1998	Hurricane	
MA	EXTREME WEATHER CONDITIONS AND FLOODING	EM-3119-MA	1997	Flood	
CA	SEVERE FIRESTORMS	EM-3120-CA	1997	Fire	
ME	SEVERE STORM,HEAVY RAINS, FLOODING, HIGH WINDS	EM-3121-ME	1997	Severe Storm	
HI	SEVERE STORMS AND FLOODING	EM-3122-HI	1997	Severe Storm	
RI	MAJOR WATER MAIN BREAK	EM-3123-RI	1997	Other	
PR	GAS LEAK EXPLOSION	EM-3124-PR	1997	Other	
TX	EXTREME FIRE HAZARD	EM-3117-TX	1996	Fire	
OK	EXTREME FIRE HAZARD	EM-3118-OK	1996	Fire	
OK	EXPLOSION AT FEDERAL COURTHOUSE IN OKLAHOMA CITY	EM-3115-OK	1995	Human Cause	
FL	HURRICANE ERIN	EM-3116-FL	1995	Hurricane	
FL	TROPICAL STORM ALBERTO	EM-3114-FL	1994	Flood	
TN	SEVERE SNOWFALL, WINTER STORM	EM-3095-TN	1993	Snowstorm	
AL	SEVERE SNOWFALL, WINTER STORM	EM-3096-AL	1993	Snowstorm	
GA	SEVERE SNOWFALL, WINTER STORM	EM-3097-GA	1993	Snowstorm	
CT	SEVERE WINDS & BLIZZARD, RECORD SNOWFALL	EM-3098-CT	1993	Snowstorm	
ME	BLIZZARDS, SEVERE WINDS & SNOWFALL, COASTAL STORM	EM-3099-ME	1993	Snowstorm	
MD	SEVERE SNOWFALL & WINTER STORM	EM-3100-MD	1993	Snowstorm	
NH	BLIZZARDS, HIGH WINDS & RECORD SNOWFALL	EM-3101-NH	1993	Snowstorm	
RI	BLIZZARDS, HIGH WINDS & RECORD SNOWFALL	EM-3102-RI	1993	Snowstorm	
MA	BLIZZARDS, HIGH WINDS & RECORD SNOWFALL	EM-3103-MA	1993	Snowstorm	
KY	SEVERE SNOWFALL & WINTER STORM	EM-3104-KY	1993	Snowstorm	
PA	SEVERE SNOWFALL & WINTER STORM	EM-3105-PA	1993	Snowstorm	
NJ	SEVERE BLIZZARD	EM-3106-NJ	1993	Snowstorm	
NY	SEVERE BLIZZARD	EM-3107-NY	1993	Snowstorm	
DC	SEVERE SNOWFALL & WINTER STORM	EM-3108-DC	1993	Snowstorm	
WV	SEVERE SNOWFALL & WINTER STORM	EM-3109-WV	1993	Snowstorm	
NC	SEVERE SNOWFALL & WINTER STORM	EM-3110-NC	1993	Snowstorm	
DE	SEVERE SNOWFALL & WINTER STORM	EM-3111-DE	1993	Snowstorm	
VA	SEVERE WINTER STORM	EM-3112-VA	1993	Snowstorm	
TX	EXTREME FIRE HAZARD	EM-3113-TX	1993	Drought	
FM	DROUGHT	EM-3093-FM	1992	Drought	
RI	WATER CONTAMINATION	EM-3094-RI	1992	Toxic Substances	
WY	METHANE GAS SEEPAGE	EM-3092-WY	1987	Toxic Substances	

=== 1970 - 1985 ===
State	Name	FEMA disaster code	Year declared	Disaster type	Notes
MS	SEVERE STORMS & FLOODING	EM-3087-MS	1984	Flood	
AL	SEVERE STORMS & TORNADOES	EM-3088-AL	1984	Tornado	
GA	SEVERE STORMS & TORNADOES	EM-3089-GA	1984	Tornado	
LA	SEVERE STORMS & TORNADOES	EM-3090-LA	1984	Tornado	
WI	SEVERE STORMS & FLOODING	EM-3091-WI	1984	Flood	
MS	TORNADOES	EM-3084-MS	1982	Tornado	
AR	SEVERE STORMS & TORNADOES	EM-3085-AR	1982	Tornado	
WA	THREAT OF FLOODING AT SPIRIT LAKE	EM-3086-WA	1982	Flood	
NJ	WATER SHORTAGE	EM-3083-NJ	1981	Drought	
CA	TORRENTIAL RAIN, HIGH TIDE & WINDS	EM-3078-CA	1980	Coastal Storm	
FL	UNDOCUMENTED ALIENS	EM-3079-FL	1980	Human Cause	
NY	CHEMICAL WASTE, LOVE CANAL	EM-3080-NY	1980	Toxic Substances	
PA	SEVERE STORMS & TORNADOES	EM-3081-PA	1980	Tornado	
ME	RED TIDE-TOXIC ALGAE	EM-3082-ME	1980	Fishing Losses	
CA	BRUSH FIRES	EM-3067-CA	1979	Fire	
IL	BLIZZARDS & SNOWSTORMS	EM-3068-IL	1979	Snowstorm	
WI	BLIZZARDS & SNOWSTORMS	EM-3069-WI	1979	Snowstorm	
WA	FLOODING	EM-3070-WA	1979	Flood	
MO	ICE JAM & FLOODING	EM-3071-MO	1979	Flood	
GA	RAIN, FLOODING, MUDSLIDE	EM-3072-GA	1979	Flood	
NH	FLOODING	EM-3073-NH	1979	Flood	
AL	FLOODING	EM-3074-AL	1979	Flood	
FL	SEVERE STORMS & FLOODING	EM-3075-FL	1979	Flood	
IA	SEVERE STORMS & TORNADOES	EM-3076-IA	1979	Tornado	
MS	STORMS, TORNADOES, FLOODS	EM-3077-MS	1979	Severe Storm	
WI	WINDS, HAIL & RAIN	EM-3048-WI	1978	Severe Storm	
AR	TORNADOES	EM-3054-AR	1978	Tornado	
OH	BLIZZARDS & SNOWSTORMS	EM-3055-OH	1978	Snowstorm	
IN	BLIZZARDS & SNOWSTORMS	EM-3056-IN	1978	Snowstorm	
MI	BLIZZARDS & SNOWSTORMS	EM-3057-MI	1978	Snowstorm	
RI	BLIZZARD & SNOWSTORMS	EM-3058-RI	1978	Snowstorm	
MA	BLIZZARD & SNOWSTORMS	EM-3059-MA	1978	Snowstorm	
CT	BLIZZARD & SNOWSTORMS	EM-3060-CT	1978	Snowstorm	
ND	BLIZZARD & SNOWSTORMS	EM-3061-ND	1978	Snowstorm	
AR	TORNADOES	EM-3062-AR	1978	Tornado	
MS	TORNADOES	EM-3063-MS	1978	Tornado	
AL	TORNADOES	EM-3064-AL	1978	Tornado	
ND	SEVERE STORMS & TORNADOES	EM-3065-ND	1978	Tornado	
NY	CHEMICAL WASTE, LOVE CANAL	EM-3066-NY	1978	Toxic Substances	
VA	DROUGHT	EM-3018-VA	1977	Drought	
AR	DROUGHT	EM-3019-AR	1977	Drought	
OK	URBAN FIRE	EM-3020-OK	1977	Fire	
WV	DROUGHT	EM-3021-WV	1977	Drought	
NE	DROUGHT	EM-3022-NE	1977	Drought	
CA	DROUGHT	EM-3023-CA	1977	Drought	
UT	DROUGHT	EM-3024-UT	1977	Drought	
CO	DROUGHT	EM-3025-CO	1977	Drought	
PA	SNOWSTORMS	EM-3026-PA	1977	Snowstorm	
NY	SNOWSTORMS	EM-3027-NY	1977	Snowstorm	
IN	SNOWSTORMS	EM-3028-IN	1977	Snowstorm	
OH	SNOWSTORMS	EM-3029-OH	1977	Snowstorm	
MI	SNOWSTORMS	EM-3030-MI	1977	Snowstorm	
LA	DROUGHT & FREEZING	EM-3031-LA	1977	Snowstorm	
MS	DROUGHT & FREEZING	EM-3032-MS	1977	Snowstorm	
NC	DROUGHT & FREEZING	EM-3033-NC	1977	Snowstorm	
NM	DROUGHT	EM-3034-NM	1977	Drought	
MI	DROUGHT	EM-3035-MI	1977	Drought	
IA	DROUGHT	EM-3036-IA	1977	Drought	
WA	DROUGHT	EM-3037-WA	1977	Drought	
AZ	DROUGHT	EM-3038-AZ	1977	Drought	
OR	DROUGHT	EM-3039-OR	1977	Drought	
ID	DROUGHT	EM-3040-ID	1977	Drought	
NV	DROUGHT	EM-3041-NV	1977	Drought	
VI	DROUGHT	EM-3042-VI	1977	Drought	
WY	DROUGHT	EM-3043-WY	1977	Drought	
GA	DROUGHT	EM-3044-GA	1977	Drought	
AL	DROUGHT	EM-3045-AL	1977	Drought	
VA	DROUGHT	EM-3046-VA	1977	Drought	
SC	DROUGHT	EM-3047-SC	1977	Drought	
NC	DROUGHT	EM-3049-NC	1977	Drought	
MT	DROUGHT	EM-3050-MT	1977	Drought	
WV	DROUGHT	EM-3051-WV	1977	Drought	
WV	SEVERE STORMS, LANDSLIDES & FLOODING	EM-3052-WV	1977	Flood	
VT	DROUGHT	EM-3053-VT	1977	Drought	
ND	SEVERE FLOODING	EM-3012-ND	1976	Flood	
MN	DROUGHT	EM-3013-MN	1976	Drought	
WI	DROUGHT	EM-3014-WI	1976	Drought	
SD	DROUGHT	EM-3015-SD	1976	Drought	
ND	DROUGHT	EM-3016-ND	1976	Drought	
MO	DROUGHT	EM-3017-MO	1976	Drought	
NY	FLOODNG (NYS BARGE CANAL)	EM-3004-NY	1975	Flood	
NJ	SEVERE STORMS, HIGH WINDS & HIGH TIDES	EM-3005-NJ	1975	Coastal Storm	
MS	TORNADOES	EM-3006-MS	1975	Tornado	
AL	TORNADOES	EM-3007-AL	1975	Tornado	
GA	TORNADOES	EM-3008-GA	1975	Tornado	
KY	HIGH WINDS	EM-3009-KY	1975	Other	
MS	HEAVY RAINS & FLOODING	EM-3010-MS	1975	Flood	
LA	HEAVY RAINS & FLOODING	EM-3011-LA	1975	Flood	
VI	DROUGHT, LIVESTOCK LOSSES	EM-3001-VI	1974	Drought	
PR	IMPACT OF DROUGHT	EM-3002-PR	1974	Drought	
AK	POWER FAILURE	EM-3003-AK	1974	Other	

== Major disaster declarations ==
=== 2020 - 2030 ===
State	Name	FEMA disaster code	Year declared	Disaster type	Notes
TX	SEVERE STORMS, STRAIGHT-LINE WINDS, AND FLOODING	DR-4879-TX	2025		
TN	SEVERE STORMS, STRAIGHT-LINE WINDS, TORNADOES, AND FLOODING	DR-4878-TN	2025	Tornado	
MO	SEVERE STORMS, STRAIGHT-LINE WINDS, TORNADOES, AND FLOODING	DR-4876-MO	2025	Tornado	
MO	SEVERE STORMS, STRAIGHT-LINE WINDS, TORNADOES, AND FLOODING	DR-4877-MO	2025	Tornado	
KY	SEVERE STORMS, STRAIGHT-LINE WINDS, AND TORNADOES	DR-4875-KY	2025	Tornado	
MO	SEVERE STORMS, STRAIGHT-LINE WINDS, TORNADOES, AND FLOODING	DR-4872-MO	2025	Tornado	
IA	SEVERE WINTER STORM	DR-4870-IA	2025	Severe Winter Storm	
AR	SEVERE STORMS, TORNADOES, AND FLOODING	DR-4873-AR	2025	Tornado	
OK	WILDFIRES AND STRAIGHT-LINE WINDS	DR-4866-OK	2025	Fire	
MO	SEVERE STORMS, STRAIGHT-LINE WINDS, TORNADOES, AND WILDFIRES	DR-4867-MO	2025	Severe Storm and Fire	
KS	SEVERE STORMS, FIRES, AND WINTER STORM	DR-4869-KS	2025	Severe Winter Storm and Fire	
MO	SEVERE STORMS, STRAIGHT-LINE WINDS, TORNADOES, AND FLOODING	DR-4872-MO	2025	Tornado	
TX	SEVERE STORMS AND FLOODING	DR-4871-TX	2025	Severe Storm	
MS	SEVERE STORMS, STRAIGHT-LINE WINDS, TORNADOES, AND FLOODING	DR-4874-MS	2025	Tornado	
AR	SEVERE STORMS AND TORNADOES	DR-4865-AR	2025	Tornado	
KY	SEVERE STORMS, STRAIGHT-LINE WINDS, TORNADOES, FLOODING, LANDSLIDES, AND MUDSLIDES	DR-4864-KY	2025	Land/Mudslide	
VA	SEVERE WINTER STORMS AND FLOODING	DR-4863-VA	2025	Severe Winter Storm	
OK	SEVERE STORMS, STRAIGHT-LINE WINDS, TORNADOESS, AND FLOODING	DR-4862-OK	2025	Tornado	
WV	SEVERE STORM, STRAIGHT-LINE WINDS, FLOODING, LANDSLIDES, AND MUDSLIDES	DR-4861-WV	2025	Land/Mudslide	
KY	SEVERE STORMS, STRAIGHT-LINE WINDS, FLOODING, LANDSLIDES, AND MUDSLIDES	DR-4860-KY	2025	Land/Mudslide	
AK	SEVERE STORM AND FLOODING	DR-4859-AK	2025	Severe Storm	
AK	NATIVE VILLAGE OF KWIGILLINGOK SEVERE STORM AND FLOODING	DR-4857	2025	Severe Storm	
SC	SEVERE STORMS AND FLOODING	DR-4858-SC	2025	Severe Storm	
CA	WILDFIRES AND STRAIGHT-LINE WINDS	DR-4856-CA	2025	Fire	
MO	SEVERE STORMS, TORNADOES, STRAIGHT-LINE WINDS, AND FLOODING	DR-4855-MO	2025	Tornado	
OR	WILDFIRES	DR-4854-OR	2025	Fire	
AK	NATIVE VILLAGE OF KIPNUK SEVERE STORM AND FLOODING	DR-4853	2025	Severe Storm	
ND	WILDFIRES AND STRAIGHT-LINE WINDS	DR-4852-ND	2024	Fire	
WV	POST TROPICAL STORM HELENE	DR-4851-WV	2024	Tropical Storm	
VA	TROPICAL STORM HELENE	DR-4831-VA	2024	Tropical Storm	
TN	TROPICAL STORM HELENE	DR-4832-TN	2024	Tropical Storm	
AZ	WATCH FIRE	DR-4833-AZ	2024	Fire	
FL	HURRICANE MILTON	DR-4834-FL	2024	Hurricane	
AK	FLOODING	DR-4836-AK	2024	Flood	
NC	POTENTIAL TROPICAL CYCLONE EIGHT	DR-4837-NC	2024	Tropical Storm	
NE	SEVERE STORMS, STRAIGHT-LINE WINDS, TORNADOES, AND FLOODING	DR-4838-NE	2024	Severe Storm	
NY	SEVERE STORM AND FLOOODING	DR-4839-NY	2024	Severe Storm	
AZ	FLOODING	DR-4840-AZ	2024	Flood	
VI	TROPICAL STORM ERNESTO	DR-4841-VI	2024	Tropical Storm	
SD	SEVERE STORM, STRAIGHT-LINE WINDS, AND FLOODING	DR-4842-SD	2024	Severe Storm	
NM	SEVERE STORM AND FLOODING	DR-4843-NM	2024	Flood	
FL	HURRICANE MILTON	DR-4844-FL	2024	Hurricane	
WY	WILDFIRES	DR-4845-WY	2024	Fire	
AK	LANDSLIDES	DR-4846-AK	2024	Mud/Landslide	
MT	SEVERE STORM AND STRAIGHT-LINE WINDS	DR-4847-MT	2024	Severe Storm	
KY	REMNANTS OF HURRICANE HELENE	DR-4848-KY	2024	Tropical Storm	
WA	WILDFIRES	DR-4849-WA	2024	Fire	
PR	TROPICAL STORM ERNESTO	DR-4850-PR	2024	Tropical Storm	
VT	SEVERE STORMS AND FLOODING	DR-4744-VT	2024	Flood	
MT	FLOODING	DR-4745-MT	2024	Flood	
CA	TROPICAL STORM HILARY	DR-4746-CA	2024	Tropical Storm	
KS	SEVERE STORMS, STRAIGHT-LINE WINDS, TORNADOES, AND FLOODING	DR-4747-KS	2024	Severe Storm	
AR	SEVERE STORMS, STRAIGHT-LINE WINDS, AND TORNADOES	DR-4748-AR	2024	Severe Storm	
IL	SEVERE STORMS AND FLOODING	DR-4749-IL	2024	Flood	
CA	TROPICAL STORM HILARY	DR-4750-CA	2024	Hurricane	
TN	SEVERE STORMS AND TORNADOES	DR-4751-TN	2024	Severe Storm	
UT	FLOODING	DR-4752-UT	2024	Flood	
RI	SEVERE STORMS, FLOODING, AND TORNADOES	DR-4753-RI	2024	Severe Storm	
ME	SEVERE STORM AND FLOODING	DR-4754-ME	2024	Severe Storm	
NY	SEVERE STORM AND FLOODING	DR-4755-NY	2024	Flood	
WV	SEVERE STORMS, FLOODING, LANDSLIDES, AND MUDSLIDES	DR-4756-WV	2024	Flood	
MI	SEVERE STORMS, TORNADOES, AND FLOODING	DR-4757-MI	2024	Flood	
CA	SEVERE STORM AND FLOODING	DR-4758-CA	2024	Flood	
WA	WILDFIRES	DR-4759-WA	2024	Fire	
ND	SEVERE WINTER STORM AND STRAIGHT-LINE WINDS	DR-4760-ND	2024	Winter Storm	
NH	SEVERE STORM AND FLOODING	DR-4761-NH	2024	Severe Storm	
VT	SEVERE STORM AND FLOODING	DR-4762-VT	2024	Severe Storm	
AK	SEVERE STORM, LANDSLIDES, AND MUDSLIDES	DR-4763-AK	2024	Mud/Landslide	
ME	SEVERE STORMS AND FLOODING	DR-4764-ME	2024	Severe Storm	
RI	SEVERE STORM AND FLOODING	DR-4765-RI	2024	Severe Storm	
RI	SEVERE STORMS AND FLOODING	DR-4766-RI	2024	Severe Storm	
AK	SEVERE STORM, FLOODING, AND LANDSLIDES	DR-4767-AK	2024	Mud/Landslide	
OR	SEVERE WINTER STORMS, STRAIGHT-LINE WINDS, LANDSLIDES, AND MUDSLIDES	DR-4768-OR	2024	Severe Storm	
CA	SEVERE WINTER STORMS, TORNADOES, FLOODING, LANDSLIDES, AND MUDSLIDES	DR-4769-CA	2024	Severe Storm	
VT	SEVERE WINTER STORM	DR-4770-VT	2024	Severe Storm	
NH	SEVERE STORMS AND FLOODING	DR-4771-NH	2024	Severe Storm	
CA	SEVERE STORMS AND FLOODING	DR-4772-CA	2024	Severe Storm	
CA	SEVERE WINTER STORM	DR-4773-CA	2024	Severe Storm	
KS	SEVERE WINTER STORM	DR-4774-KS	2024	Winter Storm	
WA	SEVERE WINTER STORMS, STRAIGHT-LINE WINDS, FLOODING, LANDSLIDES, AND MUDSLIDES	DR-4775-WA	2024	Severe Storm	
OK	SEVERE STORMS, STRAIGHT-LINE WINDS, TORNADOES, AND FLOODING	DR-4776-OK	2024	Tornado	
OH	TORNADOES	DR-4777-OH	2024	Tornado	
NE	SEVERE STORMS, STRAIGHT-LINE WINDS, AND TORNADOES	DR-4778-NE	2024	Tornado	
IA	SEVERE STORMS AND TORNADOES	DR-4779-IA	2024	Tornado	
MA	SEVERE STORMS AND FLOODING	DR-4780-MA	2024	Flood	
TX	SEVERE STORMS, STRAIGHT-LINE WINDS, TORNADOES, AND FLOODING	DR-4781-TX	2024	Flood	
KY	SEVERE STORMS, STRAIGHT-LINE WINDS, TORNADOES, LANDSLIDES, AND MUDSLIDES	DR-4782-KY	2024	Severe Storm	
WV	SEVERE STORMS, STRAIGHT-LINE WINDS, TORNADOES, FLOODING, LANDSLIDES, AND MUDSLIDES	DR-4783-WV	2024	Severe Storm	
IA	SEVERE STORMS, TORNADOES, AND FLOODING	DR-4784-IA	2024	Severe Storm	
ME	SEVERE WINTER STORM	DR-4785-ME	2024	Winter Storm	
NE	SEVERE WINTER STORM AND STRAIGHT-LINE WINDS	DR-4786-NE	2024	Severe Storm	
WV	SEVERE STORMS, FLOODING, LANDSLIDES, AND MUDSLIDES	DR-4787-WV	2024	Flood	
AR	SEVERE STORMS, STRAIGHT-LINE WINDS, TORNADOES, AND FLOODING	DR-4788-AR	2024	Severe Storm	
ID	SEVERE STORM, FLOODING, LANDSLIDES, AND MUDSLIDES	DR-4789-ID	2024	Flood	
MS	SEVERE STORMS, STRAIGHT-LINE WINDS, TORNADOES, AND FLOODING	DR-4790-MS	2024	Severe Storm	
OK	SEVERE STORMS, STRAIGHT-LINE WINDS, TORNADOES, AND FLOODING	DR-4791-OK	2024	Severe Storm	
TN	SEVERE STORMS, TORNADOES, AND FLOODING	DR-4792-TN	2024	Severe Storm	
HI	SEVERE STORMS, FLOODING, AND LANDSLIDES	DR-4793-HI	2024	Flood	
FL	SEVERE STORMS, STRAIGHT-LINE WINDS, AND TORNADOES	DR-4794-FL	2024	Severe Storm	
NM	SOUTH FORK FIRE, SALT FIRE, AND FLOODING	DR-4795-NM	2024	Fire	
IA	SEVERE STORMS, FLOODING, STRAIGHT-LINE WINDS, AND TORNADOES	DR-4796-IA	2024	Severe Storm	
MN	SEVERE STORMS AND FLOODING	DR-4797-MN	2024	Flood	
TX	HURRICANE BERYL	DR-4798-TX	2024	Hurricane	
NH	SEVERE WINTER STORM AND FLOODING	DR-4799-NH	2024	Winter Storm	
KS	SEVERE STORMS, STRAIGHT-LINE WINDS, TORNADOES, AND FLOODING	DR-4800-KS	2024	Severe Storm	
MT	SEVERE WINTER STORM AND FLOODING	DR-4801-MT	2024	Severe Storm	
OK	SEVERE STORMS	DR-4802-OK	2024	Severe Storm	
MO	SEVERE STORMS, STRAIGHT-LINE WINDS, TORNADOES, AND FLOODING	DR-4803-MO	2024	Severe Storm	
KY	SEVERE STORMS, STRAIGHT-LINE WINDS, TORNADOES, LANDSLIDES, AND MUDSLIDES	DR-4804-KY	2024	Severe Storm	
PR	SEVERE STORMS, FLOODING, LANDSLIDES, AND MUDSLIDES	DR-4805-PR	2024	Flood	
FL	HURRICANE DEBBY	DR-4806-FL	2024	Tropical Storm	
SD	SEVERE STORMS, STRAIGHT-LINE WINDS, AND FLOODING	DR-4807-SD	2024	Flood	
NE	SEVERE STORMS, STRAIGHT-LINE WINDS, TORNADOES, AND FLOODING	DR-4808-NE	2024	Severe Storm	
NM	SEVERE STORMS AND FLOODING	DR-4809-NM	2024	Flood	
VT	SEVERE STORM, FLOODING, LANDSLIDES, AND MUDSLIDES	DR-4810-VT	2024	Severe Storm	
KS	SEVERE STORM, STRAIGHT-LINE WINDS, TORNADOES, AND FLOODING	DR-4811-KS	2024	Severe Storm	
NH	SEVERE STORM AND FLOODING	DR-4812-NH	2024	Severe Storm	
MT	STRAIGHT-LINE WINDS	DR-4813-MT	2024	Straight-Line Winds	
NY	SEVERE STORM, TORNADOES, AND FLOODING	DR-4814-NY	2024	Flood	
PA	TROPICAL STORM DEBBY	DR-4815-PA	2024	Tropical Storm	
VT	SEVERE STORMS AND FLOODING	DR-4816-VT	2024	Flood	
LA	HURRICANE FRANCINE	DR-4817-LA	2024	Hurricane	
NY	SEVERE STORM AND FLOODING	DR-4818-NY	2024	Tropical Storm	
IL	SEVERE STORMS, TORNADOES, STRAIGHT-LINE WINDS, AND FLOODNG	DR-4819-IL	2024	Flood	
CT	SEVERE STORM, FLOODING, LANDSLIDES, AND MUDSLIDES	DR-4820-CT	2024	Severe Storm	
GA	TROPICAL STORM DEBBY	DR-4821-GA	2024	Tropical Storm	
NE	SEVERE STORMS, STRAIGHT-LINE WINDS, TORNADOES, AND FLOODING	DR-4822-NE	2024	Severe Storm	
WA	WILDFIRES	DR-4823-WA	2024	Fire	
KS	SEVERE STORMS, STRAIGHT-LINE WINDS, TORNADOES, AND FLOODING	DR-4824-KS	2024	Severe Storm	
NY	REMNANTS OF TROPICAL STORM DEBBY	DR-4825-NY	2024	Tropical Storm	
VT	SEVERE STORMS, FLOODING, LANDSLIDES, AND MUDSLIDES	DR-4826-VT	2024	Flood	
NC	TROPICAL STORM HELENE	DR-4827-NC	2024	Tropical Storm	
FL	HURRICANE HELENE	DR-4828-FL	2024	Hurricane	
SC	HURRICANE HELENE	DR-4829-SC	2024	Hurricane	
GA	HURRICANE HELENE	DR-4830-GA	2024	Hurricane	
SC	TROPICAL STORM DEBBY	DR-4835-SC	2024	Tropical Storm	
IL	SEVERE STORM AND FLOODING	DR-4676-IL	2023	Flood	
SC	HURRICANE IAN	DR-4677-SC	2023	Hurricane	
WV	SEVERE STORMS, FLOODING, LANDSLIDES, AND MUDSLIDES	DR-4678-WV	2023	Flood	
WV	SEVERE STORMS, FLOODING, LANDSLIDES, AND MUDSLIDES	DR-4679-WV	2023	Severe Storm	
FL	HURRICANE NICOLE	DR-4680-FL	2023	Hurricane	
AZ	FLOODING	DR-4681-AZ	2023	Flood	
WA	SEVERE WINTER STORM, STRAIGHT-LINE WINDS, FLOODING, LANDSLIDES, AND MUDSLIDES	DR-4682-WA	2023	Severe Storm	
CA	SEVERE WINTER STORMS, FLOODING, LANDSLIDES, AND MUDSLIDES	DR-4683-CA	2023	Flood	
AL	SEVERE STORMS, STRAIGHT-LINE WINDS, AND TORNADOES	DR-4684-AL	2023	Severe Storm	
GA	SEVERE STORMS, STRAIGHT-LINE WINDS, AND TORNADOES	DR-4685-GA	2023	Severe Storm	
ND	SEVERE WINTER STORM, SNOWSTORM, AND STRAIGHT-LINE WINDS	DR-4686-ND	2023	Snowstorm	
SD	SEVERE WINTER STORMS AND SNOWSTORM	DR-4687-SD	2023	Winter Storm	
SD	SEVERE WINTER STORMS AND SNOWSTORM	DR-4688-SD	2023	Winter Storm	
SD	SEVERE WINTER STORMS AND SNOWSTORM	DR-4689-SD	2023	Winter Storm	
OK	SEVERE WINTER STORM	DR-4690-OK	2023	Severe Storm	
TN	SEVERE WINTER STORM	DR-4691-TN	2023	Winter Storm	
CA	EARTHQUAKE	DR-4692-CA	2023	Earthquake	
NH	SEVERE STORM AND FLOODING	DR-4693-NH	2023	Severe Storm	
NY	SEVERE WINTER STORM AND SNOWSTORM	DR-4694-NY	2023	Snowstorm	
VT	SEVERE STORM AND FLOODING	DR-4695-VT	2023	Severe Storm	
ME	SEVERE STORM AND FLOODING	DR-4696-ME	2023	Severe Storm	
MS	SEVERE STORMS, STRAIGHT-LINE WINDS, AND TORNADOES	DR-4697-MS	2023	Severe Storm	
AR	SEVERE STORMS AND TORNADOES	DR-4698-AR	2023	Severe Storm	
CA	SEVERE WINTER STORMS, STRAIGHT-LINE WINDS, FLOODING, LANDSLIDES, AND MUDSLIDES	DR-4699-CA	2023	Severe Storm	
AR	SEVERE WINTER STORM	DR-4700-AR	2023	Winter Storm	
TN	SEVERE STORMS, STRAIGHT-LINE WINDS, AND TORNADOES	DR-4701-TN	2023	Severe Storm	
KY	SEVERE STORMS, STRAIGHT-LINE WINDS, TORNADOES, FLOODING, LANDSLIDES, AND MUDSLIDES	DR-4702-KY	2023	Severe Storm	
AZ	SEVERE WINTER STORMS AND FLOODING	DR-4703-AZ	2023	Severe Storm	
IN	SEVERE STORMS, STRAIGHT-LINE WINDS, AND TORNADOES	DR-4704-IN	2023	Severe Storm	
TX	SEVERE WINTER STORM	DR-4705-TX	2023	Winter Storm	
OK	SEVERE STORMS, STRAIGHT-LINE WINDS, AND TORNADOES	DR-4706-OK	2023	Tornado	
CA	SEVERE WINTER STORMS AND MUDSLIDES	DR-4707-CA	2023	Winter Storm	
NV	SEVERE WINTER STORMS, FLOODING, LANDSLIDES, AND MUDSLIDES	DR-4708-NV	2023	Flood	
FL	SEVERE STORMS, TORNADOES, AND FLOODING	DR-4709-FL	2023	Flood	
AL	SEVERE STORMS, STRAIGHT-LINE WINDS, AND TORNADOES	DR-4710-AL	2023	Severe Storm	
KY	SEVERE STORMS, STRAIGHT-LINE WINDS, FLOODING, LANDSLIDES, AND MUDSLIDES	DR-4711-KY	2023	Flood	
TN	SEVERE STORMS, STRAIGHT-LINE WINDS, AND TORNADO	DR-4712-TN	2023	Severe Storm	
CA	SEVERE WINTER STORM AND FLOODING	DR-4713-CA	2023	Severe Storm	
CA	SEVERE STORM AND FLOODING	DR-4714-CA	2023	Severe Storm	
GU	TYPHOON MAWAR	DR-4715-GU	2023	Hurricane	
MP	TYPHOON MAWAR	DR-4716-MP	2023	Tropical Storm	
ND	FLOODING	DR-4717-ND	2023	Flood	
SD	FLOODING	DR-4718-SD	2023	Flood	
ME	SEVERE STORM AND FLOODING	DR-4719-ME	2023	Flood	
VT	SEVERE STORMS, FLOODING, LANDSLIDES, AND MUDSLIDES	DR-4720-VT	2023	Flood	
OK	SEVERE STORMS, STRAIGHT-LINE WINDS, AND TORNADOES	DR-4721-OK	2023	Severe Storm	
MN	SEVERE STORMS AND FLOODING	DR-4722-MN	2023	Flood	
NY	SEVERE STORMS AND FLOODING	DR-4723-NY	2023	Severe Storm	
HI	WILDFIRES AND HIGH WINDS	DR-4724-HI	2023	Fire	
NJ	SEVERE STORM AND FLOODING	DR-4725-NJ	2023	Severe Storm	
MT	FLOODING	DR-4726-MT	2023	Flood	
MS	SEVERE STORMS, STRAIGHT-LINE WINDS, AND TORNADOES.	DR-4727-MS	2023	Severe Storm	
IL	SEVERE STORMS AND FLOODING	DR-4728-IL	2023	Severe Storm	
TN	SEVERE STORMS AND STRAIGHT-LINE WINDS	DR-4729-TN	2023	Severe Storm	
AK	FLOODING	DR-4730-AK	2023	Flood	
CO	SEVERE STORMS, FLOODING, AND TORNADOES	DR-4731-CO	2023	Flood	
IA	FLOODING	DR-4732-IA	2023	Flood	
OR	SEVERE STORM, FLOODING, LANDSLIDES, AND MUDSLIDES	DR-4733-OR	2023	Mud/Landslide	
FL	HURRICANE IDALIA	DR-4734-FL	2023	Hurricane	
TN	SEVERE STORMS AND STRAIGHT-LINE WINDS	DR-4735-TN	2023	Severe Storm	
ME	SEVERE STORM AND FLOODING	DR-4736-ME	2023	Flood	
ME	SEVERE STORM AND FLOODING	DR-4737-ME	2023	Flood	
GA	HURRICANE IDALIA	DR-4738-GA	2023	Hurricane	
WY	FLOODING	DR-4739-WY	2023	Flood	
NH	SEVERE STORMS AND FLOODING	DR-4740-NH	2023	Flood	
MO	SEVERE STORMS, STRAIGHT-LINE WINDS, TORNADOES, AND FLOODING	DR-4741-MO	2023	Severe Storm	
TN	SEVERE STORMS, STRAIGHT-LINE WINDS, AND TORNADO	DR-4742-TN	2023	Severe Storm	
CA	TROPICAL STORM HILARY	DR-4743-CA	2023	Hurricane	
NH	SEVERE STORM AND FLOODING	DR-4624-NH	2022	Flood	
NY	REMNANTS OF TROPICAL STORM FRED	DR-4625-NY	2022	Hurricane	
MS	HURRICANE IDA	DR-4626-MS	2022	Hurricane	
DE	REMNANTS OF HURRICANE IDA	DR-4627-DE	2022	Hurricane	
VA	FLOODING, LANDSLIDES, AND MUDSLIDES	DR-4628-VA	2022	Flood	
CT	REMNANTS OF HURRICANE IDA	DR-4629-CT	2022	Hurricane	
KY	SEVERE STORMS, STRAIGHT-LINE WINDS, FLOODING, AND TORNADOES	DR-4630-KY	2022	Tornado	
WA	WILDFIRES	DR-4631-WA	2022	Fire	
AL	SEVERE STORMS AND FLOODING	DR-4632-AL	2022	Severe Storm	
AR	SEVERE STORMS AND TORNADOES	DR-4633-AR	2022	Tornado	
CO	WILDFIRES AND STRAIGHT-LINE WINDS	DR-4634-CO	2022	Fire	
WA	SEVERE STORMS, STRAIGHT-LINE WINDS, FLOODING, LANDSLIDES, AND MUDSLIDES	DR-4635-WA	2022	Flood	
MO	SEVERE STORMS, STRAIGHT-LINE WINDS, AND TORNADOES	DR-4636-MO	2022	Severe Storm	
TN	SEVERE STORMS, STRAIGHT-LINE WINDS, AND TORNADOES	DR-4637-TN	2022	Tornado	
AK	SEVERE STORMS, STRAIGHT-LINE WINDS, FLOODING, LANDSLIDES, AND MUDSLIDES	DR-4638-AK	2022	Severe Storm	
HI	SEVERE STORMS, FLOODING, AND LANDSLIDES	DR-4639-HI	2022	Severe Storm	
KS	SEVERE STORMS AND STRAIGHT LINE WINDS	DR-4640-KS	2022	Severe Storm	
NE	SEVERE STORMS, STRAIGHT-LINE WINDS, AND TORNADOES	DR-4641-NE	2022	Severe Storm	
IA	SEVERE STORMS, STRAIGHT-LINE WINDS, AND TORNADOES	DR-4642-IA	2022	Severe Storm	
KY	SEVERE STORMS, STRAIGHT-LINE WINDS, TORNADOES, FLOODING, LANDSLIDES	DR-4643-KY	2022	Severe Storm	
VA	SEVERE WINTER STORM AND SNOWSTORM	DR-4644-VA	2022	Severe Storm	
TN	SEVERE WINTER STORM	DR-4645-TN	2022	Severe Storm	
AK	SEVERE WINTER STORM AND STRAIGHT-LINE WINDS	DR-4646-AK	2022	Severe Storm	
ME	SEVERE STORM AND FLOODING	DR-4647-ME	2022	Coastal Storm	
AK	SEVERE WINTER STORM AND STRAIGHT-LINE WINDS	DR-4648-AK	2022	Severe Storm	
PR	SEVERE STORM, FLOODING, AND LANDSLIDES	DR-4649-PR	2022	Flood	
WA	SEVERE WINTER STORMS, SNOWSTORMS, STRAIGHT-LINE WINDS, FLOODIN	DR-4650-WA	2022	Flood	
MA	SEVERE WINTER STORM AND SNOWSTORM	DR-4651-MA	2022	Snowstorm	
NM	WILDFIRES, STRAIGHT-LINE WINDS, FLOODING, MUDFLOWS, AND DEBRIS FLOWS	DR-4652-NM	2022	Fire	
RI	SEVERE WINTER STORM AND SNOWSTORM	DR-4653-RI	2022	Snowstorm	
KS	SEVERE WINTER STORMS AND STRAIGHT-LINE WINDS	DR-4654-KS	2022	Snowstorm	
MT	SEVERE STORM AND FLOODING	DR-4655-MT	2022	Flood	
SD	SEVERE STORM, STRAIGHT-LINE WINDS, TORNADOES, AND FLOODING	DR-4656-SD	2022	Severe Storm	
OK	SEVERE STORMS, TORNADOES, AND FLOODING	DR-4657-OK	2022	Severe Storm	
MN	SEVERE STORMS, STRAIGHT-LINE WINDS, TORNADOES, AND FLOODING	DR-4658-MN	2022	Severe Storm	
MN	SEVERE STORMS, STRAIGHT-LINE WINDS, AND FLOODING	DR-4659-MN	2022	Flood	
ND	SEVERE WINTER STORM AND FLOODING	DR-4660-ND	2022	Severe Storm	
AK	LANDSLIDE	DR-4661-AK	2022	Mud/Landslide	
NE	SEVERE STORMS AND STRAIGHT-LINE WINDS	DR-4662-NE	2022	Severe Storm	
KY	SEVERE STORMS, FLOODING, LANDSLIDES, AND MUDSLIDES	DR-4663-KY	2022	Flood	
SD	SEVERE STORM, STRAIGHT-LINE WINDS, TORNADOES, AND FLOODING	DR-4664-SD	2022	Severe Storm	
MO	SEVERE STORMS AND FLOODING	DR-4665-MO	2022	Flood	
MN	SEVERE STORMS, STRAIGHT-LINE WINDS, TORNADOES, AND FLOODING	DR-4666-MN	2022	Severe Storm	
AK	FLOODING	DR-4667-AK	2022	Flood	
AZ	SEVERE STORMS	DR-4668-AZ	2022	Severe Storm	
AS	HIGH SURF, HIGH WINDS, AND FLOODING	DR-4669-AS	2022	Severe Storm	
OK	SEVERE STORMS, TORNADOES, AND FLOODING	DR-4670-OK	2022	Severe Storm	
PR	HURRICANE FIONA	DR-4671-PR	2022	Hurricane	
AK	SEVERE STORM, FLOODING, AND LANDSLIDES	DR-4672-AK	2022	Severe Storm	
FL	HURRICANE IAN	DR-4673-FL	2022	Hurricane	
VA	FLOODING AND MUDSLIDES	DR-4674-VA	2022	Severe Storm	
FL	HURRICANE IAN - SEMINOLE TRIBE OF FLORIDA	DR-4675-FL	2022	Hurricane	
ND	SEVERE STORMS AND FLOODING	DR-4565-ND	2021	Severe Storm	
DE	TROPICAL STORM ISAIAS	DR-4566-DE	2021	Hurricane	
NY	TROPICAL STORM ISAIAS	DR-4567-NY	2021	Hurricane	
NC	HURRICANE ISAIAS	DR-4568-NC	2021	Hurricane	
CA	WILDFIRES	DR-4569-CA	2021	Fire	
LA	HURRICANE DELTA	DR-4570-LA	2021	Hurricane	
PR	SEVERE STORM AND FLOODING	DR-4571-PR	2021	Flood	
TX	HURRICANE LAURA	DR-4572-TX	2021	Hurricane	
AL	HURRICANE ZETA	DR-4573-AL	2021	Hurricane	
NJ	TROPICAL STORM ISAIAS	DR-4574-NJ	2021	Hurricane	
OK	SEVERE WINTER STORM	DR-4575-OK	2021	Severe Ice Storm	
MS	HURRICANE ZETA	DR-4576-MS	2021	Hurricane	
LA	HURRICANE ZETA	DR-4577-LA	2021	Hurricane	
UT	STRAIGHT-LINE WINDS	DR-4578-UT	2021	Severe Storm	
GA	TROPICAL STORM ZETA	DR-4579-GA	2021	Hurricane	
CT	TROPICAL STORM ISAIAS	DR-4580-CT	2021	Hurricane	
CO	WILDFIRES	DR-4581-CO	2021	Fire	
AZ	COVID-19 PANDEMIC	DR-4582-AZ	2021	Biological	
MD	TROPICAL STORM ISAIAS	DR-4583-MD	2021	Hurricane	
WA	WILDFIRES AND STRAIGHT-LINE WINDS	DR-4584-WA	2021	Fire	
AK	SEVERE STORM, FLOODING, LANDSLIDES, AND MUDSLIDES	DR-4585-AK	2021	Mud/Landslide	
TX	SEVERE WINTER STORMS	DR-4586-TX	2021	Severe Ice Storm	
OK	SEVERE WINTER STORMS	DR-4587-OK	2021	Severe Ice Storm	
NC	TROPICAL STORM ETA	DR-4588-NC	2021	Severe Storm	
ID	STRAIGHT-LINE WINDS	DR-4589-ID	2021	Severe Storm	
LA	SEVERE WINTER STORMS	DR-4590-LA	2021	Severe Ice Storm	
AL	COVID-19 PANDEMIC	DR-4591-AL	2021	Biological	
KY	SEVERE WINTER STORMS, LANDSLIDES, AND MUDSLIDES	DR-4592-KY	2021	Severe Ice Storm	
WA	SEVERE WINTER STORM, STRAIGHT-LINE WINDS, FLOODING, LANDSLIDES, AND MUDSLIDES	DR-4593-WA	2021	Severe Storm	
TN	SEVERE WINTER STORMS	DR-4594-TN	2021	Severe Ice Storm	
KY	SEVERE, STORMS, FLOODING, LANDSLIDES, AND MUDSLIDES	DR-4595-KY	2021	Flood	
AL	SEVERE STORMS, STRAIGHT-LINE WINDS, AND TORNADOES	DR-4596-AL	2021	Severe Storm	
NJ	SEVERE WINTER STORM AND SNOWSTORM	DR-4597-NJ	2021	Snowstorm	
MS	SEVERE WINTER STORMS	DR-4598-MS	2021	Severe Ice Storm	
OR	SEVERE WINTER STORM	DR-4599-OR	2021	Severe Storm	
GA	SEVERE STORMS AND TORNADOES	DR-4600-GA	2021	Severe Storm	
TN	SEVERE STORMS, TORNADOES, AND FLOODING	DR-4601-TN	2021	Tornado	
VA	SEVERE WINTER STORMS	DR-4602-VA	2021	Severe Ice Storm	
WV	SEVERE WINTER STORMS	DR-4603-WV	2021	Severe Ice Storm	
HI	SEVERE STORMS, FLOODING, AND LANDSLIDES	DR-4604-HI	2021	Flood	
WV	SEVERE STORMS AND FLOODING	DR-4605-WV	2021	Flood	
LA	SEVERE STORMS, TORNADOES, AND FLOODING	DR-4606-LA	2021	Flood	
MI	SEVERE STORMS, FLOODING, AND TORNADOES	DR-4607-MI	2021	Severe Storm	
MT	STRAIGHT-LINE WINDS	DR-4608-MT	2021	Other	
TN	SEVERE STORM AND FLOODING	DR-4609-TN	2021	Flood	
CA	WILDFIRES	DR-4610-CA	2021	Fire	
LA	HURRICANE IDA	DR-4611-LA	2021	Hurricane	
MO	SEVERE STORMS, STRAIGHT-LINE WINDS, TORNADOES, AND FLOODING	DR-4612-MO	2021	Severe Storm	
ND	SEVERE STORM, STRAIGHT-LINE WINDS, AND FLOODING	DR-4613-ND	2021	Severe Storm	
NJ	REMNANTS OF HURRICANE IDA	DR-4614-NJ	2021	Hurricane	
NY	REMNANTS OF HURRICANE IDA	DR-4615-NY	2021	Hurricane	
NE	SEVERE STORMS AND STRAIGHT-LINE WINDS	DR-4616-NE	2021	Severe Storm	
NC	REMNANTS OF TROPICAL STORM FRED	DR-4617-NC	2021	Hurricane	
PA	REMNANTS OF HURRICANE IDA	DR-4618-PA	2021	Hurricane	
CA	WILDFIRES	DR-4619-CA	2021	Fire	
AZ	SEVERE STORMS AND FLOODING	DR-4620-AZ	2021	Flood	
VT	SEVERE STORM AND FLOODING	DR-4621-VT	2021	Flood	
NH	SEVERE STORM AND FLOODING	DR-4622-NH	2021	Severe Storm	
MT	RICHARD SPRING FIRE	DR-4623-MT	2021	Fire	
NC	HURRICANE DORIAN	DR-4465-NC	2020	Hurricane	
TX	TROPICAL STORM IMELDA	DR-4466-TX	2020	Flood	
SD	SEVERE STORMS, TORNADOES, AND FLOODING	DR-4467-SD	2020	Severe Storm	
FL	HURRICANE DORIAN	DR-4468-FL	2020	Hurricane	
SD	SEVERE STORMS, TORNADOES, AND FLOODING	DR-4469-SD	2020	Severe Storm	
MS	SEVERE STORM, STRAIGHT-LINE WINDS, AND FLOODING	DR-4470-MS	2020	Severe Storm	
TN	SEVERE STORM AND STRAIGHT-LINE WINDS	DR-4471-TN	2020	Severe Storm	
NY	SEVERE STORMS, STRAIGHT-LINE WINDS, AND FLOODING	DR-4472-NY	2020	Severe Storm	
PR	EARTHQUAKES	DR-4473-PR	2020	Earthquake	
VT	SEVERE STORM AND FLOODING	DR-4474-VT	2020	Severe Storm	
ND	FLOODING	DR-4475-ND	2020	Flood	
TN	SEVERE STORMS, TORNADOES, STRAIGHT-LINE WINDS, AND FLOODING	DR-4476-TN	2020	Tornado	
WI	SEVERE WINTER STORM AND FLOODING	DR-4477-WI	2020	Flood	
MS	SEVERE STORMS, TORNADOES, STRAIGHT-LINE WINDS, AND FLOODING	DR-4478-MS	2020	Severe Storm	
SC	SEVERE STORMS, TORNADOES, STRAIGHT-LINE WINDS, AND FLOODING	DR-4479-SC	2020	Severe Storm	
NY	COVID-19 PANDEMIC	DR-4480-NY	2020	Biological	
WA	COVID-19 PANDEMIC	DR-4481-WA	2020	Biological	
CA	COVID-19 PANDEMIC	DR-4482-CA	2020	Biological	
IA	COVID-19 PANDEMIC	DR-4483-IA	2020	Biological	
LA	COVID-19 PANDEMIC	DR-4484-LA	2020	Biological	
TX	COVID-19 PANDEMIC	DR-4485-TX	2020	Biological	
FL	COVID-19 PANDEMIC	DR-4486-FL	2020	Biological	
NC	COVID-19 PANDEMIC	DR-4487-NC	2020	Biological	
NJ	COVID-19 PANDEMIC	DR-4488-NJ	2020	Biological	
IL	COVID-19 PANDEMIC	DR-4489-IL	2020	Biological	
MO	COVID-19 PANDEMIC	DR-4490-MO	2020	Biological	
MD	COVID-19 PANDEMIC	DR-4491-MD	2020	Biological	
SC	COVID-19 PANDEMIC	DR-4492-SC	2020	Biological	
PR	COVID-19 PANDEMIC	DR-4493-PR	2020	Biological	
MI	COVID-19 PANDEMIC	DR-4494-MI	2020	Biological	
GU	COVID-19 PANDEMIC	DR-4495-GU	2020	Biological	
MA	COVID-19 PANDEMIC	DR-4496-MA	2020	Biological	
KY	COVID-19 PANDEMIC	DR-4497-KY	2020	Biological	
CO	COVID-19 PANDEMIC	DR-4498-CO	2020	Biological	
OR	COVID-19 PANDEMIC	DR-4499-OR	2020	Biological	
CT	COVID-19 PANDEMIC	DR-4500-CT	2020	Biological	
GA	COVID-19 PANDEMIC	DR-4501-GA	2020	Biological	
DC	COVID-19 PANDEMIC	DR-4502-DC	2020	Biological	
AL	COVID-19 PANDEMIC	DR-4503-AL	2020	Biological	
KS	COVID-19 PANDEMIC	DR-4504-KS	2020	Biological	
RI	COVID-19 PANDEMIC	DR-4505-RI	2020	Biological	
PA	COVID-19 PANDEMIC	DR-4506-PA	2020	Biological	
OH	COVID-19 PANDEMIC	DR-4507-OH	2020	Biological	
MT	COVID-19 PANDEMIC	DR-4508-MT	2020	Biological	
ND	COVID-19 PANDEMIC	DR-4509-ND	2020	Biological	
HI	COVID-19 PANDEMIC	DR-4510-HI	2020	Biological	
MP	COVID-19 PANDEMIC	DR-4511-MP	2020	Biological	
VA	COVID-19 PANDEMIC	DR-4512-VA	2020	Biological	
VI	COVID-19 PANDEMIC	DR-4513-VI	2020	Biological	
TN	COVID-19 PANDEMIC	DR-4514-TN	2020	Biological	
IN	COVID-19 PANDEMIC	DR-4515-IN	2020	Biological	
NH	COVID-19 PANDEMIC	DR-4516-NH	2020	Biological	
WV	COVID-19 PANDEMIC	DR-4517-WV	2020	Biological	
AR	COVID-19 PANDEMIC	DR-4518-AR	2020	Biological	
OR	SEVERE STORMS, FLOODING, LANDSLIDES, AND MUDSLIDES	DR-4519-OR	2020	Flood	
WI	COVID-19 PANDEMIC	DR-4520-WI	2020	Biological	
NE	COVID-19 PANDEMIC	DR-4521-NE	2020	Biological	
ME	COVID-19 PANDEMIC	DR-4522-ME	2020	Biological	
NV	COVID-19 PANDEMIC	DR-4523-NV	2020	Biological	
AZ	COVID-19 PANDEMIC	DR-4524-AZ	2020	Biological	
UT	COVID-19 PANDEMIC	DR-4525-UT	2020	Biological	
DE	COVID-19 PANDEMIC	DR-4526-DE	2020	Biological	
SD	COVID-19 PANDEMIC	DR-4527-SD	2020	Biological	
MS	COVID-19 PANDEMIC	DR-4528-MS	2020	Biological	
NM	COVID-19 PANDEMIC	DR-4529-NM	2020	Biological	
OK	COVID-19 PANDEMIC	DR-4530-OK	2020	Biological	
MN	COVID-19 PANDEMIC	DR-4531-MN	2020	Biological	
VT	COVID-19 PANDEMIC	DR-4532-VT	2020	Biological	
AK	COVID-19 PANDEMIC	DR-4533-AK	2020	Biological	
ID	COVID-19 PANDEMIC	DR-4534-ID	2020	Biological	
WY	COVID-19 PANDEMIC	DR-4535-WY	2020	Biological	
MS	SEVERE STORMS, TORNADOES, STRAIGHT-LINE WINDS, AND FLOODING	DR-4536-MS	2020	Severe Storm	
AS	COVID-19 PANDEMIC	DR-4537-AS	2020	Biological	
MS	SEVERE STORMS, FLOODING, AND MUDSLIDES	DR-4538-MS	2020	Severe Storm	
WA	SEVERE STORMS, FLOODING, LANDSLIDES, AND MUDSLIDES	DR-4539-WA	2020	Flood	
KY	SEVERE STORMS, FLOODING, LANDSLIDES, AND MUDSLIDES	DR-4540-KY	2020	Severe Storm	
TN	SEVERE STORMS, TORNADOES, STRAIGHT-LINE WINDS, AND FLOODING	DR-4541-TN	2020	Severe Storm	
SC	SEVERE STORMS, TORNADOES, AND STRAIGHT-LINE WINDS	DR-4542-SC	2020	Severe Storm	
NC	SEVERE STORMS, TORNADOES, AND FLOODING	DR-4543-NC	2020	Severe Storm	
AR	SEVERE STORMS, TORNADOES, AND STRAIGHT-LINE WINDS	DR-4544-AR	2020	Tornado	
FL	COVID-19 PANDEMIC	DR-4545-FL	2020	Biological	
AL	SEVERE STORMS AND FLOODING	DR-4546-AL	2020	Severe Storm	
MI	SEVERE STORMS AND FLOODING	DR-4547-MI	2020	Dam/Levee Break	
UT	EARTHQUAKE AND AFTERSHOCKS	DR-4548-UT	2020	Earthquake	
HI	SEVERE STORMS AND FLOODING	DR-4549-HI	2020	Severe Storm	
TN	SEVERE STORMS, STRAIGHT-LINE WINDS, AND FLOODING	DR-4550-TN	2020	Severe Storm	
MS	SEVERE STORMS, TORNADOES, STRAIGHT-LINE WINDS, AND FLOODING	DR-4551-MS	2020	Severe Storm	
MO	SEVERE STORMS, TORNADOES, STRAIGHT-LINE WINDS, AND FLOODING	DR-4552-MO	2020	Severe Storm	
ND	FLOODING	DR-4553-ND	2020	Flood	
AL	SEVERE STORMS, STRAIGHT-LINE WINDS, AND TORNADOES	DR-4554-AL	2020	Severe Storm	
AL	SEVERE THUNDERSTORMS	DR-4555-AL	2020	Severe Storm	
AR	SEVERE STORMS AND STRAIGHT-LINE WINDS	DR-4556-AR	2020	Tornado	
IA	SEVERE STORMS	DR-4557-IA	2020	Severe Storm	
CA	WILDFIRES	DR-4558-CA	2020	Fire	
LA	HURRICANE LAURA	DR-4559-LA	2020	Hurricane	
PR	HURRICANE ISAIAS	DR-4560-PR	2020	Hurricane	
IA	SEVERE STORMS AND STRAIGHT-LINE WINDS	DR-4561-IA	2020	Severe Storm	
OR	WILDFIRES AND STRAIGHT-LINE WINDS	DR-4562-OR	2020	Fire	
AL	HURRICANE SALLY	DR-4563-AL	2020	Hurricane	
FL	HURRICANE SALLY	DR-4564-FL	2020	Hurricane	

=== 2010 - 2021 ===
State	Name	FEMA disaster code	Year declared	Disaster type	Notes
NY	SEVERE STORMS AND FLOODING	DR-4397-NY	2019	Flood	
GU	TYPHOON MANGKHUT	DR-4398-GU	2019	Typhoon	
FL	HURRICANE MICHAEL	DR-4399-FL	2019	Hurricane	
GA	HURRICANE MICHAEL	DR-4400-GA	2019	Hurricane	
VA	HURRICANE FLORENCE	DR-4401-VA	2019	Hurricane	
WI	SEVERE STORMS, TORNADOES, STRAIGHT-LINE WINDS, FLOODING, AND LANDSLIDES	DR-4402-WI	2019	Flood	
KS	SEVERE STORMS, STRAIGHT-LINE WINDS, AND FLOODING	DR-4403-KS	2019	Severe Storm	
MP	SUPER TYPHOON YUTU	DR-4404-MP	2019	Typhoon	
MT	FLOODING	DR-4405-MT	2019	Flood	
AL	HURRICANE MICHAEL	DR-4406-AL	2019	Hurricane	
CA	WILDFIRES	DR-4407-CA	2019	Fire	
PA	SEVERE STORMS AND FLOODING	DR-4408-PA	2019	Severe Storm	
AZ	SEVERE STORMS AND FLOODING	DR-4409-AZ	2019	Severe Storm	
CT	SEVERE STORMS AND FLOODING	DR-4410-CT	2019	Severe Storm	
VA	TROPICAL STORM MICHAEL	DR-4411-VA	2019	Hurricane	
NC	TROPICAL STORM MICHAEL	DR-4412-NC	2019	Hurricane	
AK	EARTHQUAKE	DR-4413-AK	2019	Earthquake	
MN	SEVERE STORMS AND FLOODING	DR-4414-MN	2019	Flood	
MS	SEVERE STORMS, FLOODING, AND TORNADO	DR-4415-MS	2019	Severe Storm	
TX	SEVERE STORMS AND FLOODING	DR-4416-TX	2019	Flood	
KS	SEVERE STORMS, STRAIGHT-LINE WINDS, AND FLOODING	DR-4417-KS	2019	Severe Storm	
WA	SEVERE WINTER STORMS, STRAIGHT-LINE WINDS, FLOODING, LANDSLIDES, MUDSLIDES, TORNADO	DR-4418-WA	2019	Severe Storm	
AL	SEVERE STORMS, STRAIGHT-LINE WINDS, AND TORNADOES	DR-4419-AL	2019	Tornado	
NE	SEVERE WINTER STORM, STRAIGHT-LINE WINDS, AND FLOODING	DR-4420-NE	2019	Flood	
IA	SEVERE STORMS AND FLOODING	DR-4421-IA	2019	Flood	
CA	SEVERE STORMS, FLOODING, LANDSLIDES, AND MUDSLIDES	DR-4422-CA	2019	Severe Storm	
CA	SEVERE STORMS AND FLOODING	DR-4423-CA	2019	Severe Storm	
OH	SEVERE STORMS, FLOODING, AND LANDSLIDES	DR-4424-OH	2019	Flood	
CA	SEVERE STORMS AND FLOODING	DR-4425-CA	2019	Severe Storm	
AL	SEVERE STORMS, STRAIGHT-LINE WINDS, TORNADOES, AND FLOODING	DR-4426-AL	2019	Severe Storm	
TN	SEVERE STORMS, FLOODING, LANDSLIDES, AND MUDSLIDES	DR-4427-TN	2019	Flood	
KY	SEVERE STORMS, STRAIGHT-LINE WINDS, FLOODING, LANDSLIDES, AND MUDSLIDES	DR-4428-KY	2019	Severe Storm	
MS	SEVERE STORMS, STRAIGHT-LINE WINDS, TORNADOES, AND FLOODING	DR-4429-MS	2019	Severe Storm	
IA	SEVERE STORMS AND FLOODING	DR-4430-IA	2019	Flood	
CA	SEVERE WINTER STORMS, FLOODING, LANDSLIDES, AND MUDSLIDES	DR-4431-CA	2019	Severe Storm	
OR	SEVERE WINTER STORMS, FLOODING, LANDSLIDES, AND MUDSLIDES	DR-4432-OR	2019	Severe Storm	
GU	TYPHOON WUTIP	DR-4433-GU	2019	Typhoon	
CA	SEVERE WINTER STORMS, FLOODING, LANDSLIDES, AND MUDSLIDES	DR-4434-CA	2019	Severe Storm	
MO	SEVERE STORMS, STRAIGHT-LINE WINDS, AND FLOODING	DR-4435-MO	2019	Flood	
AZ	SNOWSTORM AND FLOODING	DR-4436-AZ	2019	Severe Storm	
MT	FLOODING	DR-4437-MT	2019	Flood	
OK	SEVERE STORMS, STRAIGHT-LINE WINDS, TORNADOES, AND FLOODING	DR-4438-OK	2019	Severe Storm	
LA	SEVERE STORMS AND TORNADOES	DR-4439-LA	2019	Severe Storm	
SD	SEVERE WINTER STORM, SNOWSTORM, AND FLOODING	DR-4440-SD	2019	Flood	
AR	SEVERE STORMS AND FLOODING	DR-4441-AR	2019	Flood	
MN	SEVERE WINTER STORM, STRAIGHT-LINE WINDS, AND FLOODING	DR-4442-MN	2019	Flood	
ID	SEVERE STORMS, FLOODING, LANDSLIDES, AND MUDSLIDES	DR-4443-ID	2019	Flood	
ND	FLOODING	DR-4444-ND	2019	Flood	
VT	SEVERE STORMS AND FLOODING	DR-4445-VT	2019	Flood	
NE	SEVERE STORMS AND FLOODING	DR-4446-NE	2019	Flood	
OH	SEVERE STORMS, STRAIGHT-LINE WINDS, TORNADOES, FLOODING, LANDSLIDES, AND MUDSLIDE	DR-4447-OH	2019	Tornado	
SD	SEVERE WINTER STORM, SNOWSTORM, AND FLOODING	DR-4448-SD	2019	Severe Storm	
KS	SEVERE STORMS, STRAIGHT-LINE WINDS, TORNADOES, FLOODING,LANDSLIDES,AND MUDSLIDES	DR-4449-KS	2019	Severe Storm	
MS	SEVERE STORMS, TORNADOES, STRAIGHT-LINE WINDS, AND FLOODING	DR-4450-MS	2019	Severe Storm	
MO	SEVERE STORMS, TORNADOES, AND FLOODING	DR-4451-MO	2019	Severe Storm	
OR	SEVERE STORMS, FLOODING, LANDSLIDES, AND MUDSLIDES	DR-4452-OR	2019	Flood	
OK	SEVERE STORMS, TORNADOES, STRAIGHT-LINE WINDS, AND FLOODING	DR-4453-OK	2019	Severe Storm	
TX	SEVERE STORMS AND FLOODING	DR-4454-TX	2019	Flood	
WV	SEVERE STORMS, FLOODING, LANDSLIDES, AND MUDSLIDES	DR-4455-WV	2019	Flood	
OK	SEVERE STORMS, STRAIGHT-LINE WINDS, TORNADOES, AND FLOODING	DR-4456-OK	2019	Severe Storm	
NH	SEVERE STORM AND FLOODING	DR-4457-NH	2019	Severe Storm	
LA	HURRICANE BARRY	DR-4458-LA	2019	Hurricane	
WI	SEVERE STORMS, TORNADOES, STRAIGHT-LINE WINDS, AND FLOODING	DR-4459-WI	2019	Flood	
AR	SEVERE STORMS, STRAIGHT-LINE WINDS, TORNADOES, AND FLOODING	DR-4460-AR	2019	Flood	
IL	SEVERE STORMS AND FLOODING	DR-4461-IL	2019	Flood	
LA	FLOODING	DR-4462-LA	2019	Flood	
SD	SEVERE STORMS AND FLOODING	DR-4463-SD	2019	Flood	
SC	HURRICANE DORIAN	DR-4464-SC	2019	Hurricane	
ID	FLOODING	DR-4342-ID	2018	Flood	
WI	SEVERE STORMS, STRAIGHT-LINE WINDS, FLOODING, LANDSLIDES, AND MUD	DR-4343-WI	2018	Severe Storm	
CA	WILDFIRES	DR-4344-CA	2018	Fire	
LA	TROPICAL STORM HARVEY	DR-4345-LA	2018	Hurricane	
SC	HURRICANE IRMA	DR-4346-SC	2018	Hurricane	
KS	SEVERE STORMS, STRAIGHT-LINE WINDS, AND FLOODING	DR-4347-KS	2018	Severe Storm	
NY	FLOODING	DR-4348-NY	2018	Flood	
AL	HURRICANE NATE	DR-4349-AL	2018	Hurricane	
MS	HURRICANE NATE	DR-4350-MS	2018	Hurricane	
AK	SEVERE STORM	DR-4351-AK	2018	Severe Storm	
NM	SEVERE STORMS AND FLOODING	DR-4352-NM	2018	Flood	
CA	WILDFIRES, FLOODING, MUDFLOWS, AND DEBRIS FLOWS	DR-4353-CA	2018	Fire	
ME	SEVERE STORM AND FLOODING	DR-4354-ME	2018	Severe Storm	
NH	SEVERE STORM AND FLOODING	DR-4355-NH	2018	Severe Storm	
VT	SEVERE STORM AND FLOODING	DR-4356-VT	2018	Severe Storm	
AS	TROPICAL STORM GITA	DR-4357-AS	2018	Hurricane	
KY	SEVERE STORMS, FLOODING, LANDSLIDES, AND MUDSLIDES	DR-4358-KY	2018	Flood	
WV	SEVERE STORMS, FLOODING, LANDSLIDES, AND MUDSLIDES	DR-4359-WV	2018	Mud/Landslide	
OH	SEVERE STORMS, LANDSLIDES, AND MUDSLIDES	DR-4360-OH	2018	Flood	
KY	SEVERE STORMS, TORNADOES, FLOODING, LANDSLIDES, AND MUDSLIDES	DR-4361-KY	2018	Flood	
AL	SEVERE STORMS AND TORNADOES	DR-4362-AL	2018	Severe Storm	
IN	SEVERE STORMS AND FLOODING	DR-4363-IN	2018	Flood	
NC	TORNADO AND SEVERE STORMS	DR-4364-NC	2018	Severe Storm	
HI	SEVERE STORMS, FLOODING, LANDSLIDES, AND MUDSLIDES	DR-4365-HI	2018	Flood	
HI	KILAUEA VOLCANIC ERUPTION AND EARTHQUAKES	DR-4366-HI	2018	Volcanic Eruption	
ME	SEVERE STORM AND FLOODING	DR-4367-ME	2018	Coastal Storm	
NJ	SEVERE WINTER STORM AND SNOWSTORM	DR-4368-NJ	2018	Severe Storm	
AK	SEVERE STORM	DR-4369-AK	2018	Coastal Storm	
NH	SEVERE STORM AND FLOODING	DR-4370-NH	2018	Coastal Storm	
NH	SEVERE WINTER STORM AND SNOWSTORM	DR-4371-NH	2018	Snowstorm	
MA	SEVERE WINTER STORM AND FLOODING	DR-4372-MA	2018	Severe Storm	
OK	WILDFIRES	DR-4373-OK	2018	Fire	
MD	SEVERE STORMS AND FLOODING	DR-4374-MD	2018	Severe Storm	
NE	SEVERE WINTER STORM AND STRAIGHT-LINE WINDS	DR-4375-NE	2018	Snowstorm	
MD	SEVERE STORM AND FLOODING	DR-4376-MD	2018	Flood	
TX	SEVERE STORMS AND FLOODING	DR-4377-TX	2018	Flood	
WV	SEVERE STORMS, FLOODING, LANDSLIDES, AND MUDSLIDES	DR-4378-WV	2018	Severe Storm	
MA	SEVERE WINTER STORM AND SNOWSTORM	DR-4379-MA	2018	Snowstorm	
VT	SEVERE STORM AND FLOODING	DR-4380-VT	2018	Severe Storm	
MI	SEVERE STORMS, FLOODING, LANDSLIDES, AND MUDSLIDES	DR-4381-MI	2018	Flood	
CA	WILDFIRES AND HIGH WINDS	DR-4382-CA	2018	Fire	
WI	SEVERE STORMS, STRAIGHT-LINE WINDS, AND FLOODING	DR-4383-WI	2018	Flood	
WA	FLOODING	DR-4384-WA	2018	Flood	
CT	SEVERE STORMS, TORNADOES, AND STRAIGHT-LINE WINDS	DR-4385-CT	2018	Tornado	
IA	SEVERE STORMS, TORNADOES, STRAIGHT-LINE WINDS, AND FLOODING	DR-4386-IA	2018	Severe Storm	
NE	SEVERE STORMS, TORNADOES, STRAIGHT-LINE WINDS, AND FLOODING	DR-4387-NE	2018	Severe Storm	
MT	FLOODING	DR-4388-MT	2018	Flood	
AZ	SEVERE STORMS, FLOODING, AND LANDSLIDES	DR-4389-AZ	2018	Flood	
MN	SEVERE STORMS, TORNADOES, STRAIGHT-LINE WINDS, AND FLOODING	DR-4390-MN	2018	Flood	
AK	FLOODING	DR-4391-AK	2018	Flood	
IA	SEVERE STORM AND TORNADOES	DR-4392-IA	2018	Severe Storm	
NC	HURRICANE FLORENCE	DR-4393-NC	2018	Hurricane	
SC	HURRICANE FLORENCE	DR-4394-SC	2018	Hurricane	
HI	HURRICANE LANE	DR-4395-HI	2018	Hurricane	
MP	TYPHOON MANGKHUT	DR-4396-MP	2018	Typhoon	
HI	SEVERE STORMS, FLOODING, LANDSLIDES, AND MUDSLIDES	DR-4282-HI	2017	Mud/Landslide	
FL	HURRICANE MATTHEW	DR-4283-FL	2017	Hurricane	
GA	HURRICANE MATTHEW	DR-4284-GA	2017	Hurricane	
NC	HURRICANE MATTHEW	DR-4285-NC	2017	Hurricane	
SC	HURRICANE MATTHEW	DR-4286-SC	2017	Hurricane	
KS	SEVERE STORMS AND FLOODING	DR-4287-KS	2017	Severe Storm	
WI	SEVERE STORMS, FLOODING, AND MUDSLIDES	DR-4288-WI	2017	Flood	
IA	SEVERE STORMS AND FLOODING	DR-4289-IA	2017	Flood	
MN	SEVERE STORMS AND FLOODING	DR-4290-MN	2017	Flood	
VA	HURRICANE MATTHEW	DR-4291-VA	2017	Hurricane	
PA	SEVERE STORMS AND FLOODING	DR-4292-PA	2017	Flood	
TN	WILDFIRES	DR-4293-TN	2017	Fire	
GA	SEVERE STORMS, TORNADOES, AND STRAIGHT-LINE WINDS	DR-4294-GA	2017	Severe Storm	
MS	SEVERE STORMS, TORNADOES, STRAIGHT-LINE WINDS, AND FLOODING	DR-4295-MS	2017	Tornado	
OR	SEVERE WINTER STORM AND FLOODING	DR-4296-OR	2017	Severe Storm	
GA	SEVERE STORMS, TORNADOES, STRAIGHT-LINE WINDS, AND FLOODING	DR-4297-GA	2017	Tornado	
SD	SEVERE WINTER STORM	DR-4298-SD	2017	Severe Storm	
OK	SEVERE WINTER STORM	DR-4299-OK	2017	Severe Storm	
LA	SEVERE STORMS, TORNADOES, AND STRAIGHT-LINE WINDS	DR-4300-LA	2017	Tornado	
CA	SEVERE WINTER STORMS, FLOODING, AND MUDSLIDES	DR-4301-CA	2017	Severe Storm	
CA	SEVERE WINTER STORM	DR-4302-CA	2017	Severe Storm	
NV	SEVERE WINTER STORMS, FLOODING, AND MUDSLIDES	DR-4303-NV	2017	Severe Storm	
KS	SEVERE WINTER STORM	DR-4304-KS	2017	Severe Ice Storm	
CA	SEVERE WINTER STORMS, FLOODING, AND MUDSLIDES	DR-4305-CA	2017	Flood	
WY	SEVERE WINTER STORM AND STRAIGHT-LINE WINDS	DR-4306-WY	2017	Severe Storm	
NV	SEVERE WINTER STORMS, FLOODING, AND MUDSLIDES	DR-4307-NV	2017	Severe Storm	
CA	SEVERE WINTER STORMS, FLOODING, AND MUDSLIDES	DR-4308-CA	2017	Flood	
WA	SEVERE WINTER STORMS, FLOODING, LANDSLIDES, MUDSLIDES	DR-4309-WA	2017	Flood	
ID	SEVERE WINTER STORMS AND FLOODING	DR-4310-ID	2017	Flood	
UT	SEVERE WINTER STORMS AND FLOODING	DR-4311-UT	2017	Flood	
CA	FLOODING	DR-4312-CA	2017	Severe Storm	
ID	SEVERE STORMS, FLOODING, LANDSLIDES, AND MUDSLIDES	DR-4313-ID	2017	Flood	
MS	SEVERE STORMS, TORNADOES, STRAIGHT-LINE WINDS, AND FLOODING	DR-4314-MS	2017	Severe Storm	
OK	SEVERE STORMS, TORNADOES, AND FLOODING	DR-4315-OK	2017	Severe Storm	
NH	SEVERE WINTER STORM	DR-4316-NH	2017	Severe Storm	
MO	SEVERE STORMS, TORNADOES, STRAIGHT-LINE WINDS AND FLOODING	DR-4317-MO	2017	Flood	
AR	SEVERE STORMS, TORNADOES, STRAIGHT-LINE WINDS, AND FLOODING	DR-4318-AR	2017	Severe Storm	
KS	SEVERE WINTER STORM, SNOWSTORM, STRAIGHT-LINE WINDS, AND FLOODING	DR-4319-KS	2017	Snowstorm	
TN	SEVERE STORMS, STRAIGHT-LINE WINDS, AND FLOODING	DR-4320-TN	2017	Severe Storm	
NE	SEVERE WINTER STORM AND STRAIGHT-LINE WINDS	DR-4321-NE	2017	Severe Storm	
NY	SEVERE WINTER STORM AND SNOWSTORM	DR-4322-NY	2017	Snowstorm	
ND	FLOODING	DR-4323-ND	2017	Flood	
OK	SEVERE STORMS, TORNADOES, STRAIGHT-LINE WINDS, AND FLOODING	DR-4324-OK	2017	Tornado	
NE	SEVERE STORMS, TORNADOES, AND STRAIGHT-LINE WINDS	DR-4325-NE	2017	Severe Storm	
MI	SEVERE STORMS AND FLOODING	DR-4326-MI	2017	Severe Storm	
WY	FLOODING	DR-4327-WY	2017	Flood	
OR	SEVERE WINTER STORMS, FLOODING, LANDSLIDES, AND MUDSLIDES	DR-4328-OR	2017	Severe Storm	
NH	SEVERE STORMS AND FLOODING	DR-4329-NH	2017	Severe Storm	
VT	SEVERE STORMS AND FLOODING	DR-4330-VT	2017	Severe Storm	
WV	SEVERE STORMS, FLOODING, LANDSLIDES, AND MUDSLIDES	DR-4331-WV	2017	Severe Storm	
TX	HURRICANE HARVEY	DR-4332-TX	2017	Hurricane	
ID	FLOODING, LANDSLIDES, AND MUDSLIDES	DR-4333-ID	2017	Flood	
IA	SEVERE STORMS, TORNADOES, STRAIGHT-LINE WINDS, AND FLOODING	DR-4334-IA	2017	Severe Storm	
VI	HURRICANE IRMA	DR-4335-VI	2017	Hurricane	
PR	HURRICANE IRMA	DR-4336-PR	2017	Hurricane	
FL	HURRICANE IRMA	DR-4337-FL	2017	Hurricane	
GA	HURRICANE IRMA	DR-4338-GA	2017	Hurricane	
PR	HURRICANE MARIA	DR-4339-PR	2017	Hurricane	
VI	HURRICANE MARIA	DR-4340-VI	2017	Hurricane	
FL	HURRICANE IRMA - SEMINOLE TRIBE OF FLORIDA	DR-4341-FL	2017	Hurricane	
SC	SEVERE STORMS AND FLOODING	DR-4241-SC	2016	Flood	
WA	SEVERE WINDSTORM	DR-4242-WA	2016	Severe Storm	
WA	WILDFIRES AND MUDSLIDES	DR-4243-WA	2016	Fire	
AK	SEVERE STORM	DR-4244-AK	2016	Coastal Storm	
TX	SEVERE STORMS, TORNADOES, STRAIGHT-LINE WINDS, AND FLOODING	DR-4245-TX	2016	Severe Storm	
ID	SEVERE STORM AND STRAIGHT-LINE WIND	DR-4246-ID	2016	Severe Storm	
OK	SEVERE WINTER STORMS AND FLOODING	DR-4247-OK	2016	Severe Ice Storm	
MS	SEVERE STORMS, TORNADOES, STRAIGHT-LINE WINDS, AND FLOODING	DR-4248-MS	2016	Severe Storm	
WA	SEVERE STORMS, STRAIGHT-LINE WINDS, FLOODING, LANDSLIDES, AND MUDSLIDES	DR-4249-WA	2016	Severe Storm	
MO	SEVERE STORMS, TORNADOES, STRAIGHT-LINE WINDS, AND FLOODING	DR-4250-MO	2016	Flood	
AL	SEVERE STORMS, TORNADOES, STRAIGHT-LINE WINDS, AND FLOODING	DR-4251-AL	2016	Severe Storm	
ID	SEVERE WINTER STORMS	DR-4252-ID	2016	Severe Storm	
WA	SEVERE WINTER STORM, STRAIGHT-LINE WINDS, FLOODING, LANDSLIDES, MUDSLIDES, AND A T	DR-4253-WA	2016	Flood	
AR	SEVERE STORMS, TORNADOES, STRAIGHT-LINE WINDS, AND FLOODING	DR-4254-AR	2016	Severe Storm	
TX	SEVERE WINTER STORMS, TORNADOES, STRAIGHT-LINE WINDS, AND FLOODING	DR-4255-TX	2016	Severe Storm	
OK	SEVERE WINTER STORMS AND FLOODING	DR-4256-OK	2016	Severe Storm	
AK	SEVERE STORM	DR-4257-AK	2016	Severe Storm	
OR	SEVERE WINTER STORMS, STRAIGHT-LINE WINDS, FLOODING, LANDSLIDES, AND MUDSLIDES	DR-4258-OR	2016	Severe Storm	
GA	SEVERE STORMS AND FLOODING	DR-4259-GA	2016	Severe Storm	
DC	SNOWSTORM	DR-4260-DC	2016	Snowstorm	
MD	SEVERE WINTER STORM AND SNOWSTORM	DR-4261-MD	2016	Snowstorm	
VA	SEVERE WINTER STORM AND SNOWSTORM	DR-4262-VA	2016	Snowstorm	
LA	SEVERE STORMS AND FLOODING	DR-4263-LA	2016	Flood	
NJ	SEVERE WINTER STORM AND SNOWSTORM	DR-4264-NJ	2016	Severe Storm	
DE	SEVERE WINTER STORM AND SNOWSTORM	DR-4265-DE	2016	Snowstorm	
TX	SEVERE STORMS, TORNADOES, AND FLOODING	DR-4266-TX	2016	Flood	
PA	SEVERE WINTER STORM AND SNOWSTORM	DR-4267-PA	2016	Snowstorm	
MS	SEVERE STORMS AND FLOODING	DR-4268-MS	2016	Flood	
TX	SEVERE STORMS AND FLOODING	DR-4269-TX	2016	Flood	
AR	SEVERE STORMS, TORNADOES, STRAIGHT-LINE WINDS, AND FLOODING	DR-4270-AR	2016	Severe Storm	
MT	SEVERE WINTER STORM AND STRAIGHT-LINE WINDS	DR-4271-MT	2016	Severe Storm	
TX	SEVERE STORMS AND FLOODING	DR-4272-TX	2016	Flood	
WV	SEVERE STORMS, FLOODING, LANDSLIDES, AND MUDSLIDES	DR-4273-WV	2016	Flood	
OK	SEVERE STORMS AND FLOODING	DR-4274-OK	2016	Flood	
MT	TORNADO	DR-4275-MT	2016	Tornado	
WI	SEVERE STORMS AND FLOODING	DR-4276-WI	2016	Severe Storm	
LA	SEVERE STORMS AND FLOODING	DR-4277-LA	2016	Flood	
KY	SEVERE STORM, TORNADOES, FLOODING, LANDSLIDES, AND MUDSLIDES	DR-4278-KY	2016	Severe Storm	
MD	SEVERE STORM AND FLOODING	DR-4279-MD	2016	Flood	
FL	HURRICANE HERMINE	DR-4280-FL	2016	Hurricane	
IA	SEVERE STORMS, STRAIGHT-LINE WINDS, AND FLOODING	DR-4281-IA	2016	Flood	
NM	SEVERE STORMS AND FLOODING	DR-4197-NM	2015	Severe Storm	
MT	SEVERE STORMS, STRAIGHT-LINE WINDS, AND FLOODING	DR-4198-MT	2015	Severe Storm	
NM	SEVERE STORMS AND FLOODING	DR-4199-NM	2015	Severe Storm	
MO	SEVERE STORMS, TORNADOES, STRAIGHT-LINE WINDS, AND FLOODING	DR-4200-MO	2015	Severe Storm	
HI	PU'U O'O VOLCANIC ERUPTION AND LAVA FLOW	DR-4201-HI	2015	Volcanic Eruption	
NV	SEVERE STORMS AND FLOODING	DR-4202-NV	2015	Flood	
AZ	SEVERE STORMS AND FLOODING	DR-4203-AZ	2015	Flood	
NY	SEVERE WINTER STORM, SNOWSTORM, AND FLOODING	DR-4204-NY	2015	Snowstorm	
MS	SEVERE STORMS AND TORNADOES	DR-4205-MS	2015	Tornado	
CA	SEVERE STORMS, FLOODING, AND MUDSLIDES	DR-4206-CA	2015	Flood	
VT	SEVERE WINTER STORM	DR-4207-VT	2015	Severe Storm	
ME	SEVERE WINTER STORM, SNOWSTORM, AND FLOODING	DR-4208-ME	2015	Snowstorm	
NH	SEVERE WINTER STORM AND SNOWSTORM	DR-4209-NH	2015	Severe Storm	
WV	SEVERE WINTER STORM, FLOODING, LANDSLIDES, AND MUDSLIDES	DR-4210-WV	2015	Severe Storm	
TN	SEVERE WINTER STORM AND FLOODING	DR-4211-TN	2015	Severe Ice Storm	
RI	SEVERE WINTER STORM AND SNOWSTORM	DR-4212-RI	2015	Severe Storm	
CT	SEVERE WINTER STORM AND SNOWSTORM	DR-4213-CT	2015	Severe Storm	
MA	SEVERE WINTER STORM, SNOWSTORM, AND FLOODING	DR-4214-MA	2015	Severe Storm	
GA	SEVERE WINTER STORM	DR-4215-GA	2015	Severe Ice Storm	
KY	SEVERE WINTER STORMS, SNOWSTORMS, FLOODING, LANDSLIDES, AND MUDSLIDES	DR-4216-KY	2015	Snowstorm	
KY	SEVERE STORMS, TORNADOES, FLOODING, LANDSLIDES, AND MUDSLIDES	DR-4217-KY	2015	Flood	
KY	SEVERE WINTER STORM, SNOWSTORM, FLOODING, LANDSLIDES, AND MUDSLIDES	DR-4218-KY	2015	Flood	
WV	SEVERE STORMS, FLOODING, LANDSLIDES, AND MUDSLIDES	DR-4219-WV	2015	Severe Storm	
WV	SEVERE STORMS, FLOODING, LANDSLIDES, AND MUDSLIDES	DR-4220-WV	2015	Flood	
WV	SEVERE STORMS, FLOODING, LANDSLIDES, AND MUDSLIDES	DR-4221-WV	2015	Flood	
OK	SEVERE STORMS, TORNADOES, STRAIGHT-LINE WINDS, AND FLOODING	DR-4222-OK	2015	Severe Storm	
TX	SEVERE STORMS, TORNADOES, STRAIGHT-LINE WINDS AND FLOODING	DR-4223-TX	2015	Severe Storm	
GU	TYPHOON DOLPHIN	DR-4224-GU	2015	Typhoon	
NE	SEVERE STORMS, TORNADOES, STRAIGHT-LINE WINDS, AND FLOODING	DR-4225-NE	2015	Severe Storm	
AR	SEVERE STORMS, TORNADOES, STRAIGHT-LINE WINDS, AND FLOODING	DR-4226-AR	2015	Severe Storm	
WY	SEVERE STORMS AND FLOODING	DR-4227-WY	2015	Flood	
LA	SEVERE STORMS AND FLOODING	DR-4228-LA	2015	Flood	
CO	SEVERE STORMS, TORNADOES, FLOODING, LANDSLIDES, AND MUDSLIDES	DR-4229-CO	2015	Flood	
KS	SEVERE STORMS, TORNADOES, STRAIGHT-LINE WINDS, AND FLOODING	DR-4230-KS	2015	Severe Storm	
NJ	SEVERE STORM	DR-4231-NJ	2015	Severe Storm	
VT	SEVERE STORM AND FLOODING	DR-4232-VT	2015	Severe Storm	
SD	SEVERE STORMS, TORNADOES, STRAIGHT-LINE WINDS, AND FLOODING	DR-4233-SD	2015	Severe Storm	
IA	SEVERE STORMS, TORNADOES, STRAIGHT-LINE WINDS, AND FLOODING	DR-4234-IA	2015	Severe Storm	
MP	TYPHOON SOUDELOR	DR-4235-MP	2015	Typhoon	
WV	SEVERE STORMS, STRAIGHT-LINE WINDS, FLOODING, LANDSLIDES, AND MUDSLIDES	DR-4236-WV	2015	Severe Storm	
SD	SEVERE STORMS, STRAIGHT-LINE WINDS, AND FLOODING	DR-4237-SD	2015	Severe Storm	
MO	SEVERE STORMS, TORNADOES, STRAIGHT-LINE WINDS, AND FLOODING	DR-4238-MO	2015	Severe Storm	
KY	SEVERE STORMS, TORNADOES, STRAIGHT-LINE WINDS, FLOODING, LANDSLIDES, AND MUDSLIDE	DR-4239-KY	2015	Severe Storm	
CA	VALLEY FIRE AND BUTTE FIRE	DR-4240-CA	2015	Fire	
PA	SEVERE STORMS, TORNADOES, AND FLOODING	DR-4149-PA	2014	Severe Storm	
KS	SEVERE STORMS, STRAIGHT-LINE WINDS, TORNADOES, AND FLOODING	DR-4150-KS	2014	Severe Storm	
NM	SEVERE STORMS AND FLOODING	DR-4151-NM	2014	Severe Storm	
NM	SEVERE STORMS, FLOODING, AND MUDSLIDES	DR-4152-NM	2014	Flood	
NC	SEVERE STORMS, FLOODING, LANDSLIDES, MUDSLIDES	DR-4153-NC	2014	Flood	
ND	SEVERE WINTER STORM	DR-4154-ND	2014	Severe Storm	
SD	SEVERE WINTER STORM, SNOWSTORM, AND FLOODING	DR-4155-SD	2014	Severe Storm	
NE	SEVERE STORMS, WINTER STORMS, TORNADOES AND FLOODING	DR-4156-NE	2014	Severe Storm	
IL	SEVERE STORMS, STRAIGHT-LINE WINDS, AND TORNADOES	DR-4157-IL	2014	Tornado	
CA	RIM FIRE	DR-4158-CA	2014	Fire	
TX	SEVERE STORMS AND FLOODING	DR-4159-TX	2014	Severe Storm	
AR	SEVERE WINTER STORM	DR-4160-AR	2014	Severe Ice Storm	
AK	FLOODING	DR-4161-AK	2014	Flood	
AK	SEVERE STORMS, STRAIGHT-LINE WINDS, AND FLOODING	DR-4162-AK	2014	Severe Storm	
VT	SEVERE WINTER STORMS	DR-4163-VT	2014	Severe Ice Storm	
OK	SEVERE WINTER STORM	DR-4164-OK	2014	Severe Storm	
GA	SEVERE WINTER STORM	DR-4165-GA	2014	Severe Ice Storm	
SC	SEVERE WINTER STORM	DR-4166-SC	2014	Severe Ice Storm	
NC	SEVERE WINTER STORM	DR-4167-NC	2014	Severe Ice Storm	
WA	FLOODING AND MUDSLIDES	DR-4168-WA	2014	Mud/Landslide	
OR	SEVERE WINTER STORM	DR-4169-OR	2014	Severe Storm	
MD	SNOWSTORM	DR-4170-MD	2014	Severe Storm	
TN	SEVERE WINTER STORM	DR-4171-TN	2014	Severe Ice Storm	
MT	ICE JAMS AND FLOODING	DR-4172-MT	2014	Flood	
IN	SEVERE WINTER STORM AND SNOWSTORM	DR-4173-IN	2014	Severe Storm	
AR	SEVERE STORMS,TORNADOES, AND FLOODING	DR-4174-AR	2014	Severe Storm	
MS	SEVERE STORMS, TORNADOES, AND FLOODING	DR-4175-MS	2014	Severe Storm	
AL	SEVERE STORMS, TORNADOES, STRAIGHT-LINE WINDS, AND FLOODING	DR-4176-AL	2014	Severe Storm	
FL	SEVERE STORMS, TORNADOES, STRAIGHT-LINE WINDS, AND FLOODING	DR-4177-FL	2014	Severe Storm	
VT	SEVERE STORMS AND FLOODING	DR-4178-VT	2014	Flood	
NE	SEVERE STORMS, TORNADOES, STRAIGHT-LINE WINDS, AND FLOODING	DR-4179-NE	2014	Tornado	
NY	SEVERE STORMS AND FLOODING	DR-4180-NY	2014	Severe Storm	
IA	SEVERE STORMS, TORNADOES, STRAIGHT-LINE WINDS, AND FLOODING	DR-4181-IA	2014	Severe Storm	
MN	SEVERE STORMS, STRAIGHT-LINE WINDS, FLOODING, LANDSLIDES, AND MUDSLIDES	DR-4182-MN	2014	Flood	
NE	SEVERE STORMS, TORNADOES, STRAIGHT-LINE WINDS, AND FLOODING	DR-4183-NE	2014	Severe Storm	
IA	SEVERE STORMS, TORNADOES, STRAIGHT-LINE WINDS, AND FLOODING	DR-4184-IA	2014	Flood	
NE	SEVERE STORMS, TORNADOES, STRAIGHT-LINE WINDS, AND FLOODING	DR-4185-NE	2014	Severe Storm	
SD	SEVERE STORMS, TORNADOES, AND FLOODING	DR-4186-SD	2014	Flood	
IA	SEVERE STORMS, TORNADOES, STRAIGHT-LINE WINDS, AND FLOODING	DR-4187-IA	2014	Severe Storm	
WA	WILDFIRES	DR-4188-WA	2014	Fire	
TN	SEVERE STORMS, TORNADOES, STRAIGHT-LINE WINDS, AND FLOODING	DR-4189-TN	2014	Severe Storm	
ND	SEVERE STORMS AND FLOODING	DR-4190-ND	2014	Flood	
GU	TROPICAL STORM HALONG	DR-4191-GU	2014	Severe Storm	
AS	SEVERE STORMS, FLOODING, AND LANDSLIDES	DR-4192-AS	2014	Severe Storm	
CA	EARTHQUAKE	DR-4193-CA	2014	Earthquake	
HI	TROPICAL STORM ISELLE	DR-4194-HI	2014	Severe Storm	
MI	SEVERE STORMS AND FLOODING	DR-4195-MI	2014	Flood	
KY	SEVERE STORMS, FLOODING, LANDSLIDES, AND MUDSLIDES	DR-4196-KY	2014	Severe Storm	
FL	HURRICANE ISAAC	DR-4084-FL	2013	Hurricane	
NY	HURRICANE SANDY	DR-4085-NY	2013	Hurricane	
NJ	HURRICANE SANDY	DR-4086-NJ	2013	Hurricane	
CT	HURRICANE SANDY	DR-4087-CT	2013	Hurricane	
UT	SEVERE STORM AND FLOODING	DR-4088-UT	2013	Flood	
RI	HURRICANE SANDY	DR-4089-RI	2013	Hurricane	
DE	HURRICANE SANDY	DR-4090-DE	2013	Hurricane	
MD	HURRICANE SANDY	DR-4091-MD	2013	Hurricane	
VA	HURRICANE SANDY	DR-4092-VA	2013	Hurricane	
WV	HURRICANE SANDY	DR-4093-WV	2013	Hurricane	
AK	SEVERE STORM, STRAIGHT-LINE WINDS, FLOODING, AND LANDSLIDES	DR-4094-AK	2013	Severe Storm	
NH	HURRICANE SANDY	DR-4095-NH	2013	Hurricane	
DC	HURRICANE SANDY	DR-4096-DC	2013	Hurricane	
MA	HURRICANE SANDY	DR-4097-MA	2013	Hurricane	
OH	SEVERE STORMS AND FLOODING DUE TO THE REMNANTS OF HURRICANE SANDY	DR-4098-OH	2013	Hurricane	
PA	HURRICANE SANDY	DR-4099-PA	2013	Hurricane	
AR	SEVERE WINTER STORM	DR-4100-AR	2013	Severe Ice Storm	
MS	SEVERE STORMS, TORNADOES, AND FLOODING	DR-4101-MS	2013	Severe Storm	
LA	SEVERE STORMS AND FLOODING	DR-4102-LA	2013	Severe Storm	
NC	SEVERE STORMS, FLOODING, LANDSLIDES, AND MUDSLIDES	DR-4103-NC	2013	Mud/Landslide	
AZ	SEVERE FREEZE	DR-4104-AZ	2013	Freezing	
NH	SEVERE WINTER STORM AND SNOWSTORM	DR-4105-NH	2013	Severe Storm	
CT	SEVERE WINTER STORM AND SNOWSTORM	DR-4106-CT	2013	Severe Storm	
RI	SEVERE WINTER STORM AND SNOWSTORM	DR-4107-RI	2013	Severe Storm	
ME	SEVERE WINTER STORM, SNOWSTORM, AND FLOODING	DR-4108-ME	2013	Severe Storm	
OK	SEVERE WINTER STORM AND SNOWSTORM	DR-4109-OK	2013	Severe Storm	
MA	SEVERE WINTER STORM, SNOWSTORM, AND FLOODING	DR-4110-MA	2013	Severe Storm	
NY	SEVERE WINTER STORM AND SNOWSTORM	DR-4111-NY	2013	Severe Storm	
KS	SNOWSTORM	DR-4112-KS	2013	Snowstorm	
MN	SEVERE WINTER STORM	DR-4113-MN	2013	Severe Storm	
IA	SEVERE WINTER STORM	DR-4114-IA	2013	Severe Storm	
SD	SEVERE WINTER STORM AND SNOWSTORM	DR-4115-SD	2013	Severe Storm	
IL	SEVERE STORMS, STRAIGHT-LINE WINDS, AND FLOODING	DR-4116-IL	2013	Flood	
OK	SEVERE STORMS, TORNADOES, AND FLOODING	DR-4117-OK	2013	Tornado	
ND	FLOODING	DR-4118-ND	2013	Flood	
IA	SEVERE STORMS, STRAIGHT-LINE WINDS, AND FLOODING	DR-4119-IA	2013	Flood	
VT	SEVERE STORMS AND FLOODING	DR-4120-VT	2013	Flood	
MI	FLOODING	DR-4121-MI	2013	Flood	
AK	FLOODING	DR-4122-AK	2013	Flood	
ND	SEVERE STORMS AND FLOODING	DR-4123-ND	2013	Flood	
AR	SEVERE STORMS, TORNADOES, AND FLOODING	DR-4124-AR	2013	Severe Storm	
SD	SEVERE STORMS, TORNADO, AND FLOODING	DR-4125-SD	2013	Severe Storm	
IA	SEVERE STORMS, TORNADOES, AND FLOODING	DR-4126-IA	2013	Severe Storm	
MT	FLOODING	DR-4127-MT	2013	Flood	
ND	SEVERE STORMS AND FLOODING	DR-4128-ND	2013	Severe Storm	
NY	SEVERE STORMS AND FLOODING	DR-4129-NY	2013	Flood	
MO	SEVERE STORMS, STRAIGHT-LINE WINDS, TORNADOES, AND FLOODING	DR-4130-MO	2013	Severe Storm	
MN	SEVERE STORMS, STRAIGHT-LINE WINDS, AND FLOODING	DR-4131-MN	2013	Severe Storm	
WV	SEVERE STORMS AND FLOODING	DR-4132-WV	2013	Flood	
CO	ROYAL GORGE FIRE	DR-4133-CO	2013	Fire	
CO	BLACK FOREST WILDFIRE	DR-4134-CO	2013	Fire	
IA	SEVERE STORMS, TORNADOES, AND FLOODING	DR-4135-IA	2013	Severe Storm	
TX	EXPLOSION	DR-4136-TX	2013	Other	
SD	SEVERE STORMS, TORNADOES, AND FLOODING	DR-4137-SD	2013	Severe Storm	
FL	SEVERE STORMS AND FLOODING	DR-4138-FL	2013	Severe Storm	
NH	SEVERE STORMS, TORNADOES, AND FLOODING	DR-4139-NH	2013	Severe Storm	
VT	SEVERE STORMS AND FLOODING	DR-4140-VT	2013	Flood	
WI	SEVERE STORMS, FLOODING, AND MUDSLIDES	DR-4141-WI	2013	Severe Storm	
CA	WILDFIRE	DR-4142-CA	2013	Fire	
AR	SEVERE STORMS AND FLOODING	DR-4143-AR	2013	Severe Storm	
MO	SEVERE STORMS, STRAIGHT-LINE WINDS AND FLOODING	DR-4144-MO	2013	Severe Storm	
CO	SEVERE STORMS, FLOODING, LANDSLIDES, AND MUDSLIDES	DR-4145-CO	2013	Flood	
NC	SEVERE STORMS, FLOODING, LANDSLIDES, AND MUDSLIDES	DR-4146-NC	2013	Flood	
NM	SEVERE STORMS AND FLOODING	DR-4147-NM	2013	Severe Storm	
NM	SEVERE STORMS AND FLOODING	DR-4148-NM	2013	Severe Storm	
MD	REMNANTS OF TROPICAL STORM LEE	DR-4038-MD	2012	Flood	
NJ	REMNANTS OF TROPICAL STORM LEE	DR-4039-NJ	2012	Severe Storm	
PR	TROPICAL STORM MARIA	DR-4040-PR	2012	Hurricane	
LA	TROPICAL STORM LEE	DR-4041-LA	2012	Coastal Storm	
VA	EARTHQUAKE	DR-4042-VA	2012	Earthquake	
VT	SEVERE STORMS AND FLOODING	DR-4043-VT	2012	Severe Storm	
DC	EARTHQUAKE	DR-4044-DC	2012	Earthquake	
VA	THE REMNANTS OF TROPICAL STORM LEE	DR-4045-VA	2012	Severe Storm	
CT	SEVERE STORM	DR-4046-CT	2012	Severe Storm	
NM	FLOODING	DR-4047-NM	2012	Flood	
NJ	SEVERE STORM	DR-4048-NJ	2012	Severe Storm	
NH	SEVERE STORM AND SNOWSTORM	DR-4049-NH	2012	Severe Storm	
AK	SEVERE WINTER STORMS AND FLOODING	DR-4050-AK	2012	Severe Storm	
MA	SEVERE STORM AND SNOWSTORM	DR-4051-MA	2012	Severe Storm	
AL	SEVERE STORMS, TORNADOES, STRAIGHT-LINE WINDS, AND FLOODING	DR-4052-AL	2012	Severe Storm	
UT	SEVERE STORM	DR-4053-UT	2012	Severe Storm	
AK	SEVERE STORM	DR-4054-AK	2012	Severe Storm	
OR	SEVERE WINTER STORM, FLOODING, LANDSLIDES, AND MUDSLIDES	DR-4055-OR	2012	Flood	
WA	SEVERE WINTER STORM, FLOODING, LANDSLIDES, AND MUDSLIDES	DR-4056-WA	2012	Severe Storm	
KY	SEVERE STORMS, TORNADOES, STRAIGHT-LINE WINDS AND FLOODING	DR-4057-KY	2012	Severe Storm	
IN	SEVERE STORMS, STRAIGHT-LINE WINDS, AND TORNADOES	DR-4058-IN	2012	Severe Storm	
WV	SEVERE STORMS, TORNADOES, FLOODING, MUDSLIDES, AND LANDSLIDES	DR-4059-WV	2012	Severe Storm	
TN	SEVERE STORMS, TORNADOES, STRAIGHT-LINE WINDS AND	DR-4060-TN	2012	Severe Storm	
WV	SEVERE STORMS, FLOODING, MUDSLIDES, AND LANSLIDES	DR-4061-WV	2012	Severe Storm	
HI	SEVERE STORMS, FLOODING, AND LANDSLIDES	DR-4062-HI	2012	Severe Storm	
KS	SEVERE STORMS, TORNADOES, STRAIGHT-LINE WINDS, AND FLOODING	DR-4063-KS	2012	Severe Storm	
OK	SEVERE STORMS, TORNADOES, STRAIGHT-LINE WINDS, AND FLOODING	DR-4064-OK	2012	Severe Storm	
NH	SEVERE STORM AND FLOODING	DR-4065-NH	2012	Severe Storm	
VT	SEVERE STORM, TORNADO, AND FLOODING	DR-4066-VT	2012	Severe Storm	
CO	HIGH PARK AND WALDO CANYON WILDFIRES	DR-4067-CO	2012	Fire	
FL	TROPICAL STORM DEBBY	DR-4068-FL	2012	Severe Storm	
MN	SEVERE STORMS AND FLOODING	DR-4069-MN	2012	Severe Storm	
NJ	SEVERE STORMS AND STRAIGHT-LINE WINDS	DR-4070-NJ	2012	Severe Storm	
WV	SEVERE STORMS AND STRAIGHT-LINE WINDS	DR-4071-WV	2012	Severe Storm	
VA	SEVERE STORMS AND STRAIGHT-LINE WINDS	DR-4072-VA	2012	Severe Storm	
DC	SEVERE STORMS	DR-4073-DC	2012	Severe Storm	
MT	WILDFIRE	DR-4074-MT	2012	Fire	
MD	SEVERE STORMS AND STRAIGHT-LINE WINDS	DR-4075-MD	2012	Severe Storm	
WI	SEVERE STORMS AND FLOODING	DR-4076-WI	2012	Severe Storm	
OH	SEVERE STORMS AND STRAIGHT-LINE WINDS	DR-4077-OH	2012	Severe Storm	
OK	FREEDOM AND NOBLE WILDFIRES	DR-4078-OK	2012	Fire	
NM	FLOODING	DR-4079-NM	2012	Flood	
LA	HURRICANE ISAAC	DR-4080-LA	2012	Hurricane	
MS	HURRICANE ISAAC	DR-4081-MS	2012	Hurricane	
AL	HURRICANE ISAAC	DR-4082-AL	2012	Hurricane	
WA	SEVERE STORM, STRAIGHT-LINE WINDS, AND FLOODING	DR-4083-WA	2012	Severe Storm	
AZ	SEVERE STORMS AND FLOODING	DR-1940-AZ	2011	Severe Storm	
MN	SEVERE STORMS AND FLOODING	DR-1941-MN	2011	Severe Storm	
NC	SEVERE STORMS, FLOODING, AND STRAIGHT-LINE WINDS	DR-1942-NC	2011	Severe Storm	
NY	SEVERE STORMS, TORNADOES, AND STRAIGHT-LINE WINDS	DR-1943-NY	2011	Tornado	
WI	SEVERE STORMS AND FLOODING	DR-1944-WI	2011	Severe Storm	
NE	SEVERE STORMS, FLOODING, TORNADO, AND STRAIGHT-LIN	DR-1945-NE	2011	Severe Storm	
PR	SEVERE STORMS, FLOODING, MUDSLIDES, AND LANDSLIDES ASSOC W TS OTTO	DR-1946-PR	2011	Severe Storm	
SD	SEVERE STORMS AND FLOODING	DR-1947-SD	2011	Severe Storm	
VI	SEVERE STORMS, FLOODING, MUDSLIDES, AND LANDSLIDES	DR-1948-VI	2011	Severe Storm	
VI	SEVERE STORMS, FLOODING, ROCKSLIDES, AND MUDSLIDES ASSOC. WITH TS TOMAS	DR-1949-VI	2011	Severe Storm	
AZ	SEVERE STORMS AND FLOODING	DR-1950-AZ	2011	Severe Storm	
VT	SEVERE STORM	DR-1951-VT	2011	Severe Storm	
CA	SEVERE WINTER STORMS, FLOODING, AND DEBRIS AND MUD FLOWS	DR-1952-CA	2011	Flood	
ME	SEVERE STORMS AND FLOODING	DR-1953-ME	2011	Severe Storm	
NJ	SEVERE WINTER STORM AND SNOWSTORM	DR-1954-NJ	2011	Snowstorm	
UT	SEVERE WINTER STORM AND FLOODING	DR-1955-UT	2011	Flood	
OR	SEVERE WINTER STORM, FLOODING, MUDSLIDES, LANDSLIDES, AND DEBRIS FLOWS	DR-1956-OR	2011	Severe Storm	
NY	SEVERE WINTER STORM AND SNOWSTORM	DR-1957-NY	2011	Severe Storm	
CT	SNOWSTORM	DR-1958-CT	2011	Snowstorm	
MA	SEVERE WINTER STORM AND SNOWSTORM	DR-1959-MA	2011	Snowstorm	
IL	SEVERE WINTER STORM AND SNOWSTORM	DR-1960-IL	2011	Snowstorm	
MO	SEVERE WINTER STORM AND SNOWSTORM	DR-1961-MO	2011	Severe Storm	
NM	SEVERE WINTER STORM AND EXTREME COLD TEMPERATURES	DR-1962-NM	2011	Severe Storm	
WA	SEVERE WINTER STORM, FLOODING, LANDSLIDES, AND MUDSLIDES	DR-1963-WA	2011	Severe Storm	
OR	TSUNAMI WAVE SURGE	DR-1964-OR	2011	Tsunami	
TN	SEVERE STORMS, TORNADOES, AND FLOODING	DR-1965-TN	2011	Severe Storm	
WI	SEVERE WINTER STORM AND SNOWSTORM	DR-1966-WI	2011	Snowstorm	
HI	TSUNAMI WAVES	DR-1967-HI	2011	Tsunami	
CA	TSUNAMI WAVES	DR-1968-CA	2011	Tsunami	
NC	SEVERE STORMS, TORNADOES, AND FLOODING	DR-1969-NC	2011	Severe Storm	
OK	SEVERE STORMS, TORNADOES, AND STRAIGHT-LINE WINDS	DR-1970-OK	2011	Severe Storm	
AL	SEVERE STORMS, TORNADOES, STRAIGHT-LINE WINDS, AND FLOODING	DR-1971-AL	2011	Severe Storm	
MS	SEVERE STORMS, TORNADOES, STRAIGHT-LINE WINDS, AND ASSOCIATED FLOODING	DR-1972-MS	2011	Severe Storm	
GA	SEVERE STORMS, TORNADOES, STRAIGHT-LINE WINDS, AND ASSOCIATED FLOODING	DR-1973-GA	2011	Severe Storm	
TN	SEVERE STORMS, TORNADOES, STRAIGHT-LINE WINDS, AND ASSOCIATED FLOODING	DR-1974-TN	2011	Severe Storm	
AR	SEVERE STORMS, TORNADOES, AND ASSOCIATED FLOODING	DR-1975-AR	2011	Severe Storm	
KY	SEVERE STORMS, TORNADOES, AND FLOODING	DR-1976-KY	2011	Severe Storm	
IA	SEVERE STORMS, TORNADOES, AND STRAIGHT-LINE WINDS	DR-1977-IA	2011	Severe Storm	
TN	SEVERE STORMS, FLOODING, TORNADOES, AND STRAIGHT-LINE WINDS	DR-1978-TN	2011	Severe Storm	
TN	SEVERE STORMS, STRAIGHT-LINE WINDS, TORNADOES, AND FLOODING	DR-1979-TN	2011	Severe Storm	
MO	SEVERE STORMS, TORNADOES, AND FLOODING	DR-1980-MO	2011	Severe Storm	
ND	FLOODING	DR-1981-ND	2011	Flood	
MN	SEVERE STORMS AND FLOODING	DR-1982-MN	2011	Flood	
MS	FLOODING	DR-1983-MS	2011	Flood	
SD	FLOODING	DR-1984-SD	2011	Flood	
OK	SEVERE WINTER STORM AND SNOWSTORM	DR-1985-OK	2011	Severe Storm	
ND	SEVERE WINTER STORM	DR-1986-ND	2011	Severe Storm	
ID	FLOODING, LANDSLIDES, AND MUDSLIDES	DR-1987-ID	2011	Flood	
OK	SEVERE STORMS AND FLOODING	DR-1988-OK	2011	Severe Storm	
OK	SEVERE STORMS, TORNADOES, STRAIGHT-LINE WINDS, AND FLOODING	DR-1989-OK	2011	Severe Storm	
MN	SEVERE STORMS AND TORNADOES	DR-1990-MN	2011	Severe Storm	
IL	SEVERE STORMS AND FLOODING	DR-1991-IL	2011	Severe Storm	
AK	ICE JAM AND FLOODING	DR-1992-AK	2011	Flood	
NY	SEVERE STORMS, FLOODING, TORNADOES, AND STRAIGHT-LINE WINDS	DR-1993-NY	2011	Flood	
MA	SEVERE STORMS AND TORNADOES	DR-1994-MA	2011	Tornado	
VT	SEVERE STORMS AND FLOODING	DR-1995-VT	2011	Severe Storm	
MT	SEVERE STORMS AND FLOODING	DR-1996-MT	2011	Severe Storm	
IN	SEVERE STORMS, TORNADOES, STRAIGHT-LINE WINDS, AND	DR-1997-IN	2011	Severe Storm	
IA	FLOODING	DR-1998-IA	2011	Flood	
TX	WILDFIRES	DR-1999-TX	2011	Fire	
AR	SEVERE STORMS, TORNADOES, AND FLOODING	DR-4000-AR	2011	Severe Storm	
VT	SEVERE STORMS AND FLOODING	DR-4001-VT	2011	Severe Storm	
OH	SEVERE STORMS AND FLOODING	DR-4002-OH	2011	Severe Storm	
PA	SEVERE STORMS AND FLOODING	DR-4003-PA	2011	Severe Storm	
PR	SEVERE STORMS, FLOODING, MUDSLIDES, AND LANDSLIDES	DR-4004-PR	2011	Severe Storm	
TN	SEVERE STORMS, STRAIGHT-LINE WINDS, TORNADOES, AND	DR-4005-TN	2011	Severe Storm	
NH	SEVERE STORMS AND FLOODING	DR-4006-NH	2011	Flood	
WY	SEVERE STORMS, FLOODING, AND LANDSLIDES	DR-4007-WY	2011	Severe Storm	
KY	SEVERE STORMS, TORNADOES, AND FLOODING	DR-4008-KY	2011	Severe Storm	
MN	SEVERE STORMS, FLOODING, AND TORNADOES	DR-4009-MN	2011	Severe Storm	
KS	SEVERE STORMS, STRAIGHT-LINE WINDS, TORNADOES, AND FLOODING	DR-4010-KS	2011	Severe Storm	
UT	FLOODING	DR-4011-UT	2011	Flood	
MO	FLOODING	DR-4012-MO	2011	Flood	
NE	FLOODING	DR-4013-NE	2011	Flood	
NE	SEVERE STORMS, TORNADOES, STRAIGHT LINE WINDS, AND FLOODING	DR-4014-NE	2011	Severe Storm	
LA	FLOODING	DR-4015-LA	2011	Flood	
IA	SEVERE STORMS, STRAIGHT-LINE WINDS, AND FLOODING	DR-4016-IA	2011	Severe Storm	
PR	HURRICANE IRENE	DR-4017-PR	2011	Hurricane	
IA	SEVERE STORMS AND FLOODING	DR-4018-IA	2011	Severe Storm	
NC	HURRICANE IRENE	DR-4019-NC	2011	Hurricane	
NY	HURRICANE IRENE	DR-4020-NY	2011	Hurricane	
NJ	HURRICANE IRENE	DR-4021-NJ	2011	Hurricane	
VT	TROPICAL STORM IRENE	DR-4022-VT	2011	Hurricane	
CT	TROPICAL STORM IRENE	DR-4023-CT	2011	Hurricane	
VA	HURRICANE IRENE	DR-4024-VA	2011	Hurricane	
PA	HURRICANE IRENE	DR-4025-PA	2011	Hurricane	
NH	TROPICAL STORM IRENE	DR-4026-NH	2011	Hurricane	
RI	TROPICAL STORM IRENE	DR-4027-RI	2011	Hurricane	
MA	TROPICAL STORM IRENE	DR-4028-MA	2011	Hurricane	
TX	WILDFIRES	DR-4029-TX	2011	Fire	
PA	TROPICAL STORM LEE	DR-4030-PA	2011	Flood	
NY	REMNANTS OF TROPICAL STORM LEE	DR-4031-NY	2011	Severe Storm	
ME	TROPICAL STORM IRENE	DR-4032-ME	2011	Hurricane	
NJ	SEVERE STORMS AND FLOODING	DR-4033-NJ	2011	Severe Storm	
MD	HURRICANE IRENE	DR-4034-MD	2011	Hurricane	
KS	FLOODING	DR-4035-KS	2011	Flood	
DC	HURRICANE IRENE	DR-4036-DC	2011	Hurricane	
DE	HURRICANE IRENE	DR-4037-DE	2011	Hurricane	
AR	SEVERE STORMS, TORNADOES, AND FLOODING	DR-1861-AR	2010	Severe Storm	
VA	SEVERE STORMS AND FLOODING ASSOCIATED WITH TROPICAL DEPRESSION IDA AND A NOR'EAST	DR-1862-VA	2010	Severe Storm	
LA	SEVERE STORMS, TORNADOES, AND FLOODING	DR-1863-LA	2010	Severe Storm	
NE	SEVERE WINTER STORM	DR-1864-NE	2010	Severe Storm	
AK	SEVERE STORMS, FLOODING, MUDSLIDES, AND ROCKSLIDES	DR-1865-AK	2010	Severe Storm	
AL	TROPICAL STORM IDA	DR-1866-AL	2010	Hurricane	
NJ	SEVERE STORMS AND FLOODING ASSOCIATED WITH TROPICAL DEPRESSION IDA AND A NOR'EAS	DR-1867-NJ	2010	Severe Storm	
KS	SEVERE WINTER STORM	DR-1868-KS	2010	Severe Storm	
NY	SEVERE STORMS AND FLOODING ASSOC W TD IDA & NOR'EASTER	DR-1869-NY	2010	Severe Storm	
AL	SEVERE STORMS AND FLOODING	DR-1870-AL	2010	Severe Storm	
NC	SEVERE WINTER STORMS AND FLOODING	DR-1871-NC	2010	Severe Storm	
AR	SEVERE STORMS AND FLOODING	DR-1872-AR	2010	Severe Storm	
NJ	SNOWSTORM	DR-1873-NJ	2010	Snowstorm	
VA	SEVERE WINTER STORM AND SNOWSTORM	DR-1874-VA	2010	Snowstorm	
MD	SEVERE WINTER STORM AND SNOWSTORM	DR-1875-MD	2010	Snowstorm	
OK	SEVERE WINTER STORM	DR-1876-OK	2010	Severe Storm	
IA	SEVERE WINTER STORMS AND SNOWSTORM	DR-1877-IA	2010	Severe Storm	
NE	SEVERE WINTER STORMS AND SNOWSTORM	DR-1878-NE	2010	Severe Storm	
ND	SEVERE WINTER STORM	DR-1879-ND	2010	Severe Storm	
IA	SEVERE WINTER STORM	DR-1880-IA	2010	Severe Storm	
WV	SEVERE WINTER STORM AND SNOWSTORM	DR-1881-WV	2010	Snowstorm	
DC	SEVERE WINTER STORM AND SNOWSTORM	DR-1882-DC	2010	Snowstorm	
OK	SEVERE WINTER STORM	DR-1883-OK	2010	Severe Ice Storm	
CA	SEVERE WINTER STORMS, FLOODING, AND DEBRIS AND MUD FLOWS	DR-1884-CA	2010	Severe Storm	
KS	SEVERE WINTER STORMS AND SNOWSTORM	DR-1885-KS	2010	Severe Storm	
SD	SEVERE WINTER STORM AND SNOWSTORM	DR-1886-SD	2010	Severe Storm	
SD	SEVERE WINTER STORM	DR-1887-SD	2010	Severe Storm	
AZ	SEVERE WINTER STORMS AND FLOODING	DR-1888-AZ	2010	Severe Storm	
NJ	SEVERE WINTER STORM AND SNOWSTORM	DR-1889-NJ	2010	Snowstorm	
DC	SEVERE WINTER STORMS AND SNOWSTORMS	DR-1890-DC	2010	Severe Storm	
ME	SEVERE WINTER STORM	DR-1891-ME	2010	Severe Storm	
NH	SEVERE WINTER STORM	DR-1892-NH	2010	Severe Storm	
WV	SEVERE STORMS, FLOODING, MUDSLIDES, AND LANDSLIDES	DR-1893-WV	2010	Severe Storm	
RI	SEVERE STORMS AND FLOODING	DR-1894-RI	2010	Severe Storm	
MA	SEVERE STORMS AND FLOODING	DR-1895-MA	2010	Severe Storm	
DE	SEVERE WINTER STORMS AND SNOWSTORMS	DR-1896-DE	2010	Snowstorm	
NJ	SEVERE STORMS AND FLOODING	DR-1897-NJ	2010	Severe Storm	
PA	SEVERE WINTER STORMS AND SNOWSTORMS	DR-1898-PA	2010	Snowstorm	
NY	SEVERE STORMS AND FLOODING	DR-1899-NY	2010	Severe Storm	
MN	FLOODING	DR-1900-MN	2010	Flood	
ND	SEVERE WINTER STORM	DR-1901-ND	2010	Severe Storm	
NE	SEVERE STORMS, ICE JAMS, AND FLOODING	DR-1902-NE	2010	Flood	
WV	SEVERE WINTER STORMS AND SNOWSTORMS	DR-1903-WV	2010	Snowstorm	
CT	SEVERE STORMS AND FLOODING	DR-1904-CT	2010	Severe Storm	
VA	SEVERE WINTER STORMS AND SNOWSTORMS	DR-1905-VA	2010	Snowstorm	
MS	SEVERE STORMS, TORNADOES, AND FLOODING	DR-1906-MS	2010	Severe Storm	
ND	FLOODING	DR-1907-ND	2010	Flood	
AL	SEVERE STORMS, TORNADOES, STRAIGHT-LINE WINDS, AND FLOODING	DR-1908-AL	2010	Severe Storm	
TN	SEVERE STORMS, FLOODING, STRAIGHT-LINE WINDS, AND TORNADOES	DR-1909-TN	2010	Severe Storm	
MD	SEVERE WINTER STORMS AND SNOWSTORMS	DR-1910-MD	2010	Snowstorm	
CA	EARTHQUAKE	DR-1911-CA	2010	Earthquake	
KY	SEVERE STORMS, FLOODING, MUDSLIDES, AND TORNADOES	DR-1912-KY	2010	Severe Storm	
NH	SEVERE STORMS AND FLOODING	DR-1913-NH	2010	Severe Storm	
SD	SEVERE WINTER STORM	DR-1914-SD	2010	Severe Storm	
SD	FLOODING	DR-1915-SD	2010	Flood	
MS	SEVERE STORMS, TORNADOES, AND FLOODING	DR-1916-MS	2010	Severe Storm	
OK	SEVERE STORMS, TORNADOES, AND STRAIGHT-LINE WINDS	DR-1917-OK	2010	Severe Storm	
WV	SEVERE STORMS, FLOODING, MUDSLIDES, AND LANDSLIDES	DR-1918-WV	2010	Flood	
PR	SEVERE STORMS AND FLOODING	DR-1919-PR	2010	Severe Storm	
ME	SEVERE STORMS AND FLOODING	DR-1920-ME	2010	Severe Storm	
MN	SEVERE STORMS, TORNADOES, AND FLOODING	DR-1921-MN	2010	Tornado	
MT	SEVERE STORMS AND FLOODING	DR-1922-MT	2010	Severe Storm	
WY	FLOODING	DR-1923-WY	2010	Flood	
NE	SEVERE STORMS AND FLOODING	DR-1924-NE	2010	Severe Storm	
KY	SEVERE STORMS, FLOODING, AND MUDSLIDES	DR-1925-KY	2010	Severe Storm	
OK	SEVERE STORMS, TORNADOES, STRAIGHT-LINE WINDS, AND FLOODING	DR-1926-OK	2010	Severe Storm	
ID	SEVERE STORMS AND FLOODING	DR-1927-ID	2010	Severe Storm	
IA	SEVERE STORMS AND FLOODING	DR-1928-IA	2010	Severe Storm	
SD	SEVERE STORMS, TORNADOES, AND FLOODING	DR-1929-SD	2010	Severe Storm	
IA	SEVERE STORMS, FLOODING, AND TORNADOES	DR-1930-IA	2010	Severe Storm	
TX	HURRICANE ALEX	DR-1931-TX	2010	Hurricane	
KS	SEVERE STORMS, FLOODING, AND TORNADOES	DR-1932-KS	2010	Severe Storm	
WI	SEVERE STORMS, TORNADOES, AND FLOODING	DR-1933-WI	2010	Severe Storm	
MO	SEVERE STORMS, FLOODING, AND TORNADOES	DR-1934-MO	2010	Severe Storm	
IL	SEVERE STORMS AND FLOODING	DR-1935-IL	2010	Severe Storm	
NM	SEVERE STORMS AND FLOODING	DR-1936-NM	2010	Flood	
TN	SEVERE STORMS AND FLOODING	DR-1937-TN	2010	Severe Storm	
SD	SEVERE STORMS AND FLOODING	DR-1938-SD	2010	Severe Storm	
VI	HURRICANE EARL	DR-1939-VI	2010	Hurricane	0

=== 2005 - 2010 ===
State	Name	FEMA disaster code	Year declared	Disaster type	Notes
PR	SEVERE STORMS AND FLOODING	DR-1798-PR	2009	Severe Storm	
NH	SEVERE STORMS AND FLOODING	DR-1799-NH	2009	Severe Storm	
IL	SEVERE STORMS AND FLOODING	DR-1800-IL	2009	Severe Storm	
NC	TROPICAL STORM HANNA	DR-1801-NC	2009	Severe Storm	
KY	SEVERE WIND STORM ASSOCIATED WITH TROPICAL DEPRESSION IKE	DR-1802-KY	2009	Severe Storm	
OK	SEVERE STORMS, TORNADOES, AND FLOODING	DR-1803-OK	2009	Severe Storm	
AR	TROPICAL STORM IKE	DR-1804-AR	2009	Severe Storm	
OH	SEVERE WIND STORM ASSOCIATED WITH TROPICAL DEPRESSION IKE	DR-1805-OH	2009	Severe Storm	
FL	HURRICANE GUSTAV	DR-1806-FL	2009	Hurricane	
VI	HURRICANE OMAR	DR-1807-VI	2009	Hurricane	
KS	SEVERE STORMS, FLOODING, AND TORNADOES	DR-1808-KS	2009	Severe Storm	
MO	SEVERE STORMS, FLOODING, AND A TORNADO	DR-1809-MO	2009	Severe Storm	
CA	WILDFIRES	DR-1810-CA	2009	Fire	
SD	SEVERE WINTER STORM AND RECORD AND NEAR RECORD SNOW	DR-1811-SD	2009	Snowstorm	
NH	SEVERE WINTER STORM	DR-1812-NH	2009	Severe Ice Storm	
MA	SEVERE WINTER STORM AND FLOODING	DR-1813-MA	2009	Severe Ice Storm	
HI	SEVERE STORMS AND FLOODING	DR-1814-HI	2009	Flood	
ME	SEVERE WINTER STORM AND FLOODING	DR-1815-ME	2009	Severe Storm	
VT	SEVERE WINTER STORM	DR-1816-VT	2009	Severe Ice Storm	
WA	SEVERE WINTER STORM, LANDSLIDES, MUDSLIDES, AND FLOODING	DR-1817-WA	2009	Flood	
KY	SEVERE WINTER STORM AND FLOODING	DR-1818-KY	2009	Severe Ice Storm	
AR	SEVERE WINTER STORM	DR-1819-AR	2009	Severe Storm	
OK	SEVERE STORMS AND TORNADOES	DR-1820-OK	2009	Severe Storm	
TN	SEVERE WINTER STORM AND FLOODING	DR-1821-TN	2009	Severe Ice Storm	
MO	SEVERE WINTER STORM	DR-1822-MO	2009	Severe Storm	
OK	SEVERE WINTER STORM	DR-1823-OK	2009	Severe Storm	
OR	SEVERE WINTER STORM, RECORD AND NEAR RECORD SNOW	DR-1824-OR	2009	Severe Storm	
WA	SEVERE WINTER STORM AND RECORD AND NEAR RECORD SNOW	DR-1825-WA	2009	Severe Storm	
IL	SEVERE WINTER STORM	DR-1826-IL	2009	Severe Storm	
NY	SEVERE WINTER STORM	DR-1827-NY	2009	Severe Storm	
IN	SEVERE WINTER STORM	DR-1828-IN	2009	Severe Storm	
ND	SEVERE STORMS AND FLOODING	DR-1829-ND	2009	Severe Storm	
MN	SEVERE STORMS AND FLOODING	DR-1830-MN	2009	Severe Storm	
FL	SEVERE STORMS, FLOODING, TORNADOES, AND STRAIGHT-LINE WINDS	DR-1831-FL	2009	Severe Storm	
IN	SEVERE STORMS, TORNADOES, AND FLOODING	DR-1832-IN	2009	Severe Storm	
GA	SEVERE STORMS, FLOODING, TORNADOES, AND STRAIGHT-LINE WINDS	DR-1833-GA	2009	Severe Storm	
AR	SEVERE STORMS AND TORNADOES	DR-1834-AR	2009	Tornado	
AL	SEVERE STORMS, FLOODING, TORNADOES & STRAIGHT-LINE	DR-1835-AL	2009	Severe Storm	
AL	SEVERE STORMS, FLOODING, TORNADOES, AND STRAIGHT-LINE WINDS	DR-1836-AL	2009	Severe Storm	
MS	SEVERE STORMS, FLOODING, AND TORNADOES	DR-1837-MS	2009	Severe Storm	
WV	SEVERE STORMS, FLOODING, MUDSLIDES, AND LANDSLIDES	DR-1838-WV	2009	Severe Storm	
TN	SEVERE STORMS, TORNADOES, AND FLOODING	DR-1839-TN	2009	Severe Storm	
FL	SEVERE STORMS, FLOODING, TORNADOES, AND STRAIGHT-LINE WINDS	DR-1840-FL	2009	Severe Storm	
KY	SEVERE STORMS, TORNADOES, FLOODING AND MUDSLIDES	DR-1841-KY	2009	Severe Storm	
AL	SEVERE STORMS, TORNADOES, FLOODING, AND STRAIGHT-LINE WINDS	DR-1842-AL	2009	Severe Storm	
AK	FLOODING AND ICE JAMS	DR-1843-AK	2009	Flood	
SD	SEVERE STORMS AND FLOODING	DR-1844-SD	2009	Severe Storm	
AR	SEVERE STORMS, TORNADOES, AND FLOODING	DR-1845-AR	2009	Severe Storm	
OK	WILDFIRES	DR-1846-OK	2009	Fire	
MO	SEVERE STORMS, TORNADOES, AND FLOODING	DR-1847-MO	2009	Severe Storm	
KS	SEVERE WINTER STORM AND RECORD AND NEAR RECORD SNOW	DR-1848-KS	2009	Severe Storm	
KS	SEVERE STORMS, FLOODING, STRAIGHT-LINE WINDS, AND TORNADOES	DR-1849-KS	2009	Severe Storm	
IL	SEVERE STORMS, FLOODING, AND TORNADOES	DR-1850-IL	2009	Severe Storm	
TN	SEVERE STORMS, TORNADOES, STRAIGHT-LINE WINDS, AND FLOODING	DR-1851-TN	2009	Severe Storm	
ME	SEVERE STORMS, FLOODING, AND LANDSLIDES	DR-1852-ME	2009	Severe Storm	
NE	SEVERE STORMS, FLOODING, AND TORNADOES	DR-1853-NE	2009	Severe Storm	
IA	SEVERE STORM	DR-1854-IA	2009	Severe Storm	
KY	SEVERE STORMS, STRAIGHT-LINE WINDS AND FLOODING	DR-1855-KY	2009	Severe Storm	
TN	SEVERE STORMS AND FLOODING	DR-1856-TN	2009	Severe Storm	
NY	SEVERE STORMS AND FLOODING	DR-1857-NY	2009	Severe Storm	
GA	SEVERE STORMS AND FLOODING	DR-1858-GA	2009	Severe Storm	
AS	EARTHQUAKE,TSUNAMI, AND FLOODING	DR-1859-AS	2009	Earthquake	
KS	SEVERE STORMS AND FLOODING	DR-1860-KS	2009	Severe Storm	
TX	TROPICAL STORM ERIN	DR-1730-TX	2008	Severe Storm	
CA	WILDFIRES, FLOODING, MUD FLOWS, AND DEBRIS FLOWS	DR-1731-CA	2008	Fire	
IN	SEVERE STORMS AND FLOODING	DR-1732-IN	2008	Severe Storm	
OR	SEVERE STORMS, FLOODING, LANDSLIDES, AND MUDSLIDES	DR-1733-OR	2008	Severe Storm	
WA	SEVERE STORMS, FLOODING, LANDSLIDES, AND MUDSLIDES	DR-1734-WA	2008	Severe Storm	
OK	SEVERE WINTER STORMS	DR-1735-OK	2008	Severe Ice Storm	
MO	SEVERE WINTER STORMS	DR-1736-MO	2008	Severe Ice Storm	
IA	SEVERE WINTER STORM	DR-1737-IA	2008	Severe Ice Storm	
NV	SEVERE WINTER STORMS AND FLOODING	DR-1738-NV	2008	Severe Storm	
NE	SEVERE WINTER STORM	DR-1739-NE	2008	Severe Ice Storm	
IN	SEVERE STORMS AND FLOODING	DR-1740-IN	2008	Severe Storm	
KS	SEVERE WINTER STORMS	DR-1741-KS	2008	Severe Storm	
MO	SEVERE STORMS, TORNADOES, AND FLOODING	DR-1742-MO	2008	Severe Storm	
HI	SEVERE STORMS, HIGH SURF, FLOODING, AND MUDSLIDES	DR-1743-HI	2008	Severe Storm	
AR	SEVERE STORMS, TORNADOES, AND FLOODING	DR-1744-AR	2008	Severe Storm	
TN	SEVERE STORMS, TORNADOES, STRAIGHT-LINE WINDS, AND FLOODING	DR-1745-TN	2008	Severe Storm	
KY	SEVERE STORMS, TORNADOES, STRAIGHT-LINE WINDS, AND	DR-1746-KY	2008	Severe Storm	
IL	SEVERE STORMS AND FLOODING	DR-1747-IL	2008	Severe Storm	
MO	SEVERE WINTER STORMS AND FLOODING	DR-1748-MO	2008	Severe Ice Storm	
MO	SEVERE STORMS AND FLOODING	DR-1749-MO	2008	Severe Storm	
GA	SEVERE STORMS AND TORNADOES	DR-1750-GA	2008	Severe Storm	
AR	SEVERE STORMS, TORNADOES, AND FLOODING	DR-1751-AR	2008	Severe Storm	
OK	SEVERE STORMS, TORNADOES, AND FLOODING	DR-1752-OK	2008	Severe Storm	
MS	SEVERE STORMS AND FLOODING	DR-1753-MS	2008	Severe Storm	
OK	SEVERE STORMS, TORNADOES, AND FLOODING	DR-1754-OK	2008	Flood	
ME	SEVERE STORMS AND FLOODING	DR-1755-ME	2008	Flood	
OK	SEVERE STORMS, TORNADOES, AND FLOODING	DR-1756-OK	2008	Severe Storm	
KY	SEVERE STORMS, TORNADOES, FLOODING, MUDSLIDES, AND LANDSLIDES	DR-1757-KY	2008	Severe Storm	
AR	SEVERE STORMS, FLOODING, AND TORNADOES	DR-1758-AR	2008	Severe Storm	
SD	SEVERE WINTER STORM AND RECORD AND NEAR RECORD SNOW	DR-1759-SD	2008	Snowstorm	
MO	SEVERE STORMS AND TORNADOES	DR-1760-MO	2008	Severe Storm	
GA	SEVERE STORMS AND TORNADOES	DR-1761-GA	2008	Severe Storm	
CO	SEVERE STORMS AND TORNADOES	DR-1762-CO	2008	Severe Storm	
IA	SEVERE STORMS, TORNADOES, AND FLOODING	DR-1763-IA	2008	Severe Storm	
MS	SEVERE STORMS AND TORNADOES	DR-1764-MS	2008	Severe Storm	
NE	SEVERE STORMS, TORNADOES, AND FLOODING	DR-1765-NE	2008	Severe Storm	
IN	SEVERE STORMS, FLOODING, AND TORNADOES	DR-1766-IN	2008	Severe Storm	
MT	SEVERE WINTER STORM	DR-1767-MT	2008	Severe Storm	
WI	SEVERE STORMS, TORNADOES, AND FLOODING	DR-1768-WI	2008	Severe Storm	
WV	SEVERE STORMS, TORNADOES, FLOODING, MUDSLIDES, AND	DR-1769-WV	2008	Severe Storm	
NE	SEVERE STORMS, TORNADOES, AND FLOODING	DR-1770-NE	2008	Severe Storm	
IL	SEVERE STORMS AND FLOODING	DR-1771-IL	2008	Severe Storm	
MN	SEVERE STORMS AND FLOODING	DR-1772-MN	2008	Severe Storm	
MO	SEVERE STORMS AND FLOODING	DR-1773-MO	2008	Severe Storm	
SD	SEVERE STORMS AND FLOODING	DR-1774-SD	2008	Severe Storm	
OK	SEVERE STORMS AND FLOODING	DR-1775-OK	2008	Severe Storm	
KS	SEVERE STORMS, FLOODING AND TORNADOES	DR-1776-KS	2008	Severe Storm	
MI	SEVERE STORMS, TORNADOES, AND FLOODING	DR-1777-MI	2008	Severe Storm	
VT	SEVERE STORMS AND FLOODING	DR-1778-VT	2008	Severe Storm	
NE	SEVERE STORMS, STRAIGHT-LINE WINDS, AND FLOODING	DR-1779-NE	2008	Severe Storm	
TX	HURRICANE DOLLY	DR-1780-TX	2008	Hurricane	
ID	FLOODING	DR-1781-ID	2008	Flood	
NH	SEVERE STORMS, TORNADO, AND FLOODING	DR-1782-NH	2008	Severe Storm	
NM	SEVERE STORMS AND FLOODING	DR-1783-NM	2008	Severe Storm	
VT	SEVERE STORMS, A TORNADO, AND FLOODING	DR-1784-VT	2008	Severe Storm	
FL	TROPICAL STORM FAY	DR-1785-FL	2008	Severe Storm	
LA	HURRICANE GUSTAV	DR-1786-LA	2008	Hurricane	
NH	SEVERE STORMS AND FLOODING	DR-1787-NH	2008	Severe Storm	
ME	SEVERE STORMS, FLOODING, AND TORNADOES	DR-1788-ME	2008	Severe Storm	
AL	HURRICANE GUSTAV	DR-1789-AL	2008	Hurricane	
VT	SEVERE STORMS AND FLOODING	DR-1790-VT	2008	Severe Storm	
TX	HURRICANE IKE	DR-1791-TX	2008	Hurricane	
LA	HURRICANE IKE	DR-1792-LA	2008	Hurricane	
AR	SEVERE STORMS AND FLOODING ASSOCIATED WITH HURRICANE GUSTAV	DR-1793-AR	2008	Hurricane	
MS	HURRICANE GUSTAV	DR-1794-MS	2008	Hurricane	
IN	SEVERE STORMS AND FLOODING	DR-1795-IN	2008	Severe Storm	
AK	SEVERE STORMS, FLOODING, LANDSLIDES, AND MUDSLIDES	DR-1796-AK	2008	Severe Storm	
AL	SEVERE STORMS AND FLOODING ASSOCIATED WITH HURRICANE IKE	DR-1797-AL	2008	Severe Storm	
IN	SEVERE STORMS AND FLOODING	DR-1662-IN	2007	Severe Storm	
AK	SEVERE STORMS, FLOODING, LANDSLIDES, AND MUDSLIDES	DR-1663-AK	2007	Severe Storm	
HI	EARTHQUAKE	DR-1664-HI	2007	Earthquake	
NY	SEVERE STORMS AND FLOODING	DR-1665-NY	2007	Severe Storm	
AK	FIRE	DR-1666-AK	2007	Fire	
MO	SEVERE STORMS	DR-1667-MO	2007	Severe Storm	
LA	SEVERE STORMS AND FLOODING	DR-1668-LA	2007	Severe Storm	
AK	SEVERE STORMS, FLOODING, LANDSLIDES, AND MUDSLIDES	DR-1669-AK	2007	Severe Storm	
NY	SEVERE STORMS AND FLOODING	DR-1670-NY	2007	Severe Storm	
WA	SEVERE STORMS, FLOODING, LANDSLIDES, AND MUDSLIDES	DR-1671-WA	2007	Severe Storm	
OR	SEVERE STORMS, FLOODING, LANDSLIDES, AND MUDSLIDES	DR-1672-OR	2007	Severe Storm	
MO	SEVERE WINTER STORMS	DR-1673-MO	2007	Severe Storm	
NE	SEVERE WINTER STORMS	DR-1674-NE	2007	Severe Storm	
KS	SEVERE WINTER STORM	DR-1675-KS	2007	Severe Storm	
MO	SEVERE WINTER STORMS AND FLOODING	DR-1676-MO	2007	Severe Ice Storm	
OK	SEVERE WINTER STORM	DR-1677-OK	2007	Severe Storm	
OK	SEVERE WINTER STORMS	DR-1678-OK	2007	Severe Storm	
FL	SEVERE STORMS AND TORNADOES	DR-1679-FL	2007	Severe Storm	
FL	SEVERE STORMS, TORNADOES, AND FLOODING	DR-1680-FL	2007	Severe Storm	
IL	SEVERE WINTER STORM	DR-1681-IL	2007	Severe Ice Storm	
WA	SEVERE WINTER STORM, LANDSLIDES, AND MUDSLIDES	DR-1682-WA	2007	Severe Storm	
OR	SEVERE WINTER STORM AND FLOODING	DR-1683-OR	2007	Severe Storm	
PA	SEVERE STORMS AND FLOODING	DR-1684-PA	2007	Severe Storm	
LA	SEVERE STORMS AND TORNADOES	DR-1685-LA	2007	Severe Storm	
GA	SEVERE STORMS AND TORNADOES	DR-1686-GA	2007	Severe Storm	
AL	SEVERE STORMS AND TORNADOES	DR-1687-AL	2007	Severe Storm	
IA	SEVERE WINTER STORMS	DR-1688-IA	2007	Severe Storm	
CA	SEVERE FREEZE	DR-1689-CA	2007	Freezing	
NM	SEVERE STORMS AND TORNADOES	DR-1690-NM	2007	Severe Storm	
ME	FLOODING	DR-1691-ME	2007	Flood	
NY	SEVERE STORMS AND INLAND AND COASTAL FLOODING	DR-1692-NY	2007	Severe Storm	
ME	SEVERE STORMS AND INLAND AND COASTAL FLOODING	DR-1693-ME	2007	Severe Storm	
NJ	SEVERE STORMS AND INLAND AND COASTAL FLOODING	DR-1694-NJ	2007	Severe Storm	
NH	SEVERE STORMS AND FLOODING	DR-1695-NH	2007	Severe Storm	
WV	SEVERE STORMS, FLOODING, LANDSLIDES, AND MUDSLIDES	DR-1696-WV	2007	Severe Storm	
TX	SEVERE STORMS AND TORNADOES	DR-1697-TX	2007	Severe Storm	
VT	SEVERE STORMS AND FLOODING	DR-1698-VT	2007	Severe Storm	
KS	SEVERE STORMS, TORNADOES, AND FLOODING	DR-1699-KS	2007	Severe Storm	
CT	SEVERE STORMS AND FLOODING	DR-1700-CT	2007	Severe Storm	
MA	SEVERE STORMS AND INLAND AND COASTAL FLOODING	DR-1701-MA	2007	Severe Storm	
SD	SEVERE STORMS, TORNADOES, AND FLOODING	DR-1702-SD	2007	Severe Storm	
KY	SEVERE STORMS, FLOODING, MUDSLIDES, AND ROCKSLIDES	DR-1703-KY	2007	Severe Storm	
RI	SEVERE STORMS AND INLAND AND COASTAL FLOODING	DR-1704-RI	2007	Severe Storm	
IA	SEVERE STORMS, FLOODING, AND TORNADOES	DR-1705-IA	2007	Severe Storm	
NE	SEVERE STORMS, FLOODING, AND TORNADOES	DR-1706-NE	2007	Severe Storm	
OK	SEVERE STORMS, TORNADOES AND FLOODING	DR-1707-OK	2007	Severe Storm	
MO	SEVERE STORMS AND FLOODING	DR-1708-MO	2007	Severe Storm	
TX	SEVERE STORMS, TORNADOES, AND FLOODING	DR-1709-TX	2007	Severe Storm	
NY	SEVERE STORMS AND FLOODING	DR-1710-NY	2007	Severe Storm	
KS	SEVERE STORMS AND FLOODING	DR-1711-KS	2007	Severe Storm	
OK	SEVERE STORMS, FLOODING, AND TORNADOES	DR-1712-OK	2007	Severe Storm	
ND	SEVERE STORMS AND FLOODING	DR-1713-ND	2007	Severe Storm	
NE	SEVERE STORMS AND FLOODING	DR-1714-NE	2007	Severe Storm	
VT	SEVERE STORMS AND FLOODING	DR-1715-VT	2007	Severe Storm	
ME	SEVERE STORMS AND FLOODING	DR-1716-ME	2007	Severe Storm	
MN	SEVERE STORMS AND FLOODING	DR-1717-MN	2007	Severe Storm	
OK	SEVERE STORMS, TORNADOES, AND FLOODING	DR-1718-OK	2007	Severe Storm	
WI	SEVERE STORMS AND FLOODING	DR-1719-WI	2007	Severe Storm	
OH	SEVERE STORMS, FLOODING, AND TORNADOES	DR-1720-OH	2007	Severe Storm	
NE	SEVERE STORMS AND FLOODING	DR-1721-NE	2007	Severe Storm	
IL	SEVERE STORMS AND FLOODING	DR-1722-IL	2007	Severe Storm	
OK	SEVERE STORMS, FLOODING, AND TORNADOES	DR-1723-OK	2007	Severe Storm	
NY	SEVERE STORMS, FLOODING, AND TORNADO	DR-1724-NY	2007	Severe Storm	
ND	SEVERE STORMS AND TORNADOES	DR-1725-ND	2007	Severe Storm	
ND	SEVERE STORMS AND TORNADOES	DR-1726-ND	2007	Severe Storm	
IA	SEVERE STORMS AND FLOODING	DR-1727-IA	2007	Severe Storm	
MO	SEVERE STORMS AND FLOODING	DR-1728-MO	2007	Severe Storm	
IL	SEVERE STORMS AND FLOODING	DR-1729-IL	2007	Severe Storm	
NC	HURRICANE OPHELIA	DR-1608-NC	2006	Hurricane	
FL	HURRICANE WILMA	DR-1609-FL	2006	Hurricane	
NH	SEVERE STORMS AND FLOODING	DR-1610-NH	2006	Severe Storm	
MP	TYPHOON NABI	DR-1611-MP	2006	Typhoon	
IN	TORNADO AND SEVERE STORMS	DR-1612-IN	2006	Tornado	
PR	SEVERE STORMS, FLOODING, LANDSLIDES, AND MUDSLIDES	DR-1613-PR	2006	Severe Storm	
MA	SEVERE STORMS AND FLOODING	DR-1614-MA	2006	Severe Storm	
KS	SEVERE STORMS AND FLOODING	DR-1615-KS	2006	Severe Storm	
ND	SEVERE WINTER STORM AND RECORD AND/OR NEAR RECORD SNOW	DR-1616-ND	2006	Snowstorm	
KY	SEVERE STORMS AND TORNADOES	DR-1617-KY	2006	Severe Storm	
AK	SEVERE FALL STORM, TIDAL SURGES, AND FLOODING	DR-1618-AK	2006	Severe Storm	
CT	SEVERE STORMS AND FLOODING	DR-1619-CT	2006	Severe Storm	
SD	SEVERE WINTER STORM	DR-1620-SD	2006	Severe Storm	
ND	SEVERE WINTER STORM	DR-1621-ND	2006	Severe Storm	
MN	SEVERE WINTER STORM	DR-1622-MN	2006	Severe Storm	
OK	EXTREME WILDFIRE THREAT	DR-1623-OK	2006	Fire	
TX	EXTREME WILDFIRE THREAT	DR-1624-TX	2006	Fire	
SC	SEVERE ICE STORM	DR-1625-SC	2006	Severe Ice Storm	
KS	SEVERE WINTER STORM	DR-1626-KS	2006	Severe Storm	
NE	SEVERE WINTER STORM	DR-1627-NE	2006	Severe Storm	
CA	SEVERE STORMS, FLOODING, MUDSLIDES, AND LANDSLIDES	DR-1628-CA	2006	Severe Storm	
NV	SEVERE STORMS AND FLOODING	DR-1629-NV	2006	Severe Storm	
ID	SEVERE STORMS AND FLOODING	DR-1630-ID	2006	Severe Storm	
MO	SEVERE STORMS, TORNADOES AND FLOODING	DR-1631-MO	2006	Severe Storm	
OR	SEVERE STORMS, FLOODING, LANDSLIDES, AND MUDSLIDES	DR-1632-OR	2006	Severe Storm	
IL	TORNADOES AND SEVERE STORMS	DR-1633-IL	2006	Severe Storm	
TN	SEVERE STORMS AND TORNADOES	DR-1634-TN	2006	Severe Storm	
MO	SEVERE STORMS, TORNADOES, AND FLOODING	DR-1635-MO	2006	Severe Storm	
AR	SEVERE STORMS AND TORNADOES	DR-1636-AR	2006	Severe Storm	
OK	SEVERE STORMS AND TORNADOES	DR-1637-OK	2006	Severe Storm	
KS	SEVERE STORMS, TORNADOES, AND STRAIGHT LINE WINDS	DR-1638-KS	2006	Severe Storm	
HI	SEVERE STORMS, FLOODING, LANDSLIDES, AND MUDSLIDES	DR-1640-HI	2006	Severe Storm	
WA	SEVERE STORMS, FLOODING, TIDAL SURGE, LANDSLIDES, AND MUDSLIDES	DR-1641-WA	2006	Severe Storm	
MA	SEVERE STORMS AND FLOODING	DR-1642-MA	2006	Severe Storm	
NH	SEVERE STORMS AND FLOODING	DR-1643-NH	2006	Severe Storm	
ME	SEVERE STORMS AND FLOODING	DR-1644-ME	2006	Severe Storm	
ND	SEVERE STORMS, FLOODING, AND GROUND SATURATION	DR-1645-ND	2006	Severe Storm	
CA	SEVERE STORMS, FLOODING, LANDSLIDES, AND MUDSLIDES	DR-1646-CA	2006	Severe Storm	
SD	SEVERE WINTER STORM	DR-1647-SD	2006	Severe Storm	
MN	FLOODING	DR-1648-MN	2006	Flood	
PA	SEVERE STORMS, FLOODING, AND MUDSLIDES	DR-1649-PA	2006	Severe Storm	
NY	SEVERE STORMS AND FLOODING	DR-1650-NY	2006	Severe Storm	
OH	SEVERE STORMS, TORNADOES, STRAIGHT LINE WINDS, AND FLOODING	DR-1651-OH	2006	Severe Storm	
MD	SEVERE STORMS, FLOODING, AND TORNADOES	DR-1652-MD	2006	Severe Storm	
NJ	SEVERE STORMS AND FLOODING	DR-1653-NJ	2006	Severe Storm	
DE	SEVERE STORMS AND FLOODING	DR-1654-DE	2006	Severe Storm	
VA	SEVERE STORMS, TORNADOES, AND FLOODING	DR-1655-VA	2006	Severe Storm	
OH	SEVERE STORMS, STRAIGHT LINE WINDS, AND FLOODING	DR-1656-OH	2006	Severe Storm	
AK	SNOW MELT AND ICE JAM FLOODING	DR-1657-AK	2006	Flood	
TX	SEVERE STORMS AND FLOODING	DR-1658-TX	2006	Severe Storm	
NM	SEVERE STORMS AND FLOODING	DR-1659-NM	2006	Severe Storm	
AZ	SEVERE STORMS AND FLOODING	DR-1660-AZ	2006	Severe Storm	
VA	TROPICAL DEPRESSION ERNESTO, SEVERE STORMS AND FLOODING	DR-1661-VA	2006	Severe Storm	
NJ	SEVERE STORMS AND FLOODING	DR-1563-NJ	2005	Severe Storm	
NY	SEVERE STORMS AND FLOODING	DR-1564-NY	2005	Severe Storm	
NY	TROPICAL DEPRESSION IVAN	DR-1565-NY	2005	Severe Storm	
SC	TROPICAL STORM FRANCES	DR-1566-SC	2005	Hurricane	
VI	TROPICAL STORM JEANNE	DR-1567-VI	2005	Hurricane	
TN	SEVERE STORMS AND FLOODING	DR-1568-TN	2005	Severe Storm	
MN	SEVERE STORMS AND FLOODING	DR-1569-MN	2005	Severe Storm	
VA	SEVERE STORMS AND FLOODING FROM THE REMNANTS OF HURRICANE JEANNE	DR-1570-VA	2005	Severe Storm	
AK	SEVERE WINTER STORM, TIDAL SURGES AND FLOODING	DR-1571-AK	2005	Severe Storm	
DE	SEVERE STORMS, TORNADOES, AND FLOODING FROM THE REMNANTS OF	DR-1572-DE	2005	Severe Storm	
IN	SEVERE WINTER STORMS AND FLOODING	DR-1573-IN	2005	Severe Storm	
WV	SEVERE STORMS, FLOODING, AND LANDSLIDES	DR-1574-WV	2005	Severe Storm	
HI	SEVERE STORMS AND FLASH FLOODING	DR-1575-HI	2005	Severe Storm	
UT	SEVERE STORMS AND FLOODING	DR-1576-UT	2005	Severe Storm	
CA	SEVERE STORMS, FLOODING, DEBRIS FLOWS, AND MUDSLIDES	DR-1577-CA	2005	Severe Storm	
KY	SEVERE WINTER STORM AND RECORD SNOW	DR-1578-KY	2005	Snowstorm	
KS	SEVERE WINTER STORMS, HEAVY RAINS, AND FLOODING	DR-1579-KS	2005	Severe Storm	
OH	SEVERE WINTER STORMS, FLOODING, AND MUDSLIDES	DR-1580-OH	2005	Severe Storm	
AZ	SEVERE STORMS AND FLOODING	DR-1581-AZ	2005	Severe Storm	
AS	TC OLAF, INCLUD. HIGH WINDS AND SURF AND HEAVY RAINFALL	DR-1582-AS	2005	Typhoon	
NV	HEAVY RAINS AND FLOODING	DR-1583-NV	2005	Severe Storm	
AK	SEVERE WINTER STORM	DR-1584-AK	2005	Severe Storm	
CA	SEVERE STORMS, FLOODING, LANDSLIDES, AND MUD AND DEBRIS FLOWS	DR-1585-CA	2005	Severe Storm	
AZ	SEVERE STORMS AND FLOODING	DR-1586-AZ	2005	Severe Storm	
PA	SEVERE STORMS AND FLOODING	DR-1587-PA	2005	Severe Storm	
NJ	SEVERE STORMS AND FLOODING	DR-1588-NJ	2005	Severe Storm	
NY	SEVERE STORMS AND FLOODING	DR-1589-NY	2005	Severe Storm	
NE	SEVERE STORMS AND FLOODING	DR-1590-NE	2005	Severe Storm	
ME	SEVERE STORMS, FLOODING, SNOW MELT, AND ICE JAMS	DR-1591-ME	2005	Severe Storm	
ID	HEAVY RAINS AND FLOODING	DR-1592-ID	2005	Flood	
AL	HURRICANE DENNIS	DR-1593-AL	2005	Hurricane	
MS	HURRICANE DENNIS	DR-1594-MS	2005	Hurricane	
FL	HURRICANE DENNIS	DR-1595-FL	2005	Hurricane	
SD	SEVERE STORM	DR-1596-SD	2005	Severe Storm	
ND	SEVERE STORMS, FLOODING, AND GROUND SATURATION	DR-1597-ND	2005	Severe Storm	
UT	FLOODING AND LANDSLIDES	DR-1598-UT	2005	Flood	
WY	TORNADO	DR-1599-WY	2005	Tornado	
KS	SEVERE STORMS AND FLOODING	DR-1600-KS	2005	Severe Storm	
LA	TROPICAL STORM CINDY	DR-1601-LA	2005	Severe Storm	
FL	HURRICANE KATRINA	DR-1602-FL	2005	Hurricane	
LA	HURRICANE KATRINA	DR-1603-LA	2005	Hurricane	
MS	HURRICANE KATRINA	DR-1604-MS	2005	Hurricane	
AL	HURRICANE KATRINA	DR-1605-AL	2005	Hurricane	
TX	HURRICANE RITA	DR-1606-TX	2005	Hurricane	
LA	HURRICANE RITA	DR-1607-LA	2005	Hurricane	

=== 2000 - 2005 ===
State	Name	FEMA disaster code	Year declared	Disaster type	Notes
CA	WILDFIRES, FLOODING, MUDFLOW AND DEBRIS FLOW DIRECTLY RELATED T	DR-1498-CA	2004	Fire	
WA	SEVERE STORMS AND FLOODING	DR-1499-WA	2004	Severe Storm	
WV	SEVERE STORMS, FLOODING, AND LANDSLIDES	DR-1500-WV	2004	Severe Storm	
PR	SEVERE STORMS, FLOODING, MUDSLIDES, AND LANDSLIDES	DR-1501-PR	2004	Severe Storm	
VA	SEVERE STORMS AND FLOODING	DR-1502-VA	2004	Severe Storm	
VI	SEVERE STORMS, FLOODING, LANDSLIDES, AND MUDSLIDES	DR-1503-VI	2004	Severe Storm	
FM	TYPHOON LUPIT	DR-1504-FM	2004	Typhoon	
CA	EARTHQUAKE	DR-1505-CA	2004	Earthquake	
AS	HIGH WINDS, HIGH SURF, AND HEAVY RAINFALL ASSOCIATED WITH TROPCIAL CYCLONE HETA	DR-1506-AS	2004	Typhoon	
OH	SEVERE STORMS, FLOODING, MUDSLIDES, AND LANDSLIDES	DR-1507-OH	2004	Severe Storm	
ME	SEVERE STORMS, FLOODING, SNOW MELT AND ICE JAMS	DR-1508-ME	2004	Severe Storm	
SC	SEVERE ICE STORM	DR-1509-SC	2004	Severe Ice Storm	
OR	SEVERE WINTER STORMS	DR-1510-OR	2004	Severe Storm	
FM	TYPHOON SUDAL	DR-1511-FM	2004	Typhoon	
MA	FLOODING	DR-1512-MA	2004	Flood	
IL	SEVERE STORMS AND TORNADOES	DR-1513-IL	2004	Severe Storm	
NM	SEVERE STORMS AND FLOODING	DR-1514-NM	2004	Severe Storm	
ND	SEVERE STORMS, FLOODING, AND GROUND SATURATION	DR-1515-ND	2004	Severe Storm	
AR	SEVER STORMS, FLOODING AND LANDSLIDES	DR-1516-AR	2004	Severe Storm	
NE	SEVERE STORMS, TORNADOES AND FLOODING	DR-1517-NE	2004	Severe Storm	
IA	SEVERE STORMS, TORNADOES, AND FLOODING	DR-1518-IA	2004	Severe Storm	
OH	SEVERE STORMS AND FLOODING	DR-1519-OH	2004	Severe Storm	
IN	SEVERE STORMS, TORNADOES, AND FLOODING	DR-1520-IN	2004	Severe Storm	
LA	SEVERE STORMS AND FLOODING	DR-1521-LA	2004	Severe Storm	
WV	SEVERE STORMS, FLOODING, AND LANDSLIDES	DR-1522-WV	2004	Severe Storm	
KY	SEVERE STORMS, TORNADOES, FLOODING, AND MUDSLIDES	DR-1523-KY	2004	Severe Storm	
MO	SEVERE STORMS, TORNADOES, AND FLOODING	DR-1524-MO	2004	Severe Storm	
VA	SEVERE STORMS, TORNADOES, AND FLOODING	DR-1525-VA	2004	Severe Storm	
WI	SEVERE STORMS AND FLOODING	DR-1526-WI	2004	Severe Storm	
MI	SEVERE STORMS, TORNADOES, AND FLOODING	DR-1527-MI	2004	Severe Storm	
AR	SEVERE STORMS AND FLOODING	DR-1528-AR	2004	Severe Storm	
CA	FLOODING AS A RESULT OF A LEVEE BREAK	DR-1529-CA	2004	Dam/Levee Break	
NJ	SEVERE STORMS AND FLOODING	DR-1530-NJ	2004	Severe Storm	
SD	SEVERE STORMS AND FLOODING	DR-1531-SD	2004	Severe Storm	
MP	FLOODING, HIGH SURF, HIGH WINDS, AND WIND-DRIVEN RAIN ASSOCIATED W TYPH TINGTING	DR-1532-MP	2004	Typhoon	
GU	HIGH WINDS, FLOODING, AND MUDSLIDES AS A RESULT OF TROPICAL STORM TINGTING	DR-1533-GU	2004	Severe Storm	
NY	SEVERE STORMS AND FLOODING	DR-1534-NY	2004	Severe Storm	
KS	SEVERE STORMS, FLOODING, AND TORNADOES	DR-1535-KS	2004	Severe Storm	
WV	SEVERE STORMS, FLOODING, AND LANDSLIDES	DR-1536-WV	2004	Severe Storm	
KY	SEVERE STORMS AND FLOODING	DR-1537-KY	2004	Severe Storm	
PA	SEVERE STORMS AND FLOODING	DR-1538-PA	2004	Severe Storm	
FL	TROPICAL STORM BONNIE AND HURRICANE CHARLEY	DR-1539-FL	2004	Hurricane	
NV	WILDLAND FIRE	DR-1540-NV	2004	Fire	
MP	FLOODING, HIGH SURF, STORM SURGE, AND HIGH WINDS AS A RESULT OF SUPER TYPHOON CH	DR-1541-MP	2004	Typhoon	
IN	SEVERE STORMS, TORNADOES AND FLOODING	DR-1542-IN	2004	Severe Storm	
SC	HURRICANE CHARLEY	DR-1543-SC	2004	Hurricane	
VA	SEVERE STORMS, FLOODING AND TORNADOES ASSOCIATED W TD GASTON	DR-1544-VA	2004	Severe Storm	
FL	HURRICANE FRANCES	DR-1545-FL	2004	Hurricane	
NC	TROPICAL STORM FRANCES	DR-1546-NC	2004	Hurricane	
SC	TROPICAL STORM GASTON	DR-1547-SC	2004	Severe Storm	
LA	HURRICANE IVAN	DR-1548-LA	2004	Hurricane	
AL	HURRICANE IVAN	DR-1549-AL	2004	Hurricane	
MS	HURRICANE IVAN	DR-1550-MS	2004	Hurricane	
FL	HURRICANE IVAN	DR-1551-FL	2004	Hurricane	
PR	TROPICAL STORM JEANNE AND RESULTING LANDSLIDES AND MUDSLIDES	DR-1552-PR	2004	Severe Storm	
NC	HURRICANE IVAN	DR-1553-NC	2004	Hurricane	
GA	HURRICANE IVAN	DR-1554-GA	2004	Hurricane	
PA	SEVERE STORMS AND FLOODING ASSOCIATED WITH TROPICAL DEPRESSION FRANCES	DR-1555-PA	2004	Severe Storm	
OH	SEVERE STORMS AND FLOODING	DR-1556-OH	2004	Severe Storm	
PA	TROPICAL DEPRESSION IVAN	DR-1557-PA	2004	Hurricane	
WV	SEVERE STORMS, FLOODING, AND LANDSLIDES	DR-1558-WV	2004	Severe Storm	
VT	SEVERE STORMS AND FLOODING	DR-1559-VT	2004	Severe Storm	
GA	TROPICAL STORM FRANCES	DR-1560-GA	2004	Hurricane	
FL	HURRICANE JEANNE	DR-1561-FL	2004	Hurricane	
KS	SEVERE STORMS, FLOODING, AND TORNADOES	DR-1562-KS	2004	Severe Storm	
MS	TROPICAL STORM ISIDORE	DR-1436-MS	2003	Hurricane	
LA	HURRICANE LILI	DR-1437-LA	2003	Hurricane	
AL	TROPICAL STORM ISIDORE	DR-1438-AL	2003	Hurricane	
TX	SEVERE STORMS, TORNADOES AND FLOODING	DR-1439-TX	2003	Severe Storm	
AK	EARTHQUAKE	DR-1440-AK	2003	Earthquake	
TN	SEVERE STORMS AND TORNADOS	DR-1441-TN	2003	Severe Storm	
AL	SEVERE STORMS AND TORNADOES	DR-1442-AL	2003	Severe Storm	
MS	SEVERE STORMS AND TORNADOES	DR-1443-MS	2003	Severe Storm	
OH	SEVERE STORMS AND TORNADOES	DR-1444-OH	2003	Severe Storm	
AK	SEVERE WINTER STORMS, FLOODING, COASTAL EROSION AND TIDAL SURGE	DR-1445-AK	2003	Severe Storm	
GU	SUPER TYPHOON PONGSONA	DR-1446-GU	2003	Typhoon	
MP	SUPER TYPHOON PONGSONA	DR-1447-MP	2003	Typhoon	
NC	SEVERE ICE STORM	DR-1448-NC	2003	Severe Ice Storm	
FM	TYPHOON PONGSONA	DR-1449-FM	2003	Typhoon	
AR	SEVERE ICE STORM	DR-1450-AR	2003	Severe Ice Storm	
SC	SEVERE ICE STORM	DR-1451-SC	2003	Severe Ice Storm	
OK	SEVERE ICE STORM	DR-1452-OK	2003	Severe Ice Storm	
OH	SEVERE WINTER STORM AND RECORD/NEAR RECORD SNOW	DR-1453-OH	2003	Severe Storm	
KY	SEVERE WINTER ICE AND SNOW STORMS, HEAVY RAIN, FLOODING, TORNADOES, AND MUD AND	DR-1454-KY	2003	Severe Storm	
WV	SEVERE WINTER STORM, RECORD/NEAR RECORD SNOW, HEAVY RAINS, FLOODING AND LANDSLIDES	DR-1455-WV	2003	Severe Storm	
TN	SEVERE STORMS AND FLOODING	DR-1456-TN	2003	Severe Storm	
NC	ICE STORM	DR-1457-NC	2003	Severe Ice Storm	
VA	SEVERE WINTER STORM, RECORD/NEAR RECORD SNOWFALL, HEAVY RAIN,FLOODIND, AND MUDSLIDE	DR-1458-VA	2003	Severe Storm	
MS	SEVERE STORMS, TORNADOES, FLOODS	DR-1459-MS	2003	Severe Storm	
FL	SEVERE STORMS AND TORNADOES	DR-1460-FL	2003	Severe Storm	
AK	SEVERE WINTER STORM, INCLUDING HIGH WINDS AND FREEZING TEMPERATURES	DR-1461-AK	2003	Severe Storm	
KS	SEVERE STORMS, TORNADOES, AND FLOODING	DR-1462-KS	2003	Severe Storm	
MO	SEVERE STORMS, TORNADOES, AND FLOODING	DR-1463-MO	2003	Severe Storm	
TN	SEVERE STORMS, TORNADOES, AND FLOODING	DR-1464-TN	2003	Severe Storm	
OK	SEVERE STORMS AND TORNADOES	DR-1465-OK	2003	Severe Storm	
AL	SEVERE STORMS, TORNADOES, AND FLOODING	DR-1466-AL	2003	Severe Storm	
NY	ICE STORM	DR-1467-NY	2003	Severe Ice Storm	
ME	SEVERE WINTER COLD AND FROST	DR-1468-ME	2003	Freezing	
IL	SEVERE STORMS, TORNADOES, AND FLOODING	DR-1469-IL	2003	Severe Storm	
MS	SEVERE STORMS, TORNADOES AND HIGH WINDS	DR-1470-MS	2003	Severe Storm	
KY	SEVERE STORMS, FLOODING, MUD AND ROCK SLIDES, AND TORNADOES	DR-1471-KY	2003	Severe Storm	
AR	SEVERE STORMS, TORNADOES, AND FLOODING	DR-1472-AR	2003	Severe Storm	
AS	HEAVY RAINFALL, FLOODING, LANDSLIDES, AND MUDSLIDES	DR-1473-AS	2003	Severe Storm	
WV	SEVERE STORMS, FLOODING, AND LANDSLIDES	DR-1474-WV	2003	Severe Storm	
KY	SEVERE STORMS, FLOODING, MUD AND ROCK SLIDES, AND TORNADOES	DR-1475-KY	2003	Severe Storm	
IN	SEVERE STORMS, TORNADOES, AND FLOODING	DR-1476-IN	2003	Severe Storm	
AZ	ASPEN FIRE	DR-1477-AZ	2003	Fire	
OH	SEVERE STORMS AND FLOODING	DR-1478-OH	2003	Severe Storm	
TX	HURRICANE CLAUDETTE	DR-1479-TX	2003	Hurricane	
NE	SEVERE STORMS AND TORNADOES	DR-1480-NE	2003	Severe Storm	
FL	SEVERE STORMS AND FLOODING	DR-1481-FL	2003	Severe Storm	
TN	SEVERE STORMS, HIGH WINDS, AND HEAVY RAIN	DR-1482-TN	2003	Severe Storm	
ND	SEVERE STORMS AND HIGH WINDS	DR-1483-ND	2003	Severe Storm	
OH	TORNADOES, FLOODING, SEVERE STORMS, AND HIGH WINDS	DR-1484-OH	2003	Tornado	
PA	SEVERE STORMS, TORNADOES, AND FLOODING	DR-1485-PA	2003	Severe Storm	
NY	SEVERE STORMS, FLOODING, AND TORNADOES	DR-1486-NY	2003	Severe Storm	
IN	SEVERE STORMS, TORNADOES, AND FLOODING	DR-1487-IN	2003	Severe Storm	
VT	SEVERE STORMS AND FLOODING	DR-1488-VT	2003	Severe Storm	
NH	SEVERE STORMS AND FLOODING	DR-1489-NH	2003	Severe Storm	
NC	HURRICANE ISABEL	DR-1490-NC	2003	Hurricane	
VA	HURRICANE ISABEL	DR-1491-VA	2003	Hurricane	
MD	HURRICANE ISABEL	DR-1492-MD	2003	Hurricane	
DC	HURRICANE ISABEL	DR-1493-DC	2003	Hurricane	
DE	HURRICANE ISABEL	DR-1494-DE	2003	Hurricane	
DE	TROPICAL STORM HENRI	DR-1495-DE	2003	Hurricane	
WV	HURRICANE ISABEL	DR-1496-WV	2003	Hurricane	
PA	TROPICAL STORMS HENRI AND ISABEL AND RELATED SEVERE STORMS AND FLOODING	DR-1497-PA	2003	Severe Storm	
NE	SEVERE STORMS AND A TORNADO	DR-1394-NE	2002	Severe Storm	
OK	SEVERE STORMS, FLOODING, AND TORNADOES	DR-1395-OK	2002	Severe Storm	
PR	SEVERE STORMS, FLOODING, MUDSLIDES AND LANDSLIDES	DR-1396-PR	2002	Severe Storm	
GU	EARTHQUAKE	DR-1397-GU	2002	Earthquake	
MS	SEVERE STORMS, TORNADOES AND FLOODING	DR-1398-MS	2002	Severe Storm	
AL	SEVERE STORMS AND TORNADOES	DR-1399-AL	2002	Severe Storm	
AR	SEVERE STORMS AND FLOODING	DR-1400-AR	2002	Severe Storm	
OK	SEVERE WINTER ICE STORM	DR-1401-OK	2002	Severe Ice Storm	
KS	SEVERE WINTER ICE STORM	DR-1402-KS	2002	Severe Ice Storm	
MO	SEVERE WINTER ICE STORM	DR-1403-MO	2002	Severe Ice Storm	
NY	SEVERE WINTER STORM	DR-1404-NY	2002	Snowstorm	
OR	SEVERE WINTER STORM WITH HIGH WINDS	DR-1405-OR	2002	Severe Storm	
VA	SEVERE STORMS AND FLOODING	DR-1406-VA	2002	Severe Storm	
KY	SEVERE STORMS AND FLOODING	DR-1407-KY	2002	Severe Storm	
TN	SEVERE STORMS AND FLOODING	DR-1408-TN	2002	Severe Storm	
MD	TORNADO	DR-1409-MD	2002	Tornado	
WV	SEVERE STORMS, FLOODING AND LANDSLIDES	DR-1410-WV	2002	Severe Storm	
VA	SEVERE STORMS, TORNADOES, AND FLOODING	DR-1411-VA	2002	Severe Storm	
MO	SEVERE STORMS, TORNADOES AND FLOODING	DR-1412-MO	2002	Severe Storm	
MI	FLOODING	DR-1413-MI	2002	Flood	
KY	SEVERE STORMS, TORNADOES AND FLOODING	DR-1414-KY	2002	Severe Storm	
NY	EARTHQUAKE	DR-1415-NY	2002	Earthquake	
IL	SEVERE STORMS, TORNADOES AND FLOODING	DR-1416-IL	2002	Tornado	
FM	TYPHOON MITAG	DR-1417-FM	2002	Typhoon	
IN	SEVERE STORMS, TORNADOES AND FLOODING	DR-1418-IN	2002	Severe Storm	
MN	SEVERE STORMS, FLOODING AND TORNADOES	DR-1419-MN	2002	Severe Storm	
IA	SEVERE STORMS AND FLOODING	DR-1420-IA	2002	Flood	
CO	WILDFIRES	DR-1421-CO	2002	Fire	
AZ	WILDFIRES	DR-1422-AZ	2002	Fire	
AK	FLOODING	DR-1423-AK	2002	Flood	
MT	SEVERE STORMS AND FLOODING	DR-1424-MT	2002	Severe Storm	
TX	SEVERE STORMS AND FLOODING	DR-1425-TX	2002	Flood	
GU	TYPHOON CHATA'AN	DR-1426-GU	2002	Typhoon	
FM	TS CHATA'AN, INC FLOODING, MUDSLIDES AND LANDSLIDES	DR-1427-FM	2002	Typhoon	
VT	SEVERE STORMS AND FLOODING	DR-1428-VT	2002	Severe Storm	
WI	SEVERE STORMS AND FLOODING	DR-1429-WI	2002	Severe Storm	
MP	TYPHOON CHATA'AN	DR-1430-MP	2002	Typhoon	
ND	SEVERE STORMS, FLOODING AND TORNADOES	DR-1431-ND	2002	Severe Storm	
WI	SEVERE STORMS, TORNADOES AND FLOODING	DR-1432-WI	2002	Tornado	
IN	SEVERE STORMS AND TORNADOES	DR-1433-IN	2002	Severe Storm	
TX	TROPICAL STORM FAY	DR-1434-TX	2002	Coastal Storm	
LA	TROPICAL STORM ISIDORE	DR-1435-LA	2002	Hurricane	
FL	TROPICAL STORM HELENE	DR-1344-FL	2001	Severe Storm	
FL	SEVERE STORMS AND FLOODING	DR-1345-FL	2001	Severe Storm	
MI	SEVERE STORMS AND FLOODING	DR-1346-MI	2001	Severe Storm	
AZ	SEVERE STORMS AND FLOODING	DR-1347-AZ	2001	Severe Storm	
HI	SEVERE STORMS AND FLOODING	DR-1348-HI	2001	Severe Storm	
OK	SEVERE STORMS AND FLOODING	DR-1349-OK	2001	Severe Storm	
MT	SEVERE WINTER STORMS	DR-1350-MT	2001	Severe Storm	
WY	SEVERE WINTER STORM	DR-1351-WY	2001	Severe Storm	
AL	SEVERE STORMS AND TORNADOES	DR-1352-AL	2001	Severe Storm	
ND	SEVERE WINTER STORMS AND TORNADOES	DR-1353-ND	2001	Tornado	
AR	SEVERE WINTER ICE STORM	DR-1354-AR	2001	Severe Ice Storm	
OK	SEVERE WINTER ICE STORM	DR-1355-OK	2001	Severe Ice Storm	
TX	SEVERE WINTER ICE STORM	DR-1356-TX	2001	Severe Ice Storm	
LA	SEVERE WINTER ICE STORM	DR-1357-LA	2001	Severe Ice Storm	
VT	SEVERE STORMS AND FLOODING	DR-1358-VT	2001	Severe Storm	
FL	SEVERE FREEZE	DR-1359-FL	2001	Freezing	
MS	SEVERE STORMS AND TORNADOES	DR-1360-MS	2001	Severe Storm	
WA	EARTHQUAKE	DR-1361-WA	2001	Earthquake	
AL	SEVERE STORMS AND FLOODING	DR-1362-AL	2001	Severe Storm	
AR	SEVERE STORMS AND FLOODING	DR-1363-AR	2001	Severe Storm	
MA	SEVERE STORMS AND FLOODING	DR-1364-MA	2001	Severe Storm	
MS	SEVERE STORMS AND FLOODING	DR-1365-MS	2001	Severe Storm	
KS	SEVERE STORMS, HAIL, FLOODING AND TORNADOES	DR-1366-KS	2001	Severe Storm	
IA	SEVERE STORMS, TORNADOES AND FLOODING	DR-1367-IA	2001	Severe Storm	
IL	FLOODING	DR-1368-IL	2001	Flood	
WI	FLOODING, SEVERE STORMS AND TORNADOES	DR-1369-WI	2001	Flood	
MN	SEVERE WINTER STORMS, FLOODING, AND TORNADOES	DR-1370-MN	2001	Flood	
ME	SEVERE WINTER STORMS AND FLOODING	DR-1371-ME	2001	Severe Storm	
PR	SEVERE STORMS, FLOODING AND MUDSLIDES	DR-1372-PR	2001	Severe Storm	
NE	SEVERE WINTER STORMS, FLOODING AND TORNADOES	DR-1373-NE	2001	Severe Storm	
CO	SEVERE WINTER STORMS	DR-1374-CO	2001	Severe Storm	
SD	SEVERE WINTER STORMS, FLOODING, AND ICE JAMS	DR-1375-SD	2001	Flood	
ND	SEVERE STORMS, FLOODING, & GROUND SATURATION	DR-1376-ND	2001	Flood	
MT	SEVERE WINTER STORMS	DR-1377-MT	2001	Severe Storm	
WV	SEVERE STORMS, FLOODING AND LANDSLIDES	DR-1378-WV	2001	Severe Storm	
TX	TX-TROPICAL STORM ALLISON-06-06-2001	DR-1379-TX	2001	Coastal Storm	
LA	TROPICAL STORM ALLISON	DR-1380-LA	2001	Coastal Storm	
FL	TROPICAL STORM ALLISON	DR-1381-FL	2001	Severe Storm	
MS	TROPICAL STORM ALLISON	DR-1382-MS	2001	Severe Storm	
PA	TROPICAL STORM ALLISON	DR-1383-PA	2001	Severe Storm	
OK	SEVERE STORMS, FLOODING, AND TORNADOES	DR-1384-OK	2001	Severe Storm	
MT	SEVERE WINTER STORMS	DR-1385-MT	2001	Severe Storm	
VA	SEVERE STORMS AND FLOODING	DR-1386-VA	2001	Severe Storm	
TN	SEVERE STORMS AND FLOODING	DR-1387-TN	2001	Severe Storm	
KY	SEVERE STORMS AND FLOODING	DR-1388-KY	2001	Severe Storm	
DC	SEVERE STORMS, FLOODING AND MUDSLIDES	DR-1389-DC	2001	Severe Storm	
OH	SEVERE STORMS AND FLOODING	DR-1390-OH	2001	Severe Storm	
NY	FIRES AND EXPLOSIONS	DR-1391-NY	2001	Fire	
VA	FIRES AND EXPLOSIONS	DR-1392-VA	2001	Terrorist	
FL	SEVERE STORMS, TORNADOES AND FLOODING ASSOCIATED WITH TROPICAL STORM GABRIELLE	DR-1393-FL	2001	Coastal Storm	
AZ	SEVERE STORMS, FLOODING, HIGH WINDS	DR-1304-AZ	2000	Severe Storm	
NH	TROPICAL STORM FLOYD	DR-1305-NH	2000	Hurricane	
FL	FL-HURRICANE IRENE-DR-REQ	DR-1306-FL	2000	Hurricane	
VT	TROPICAL STORM FLOYD	DR-1307-VT	2000	Severe Storm	
ME	HURRICANE FLOYD MAJOR DISASTER DECLARATIONS	DR-1308-ME	2000	Hurricane	
VI	HURRICANE LENNY MAJOR DECLARATION	DR-1309-VI	2000	Hurricane	
KY	TORNADOES, SEVERE STORMS, TORRENTIAL RAINS, AND FLASH FLOODING	DR-1310-KY	2000	Tornado	
GA	SEVERE WINTER STORM	DR-1311-GA	2000	Severe Storm	
NC	SEVERE WINTER STORM	DR-1312-NC	2000	Severe Storm	
SC	SEVERE WINTER STORM	DR-1313-SC	2000	Severe Storm	
LA	SEVERE WINTER STORM	DR-1314-LA	2000	Snowstorm	
GA	SEVERE STORMS/TORNADOS	DR-1315-GA	2000	Severe Storm	
AK	SEVERE WINTER STORMS AND AVALANCHES	DR-1316-AK	2000	Severe Storm	
AL	SEVERE WINTER STORMS	DR-1317-AL	2000	Severe Storm	
VA	SEVERE WINTER STORMS	DR-1318-VA	2000	Severe Storm	
WV	FLOODING, SEVERE STORMS, AND LANDSLIDES	DR-1319-WV	2000	Flood	
KY	SEVERE STORMS AND FLOODING	DR-1320-KY	2000	Severe Storm	
OH	SEVERE STORMS AND FLOODING	DR-1321-OH	2000	Severe Storm	
AL	SEVERE STORMS AND FLOODING	DR-1322-AL	2000	Severe Storm	
TX	SEVERE STORMS, TORNADOES AND FLOODING	DR-1323-TX	2000	Tornado	
MD	SEVERE WINTER STORM	DR-1324-MD	2000	Severe Storm	
DC	SEVERE WINTER STORM	DR-1325-DC	2000	Severe Storm	
ME	SEVERE STORMS, FLOODING, AND ICE JAMS	DR-1326-ME	2000	Severe Storm	
KS	SEVERE STORMS AND TORNADOES	DR-1327-KS	2000	Severe Storm	
MO	SEVERE THUNDERSTORMS AND FLASH FLOODING	DR-1328-MO	2000	Flood	
NM	SEVERE FOREST FIRE	DR-1329-NM	2000	Fire	
SD	SEVERE WINTER STORM, FLOODING, LANDSLIDES AND MUDSLIDES	DR-1330-SD	2000	Severe Storm	
TN	SEVERE STORMS, TORNADOES, AND FLOODING	DR-1331-TN	2000	Severe Storm	
WI	SEVERE STORMS, TORNADOES, AND FLOODING	DR-1332-WI	2000	Severe Storm	
MN	SEVERE STORMS AND FLOODING	DR-1333-MN	2000	Severe Storm	
ND	SEVERE STORMS, FLOODING AND GROUND SATURATION	DR-1334-ND	2000	Severe Storm	
NY	SEVERE STORMS AND FLOODING	DR-1335-NY	2000	Severe Storm	
VT	SEVERE STORMS AND FLOODING	DR-1336-VT	2000	Severe Storm	
NJ	SEVERE STORMS, FLOODING AND MUDSLIDES	DR-1337-NJ	2000	Severe Storm	
DC	SEVERE THUNDERSTORMS	DR-1338-DC	2000	Severe Storm	
OH	SEVERE STORMS AND FLOODING	DR-1339-OH	2000	Severe Storm	
MT	WILDFIRES	DR-1340-MT	2000	Fire	
ID	WILDFIRES	DR-1341-ID	2000	Fire	
CA	EARTHQUAKE	DR-1342-CA	2000	Earthquake	
OH	SEVERE STORMS AND TORNADO	DR-1343-OH	2000	Severe Storm	

=== 1990 - 2000 ===
State	Name	FEMA disaster code	Year declared	Disaster type	Notes
MS	HURRICANE GEORGES	DR-1251-MS	1999	Hurricane	
WA	WA STORMS & FLOODING 5/26/98	DR-1252-WA	1999	Severe Storm	
MO	SEVERE STORMS, FLOODING AND TORNADOES	DR-1253-MO	1999	Severe Storm	
KS	SEVERE STORMS, FLOODING AND TORNADOES	DR-1254-KS	1999	Severe Storm	
WA	WA LANDSLIDE 3/6/98	DR-1255-WA	1999	Mud/Landslide	
MO	SEVERE STORMS AND FLOODING	DR-1256-MO	1999	Severe Storm	
TX	TX-FLOODING 10/18/98	DR-1257-TX	1999	Flood	
KS	KS-FLOODING 10/31/98	DR-1258-KS	1999	Severe Storm	
FL	TROPICAL STORM MITCH	DR-1259-FL	1999	Severe Storm	
TN	SEVERE WINTER STORM	DR-1260-TN	1999	Severe Storm	
AL	RIV-SEVERE WINTER WX 12/23/98	DR-1261-AL	1999	Severe Storm	
TN	SEVERE STORMS, TORNADOES AND HIGH WINDS	DR-1262-TN	1999	Severe Storm	
ME	ME - FLOODING 10/16/98	DR-1263-ME	1999	Severe Storm	
LA	SEVERE ICE STORM	DR-1264-LA	1999	Severe Storm	
MS	SEVERE WINTER STORMS, ICE AND FREEZING RAIN	DR-1265-MS	1999	Severe Ice Storm	
AR	AR SEVERE WEATHER 1-21-99	DR-1266-AR	1999	Severe Storm	
CA	CA-CITRUS CROP DAMAGE 2/2/99	DR-1267-CA	1999	Freezing	
WY	WY - WINTER STORM 10/5/98	DR-1268-WY	1999	Severe Ice Storm	
LA	SEVERE STORMS, TORNADOES AND FLOODING	DR-1269-LA	1999	Severe Storm	
MO	SEVERE STORMS AND FLOODING	DR-1270-MO	1999	Severe Storm	
GA	SEVERE STORMS AND TORNADOES	DR-1271-GA	1999	Severe Storm	
OK	OK, TORNADOES 5/3/99	DR-1272-OK	1999	Tornado	
KS	SEVERE STORMS AND TORNADOES	DR-1273-KS	1999	Tornado	
TX	TX, TORNADO 5/4/99	DR-1274-TX	1999	Tornado	
TN	SEVERE STORMS, TORNADOES AND FLOODING	DR-1275-TN	1999	Severe Storm	
CO	CO-FLOODING 4/30/99	DR-1276-CO	1999	Severe Storm	
IA	SEVERE STORMS, FLOODING, AND TORNADOES	DR-1277-IA	1999	Severe Storm	
IL	SEVERE STORMS AND FLASH FLOODING	DR-1278-IL	1999	Severe Storm	
ND	SEVERE STORMS, FLOODING, SNOW, ICE, GROUND SATURATION, LANSLIDES, MUDSLIDES, AND TOR	DR-1279-ND	1999	Flood	
SD	SEVERE STORMS, TORNADOES AND FLOODING	DR-1280-SD	1999	Tornado	
NV	NV - FLASH FLOODING 7/8/99	DR-1281-NV	1999	Severe Storm	
IA	SEVERE STORMS AND FLOODING	DR-1282-IA	1999	Severe Storm	
MN	SEVERE STORMS, WINDS, AND FLOODING	DR-1283-MN	1999	Severe Storm	
WI	WI-FLOOD-07/20/99	DR-1284-WI	1999	Flood	
UT	TORNADO, SEVERE THUNDERSTORMS, AND HAIL	DR-1285-UT	1999	Tornado	
NE	SEVERE STORMS AND FLOODING	DR-1286-NE	1999	Severe Storm	
TX	HURRICANE BRET	DR-1287-TX	1999	Hurricane	
MN	SEVERE ICE STORM AND FLOODING	DR-1288-MN	1999	Severe Ice Storm	
PA	PA - FLOODING 8/20/99	DR-1289-PA	1999	Severe Storm	
VA	VIRGINIA TROPICAL STORM DENNIS 08/27/99	DR-1290-VA	1999	Hurricane	
NC	HURRICANE DENNIS	DR-1291-NC	1999	Hurricane	
NC	HURRICANE FLOYD MAJOR DISASTER DECLARATIONS	DR-1292-NC	1999	Hurricane	
VA	HURRICANE FLOYD MAJOR DISASTER DECLARATIONS	DR-1293-VA	1999	Hurricane	
PA	HURRICANE FLOYD MAJOR DISASTER DECLARATIONS	DR-1294-PA	1999	Hurricane	
NJ	HURRICANE FLOYD MAJOR DISASTER DECLARATIONS	DR-1295-NJ	1999	Hurricane	
NY	HURRICANE FLOYD MAJOR DISASTER DECLARATIONS	DR-1296-NY	1999	Hurricane	
DE	HURRICANE FLOYD MAJOR DISASTER DECLARATIONS	DR-1297-DE	1999	Hurricane	
PA	TROPICAL DEPRESSION DENNIS PA	DR-1298-PA	1999	Flood	
SC	HURRICANE FLOYD MAJOR DISASTER DECLARATIONS	DR-1299-SC	1999	Hurricane	
FL	HURRICANE FLOYD MAJOR DISASTER DECLARATIONS	DR-1300-FL	1999	Hurricane	
NM	SEVERE ICE STORMS, FLOODING AND HEAVY RAINS	DR-1301-NM	1999	Severe Storm	
CT	HURRICANE FLOYD	DR-1302-CT	1999	Hurricane	
MD	HURRICANE FLOYD MAJOR DISASTER DECLARATIONS	DR-1303-MD	1999	Hurricane	
NE	SEVERE SNOW STORMS, RAIN, AND STRONG WINDS	DR-1190-NE	1998	Severe Storm	
IA	SEVERE SNOWSTORMS	DR-1191-IA	1998	Snowstorm	
MP	SUPER TYPHOON KEITH	DR-1192-MP	1998	Typhoon	
GU	TYPHOON PAKA, TORRENTIAL RAINS, HIGH WINDS, HIGH SURF	DR-1193-GU	1998	Typhoon	
MP	SUPER TYPHOON PAKA	DR-1194-MP	1998	Typhoon	
FL	SEVERE STORMS, HIGH WINDS, TORNADOES, AND FLOODING	DR-1195-FL	1998	Severe Storm	
NY	SEVERE STORMS AND FLOODING	DR-1196-NY	1998	Snowstorm	
TN	SEVERE STORMS AND FLOODING	DR-1197-TN	1998	Severe Storm	
ME	SEVERE ICE STORMS, RAINS AND HIGH WINDS	DR-1198-ME	1998	Severe Storm	
NH	SEVERE ICE STORM, RAINS AND HIGH WINDS	DR-1199-NH	1998	Severe Storm	
NC	SEVERE STORMS AND FLOODING	DR-1200-NC	1998	Severe Storm	
VT	SEVERE ICE STORMS, RAIN, HIGH WINDS AND FLOODING	DR-1201-VT	1998	Severe Storm	
NM	SEVERE WINTER STORM	DR-1202-NM	1998	Severe Storm	
CA	SEVERE WINTER STORMS AND FLOODING	DR-1203-CA	1998	Severe Storm	
FL	SEVERE STORMS, HIGH WINDS, TORNADOES, AND FLOODING	DR-1204-FL	1998	Severe Storm	
DE	SEVERE WINTER STORMS, HIGH WINDS, AND FLOODING	DR-1205-DE	1998	Severe Storm	
NJ	SEVERE WINTER COASTAL STORM, HIGH WINDS, FLOODING	DR-1206-NJ	1998	Coastal Storm	
KY	SEVERE WINTER STORM	DR-1207-KY	1998	Severe Storm	
AL	SEVERE STORMS AND FLOODING	DR-1208-AL	1998	Severe Storm	
GA	SEVERE STORMS AND FLOODING	DR-1209-GA	1998	Severe Storm	
MH	DROUGHT, CROP LOSSES	DR-1210-MH	1998	Drought	
NC	SEVERE STORMS TORNADOES, AND FLOODING	DR-1211-NC	1998	Severe Storm	
MN	TORNADOES AND SEVERE STORMS	DR-1212-MN	1998	Tornado	
FM	SEVERE DROUGHT	DR-1213-FM	1998	Drought	
AL	SEVERE STORMS AND TORNADOES	DR-1214-AL	1998	Severe Storm	
TN	SEVERE STORMS, TORNADOES AND FLOODING	DR-1215-TN	1998	Severe Storm	
KY	SEVERE STORMS, TORNADOES,AND FLOODING	DR-1216-KY	1998	Severe Storm	
IN	SEVERE WINTER STORM	DR-1217-IN	1998	Severe Storm	
SD	FLOODING, SEVERE STORMS, TORNADOES	DR-1218-SD	1998	Flood	
PA	SEVERE STORMS, TORNADOES,AND FLOODING	DR-1219-PA	1998	Severe Storm	
ND	FLOODING, GROUND SATURATION,SEVERE STORMS	DR-1220-ND	1998	Flood	
OR	FLOODING	DR-1221-OR	1998	Flood	
NY	SEVERE STORMS AND TORNADOES	DR-1222-NY	1998	Severe Storm	
FL	EXTREME FIRE HAZARD	DR-1223-FL	1998	Fire	
MA	HEAVY RAINS AND FLOODING	DR-1224-MA	1998	Flood	
MN	SEVERE STORMS, STRAIGHT LINE WINDS, AND TORNADOES	DR-1225-MN	1998	Tornado	
MI	SEVERE STORMS	DR-1226-MI	1998	Severe Storm	
OH	SEVERE STORMS, FLOODING, AND TORNADOES	DR-1227-OH	1998	Severe Storm	
VT	SEVERE STORMS AND FLOODING	DR-1228-VT	1998	Severe Storm	
WV	SEVERE STORMS AND FLOODING	DR-1229-WV	1998	Severe Storm	
IA	SEVERE STORMS, TORNADOES AND FLOODING	DR-1230-IA	1998	Flood	
NH	SEVERE STORMS AND FLOODING	DR-1231-NH	1998	Severe Storm	
ME	SEVERE STORMS AND FLOODING	DR-1232-ME	1998	Severe Storm	
NY	SEVERE STORMS AND FLOODING	DR-1233-NY	1998	Severe Storm	
IN	SEVERE STORMS AND TORNADOES, AND FLOODING	DR-1234-IN	1998	Severe Storm	
TN	SEVERE STORMS AND FLOODING	DR-1235-TN	1998	Severe Storm	
WI	SEVERE STORMS,STRAIGH LINE WINDS, TORNADOES,RAIN,AND FLOODI	DR-1236-WI	1998	Severe Storm	
MI	SEVERE STORMS AND HIGH WINDS	DR-1237-MI	1998	Severe Storm	
WI	SEVERE STORMS AND FLOODING	DR-1238-WI	1998	Severe Storm	
TX	TROPICAL STORM CHARLEY	DR-1239-TX	1998	Severe Storm	
NC	HURRICANE BONNIE	DR-1240-NC	1998	Hurricane	
FL	HURRICANE EARL	DR-1241-FL	1998	Hurricane	
VA	HURRICANE BONNIE	DR-1242-VA	1998	Hurricane	
SC	HURRICANE BONNIE	DR-1243-SC	1998	Hurricane	
NY	NY - SEVERE WX, SEPT 7, 1998	DR-1244-NY	1998	Severe Storm	
TX	HURRICANE GEORGES - TEXAS	DR-1245-TX	1998	Severe Storm	
LA	HURRICANE GEORGES/TS FRANCES	DR-1246-LA	1998	Hurricane	
PR	HURRICANE GEORGES - 18 SEP 98	DR-1247-PR	1998	Hurricane	
VI	HURRICANE GEORGES - 18 SEP 98	DR-1248-VI	1998	Hurricane	
FL	HURRICANE GEORGES	DR-1249-FL	1998	Hurricane	
AL	HURRICANE GEORGES - 18 SEP 98	DR-1250-AL	1998	Hurricane	
FL	TROPICAL STORM JOSEPHINE	DR-1141-FL	1997	Severe Storm	
MA	EXTREME WEATHER CONDITIONS AND FLOODING	DR-1142-MA	1997	Flood	
ME	SEVERE STORMS AND FLOODING	DR-1143-ME	1997	Flood	
NH	FALL NORTHEASTER RAINSTORM	DR-1144-NH	1997	Flood	
NJ	SEVERE STORMS AND FLOODING	DR-1145-NJ	1997	Severe Storm	
NY	SEVERE STORMS, FLOODING, HEAVY RAINS, HIGH WINDS	DR-1146-NY	1997	Severe Storm	
HI	PROLONGED AND HEAVY RAINS, HIGH SURF,FLOODING,LAND/MUD SLIDE	DR-1147-HI	1997	Flood	
NY	SEVERE STORMS HIGH WINDS, RAIN AND FLOODING	DR-1148-NY	1997	Severe Storm	
OR	FLOODING, LAND, MUD SLIDES, HIGH WINDS,SEVERE STORMS	DR-1149-OR	1997	Flood	
PA	SEVERE THUNDERSTORMS, HIGH WINDS,RAIN, FLOODING	DR-1150-PA	1997	Flood	
MN	SEVERE ICE STORM	DR-1151-MN	1997	Severe Storm	
WA	SEVERE ICE STORM	DR-1152-WA	1997	Severe Ice Storm	
NV	SEVERE STORMS, FLOODING, MUD AND LANDSLIDES	DR-1153-NV	1997	Severe Storm	
ID	SEVERE STORMS, FLOODING, MUD AND LANDSLIDES	DR-1154-ID	1997	Severe Storm	
CA	SEVERE STORMS, FLOODING, MUD AND LANDSLIDES	DR-1155-CA	1997	Severe Storm	
SD	SEVERE WINTER STORMS AND BLIZZARD CONDITIONS	DR-1156-SD	1997	Severe Storm	
ND	SEVERE WINTER STORMS AND BLIZZARD CONDITIONS	DR-1157-ND	1997	Severe Storm	
MN	SEVERE WINTER STORMS	DR-1158-MN	1997	Severe Storm	
WA	SEVERE WINTER STORMS, LAND & MUDS SLIDES,FLOODING	DR-1159-WA	1997	Severe Storm	
OR	SEVERE WINTER STORMS, LAND AND MUDSLIDES, FLOODING	DR-1160-OR	1997	Severe Storm	
SD	SEVERE WINTER STORM	DR-1161-SD	1997	Severe Storm	
AR	SEVERE STORMS AND TORNADOES	DR-1162-AR	1997	Severe Storm	
KY	SEVERE STORM, FLOODING, AND TORNADOES	DR-1163-KY	1997	Severe Storm	
OH	SEVERE STORMS AND FLOODING	DR-1164-OH	1997	Severe Storm	
IN	SEVERE STORMS AND FLOODING	DR-1165-IN	1997	Severe Storm	
FM	TYPHOON FERN	DR-1166-FM	1997	Typhoon	
TN	HEAVY RAINS, TORNADOES, FLOODING, HAIL, HIGH WINDS	DR-1167-TN	1997	Tornado	
WV	HEAVY & WIND DRIVEN RAIN, HIGH WINDS,FLOODING,SLIDES	DR-1168-WV	1997	Flood	
LA	SEVERE WINTER STORM	DR-1169-LA	1997	Severe Storm	
IL	SEVERE STORMS AND FLOODING	DR-1170-IL	1997	Severe Storm	
TN	SEVERE STORMS AND TORNADOES	DR-1171-TN	1997	Severe Storm	
WA	HEAVY RAINS, SNOW MELT, FLOODING, LAND & MUD SLIDES	DR-1172-WA	1997	Flood	
SD	SEVERE FLOODING, SEVER WINTER STORMS,HEAVY RAINS HIGH WINDS	DR-1173-SD	1997	Flood	
ND	SEVERE FLOODING,SEVERE WINTER STORMS, SNOWMELT, SPRING RAINS	DR-1174-ND	1997	Flood	
MN	SEVERE FLOODING, HIGH WINDS,SEVERE STORMS	DR-1175-MN	1997	Flood	
AR	FLOODING, SEVERE STORMS	DR-1176-AR	1997	Flood	
ID	SEVERE STORMS, SNOWMELT, LAND/MUD SLIDES, FLOODING	DR-1177-ID	1997	Severe Storm	
MS	FLOODING	DR-1178-MS	1997	Flood	
TX	SEVERE STORMS AND FLOODING	DR-1179-TX	1997	Flood	
WI	SEVERE STORMS AND FLOODING	DR-1180-WI	1997	Severe Storm	
MI	SEVERE STORMS, TORNADOES,AND FLOODING	DR-1181-MI	1997	Severe Storm	
WA	FL00DING, SNOW MELT	DR-1182-WA	1997	Flood	
MT	SEVERE STORMS,ICE JAMS, SNOW MELT, FLOODING	DR-1183-MT	1997	Severe Storm	
VT	EXCESSIVE RAINFALL, HIGH WINDS, AND FLOODING	DR-1184-VT	1997	Flood	
AL	SEVERE STORMS, FLOODING,HIGH WINDS, ASSOC WITH HURR DANNY	DR-1185-AL	1997	Severe Storm	
CO	SEVERE STORMS, HEAVY RAIN, FLASH FLOODS, FLOODING, MUDSLIDES	DR-1186-CO	1997	Flood	
MN	SEVERE STORMS, TORNADOES, HIGH WINDS, FLOODING	DR-1187-MN	1997	Severe Storm	
IL	SEVERE STORMS AND FLOODING	DR-1188-IL	1997	Severe Storm	
NJ	SEVERE STORMS AND FLOODING	DR-1189-NJ	1997	Severe Storm	
FL	HURRICANE OPAL	DR-1069-FL	1996	Hurricane	
AL	HURRICANE OPAL	DR-1070-AL	1996	Hurricane	
GA	HURRICANE OPAL	DR-1071-GA	1996	Hurricane	
AK	FLOODING	DR-1072-AK	1996	Flood	
NC	SEVERE STORMS, FLOODING, HIGH WINDS	DR-1073-NC	1996	Flood	
FL	SEVERE FLOODING	DR-1074-FL	1996	Flood	
SD	SEVERE WINTER STORM	DR-1075-SD	1996	Snowstorm	
GA	SEVERE STORMS AND TORNADOES	DR-1076-GA	1996	Severe Storm	
NH	EXCESSIVE RAINFALL, HIGH WINDS, AND FLOODING	DR-1077-NH	1996	Flood	
MN	HIGH WINDS, FREEZING RAIN, HEAVY SNOWFALL	DR-1078-MN	1996	Snowstorm	
WA	SEVERE STORMS, HIGH WIND, AND FLOODING	DR-1079-WA	1996	Severe Storm	
DC	BLIZZARD OF 96 (SEVERE SNOW STORM)	DR-1080-DC	1996	Severe Storm	
MD	BLIZZARD OF 96 (SEVERE SNOW STORM)	DR-1081-MD	1996	Snowstorm	
DE	BLIZZARD OF 96 (SEVERE SNOW STORM)	DR-1082-DE	1996	Snowstorm	
NY	BLIZZARD OF 96 (SEVERE SNOW STORM)	DR-1083-NY	1996	Snowstorm	
WV	BLIZZARD OF 96 (SEVERE SNOW STORM)	DR-1084-WV	1996	Snowstorm	
PA	BLIZZARD OF 96	DR-1085-PA	1996	Snowstorm	
VA	BLIZZARD OF 96 (SEVERE SNOW STORM)	DR-1086-VA	1996	Snowstorm	
NC	BLIZZARD OF 96	DR-1087-NC	1996	Snowstorm	
NJ	BLIZZARD OF 96 (SEVERE SNOW STORM)	DR-1088-NJ	1996	Snowstorm	
KY	BLIZZARD OF 96	DR-1089-KY	1996	Snowstorm	
MA	BLIZZARD OF 96	DR-1090-MA	1996	Snowstorm	
RI	BLIZZARD OF 96 (SEVERE SNOW STORM)	DR-1091-RI	1996	Snowstorm	
CT	BLIZZARD 0F 96	DR-1092-CT	1996	Snowstorm	
PA	SEVERE STORMS AND FLOODING	DR-1093-PA	1996	Flood	
MD	SEVERE STORMS AND FLOODING	DR-1094-MD	1996	Flood	
NY	SEVERE STORMS AND FLOODING	DR-1095-NY	1996	Flood	
WV	FLOODING	DR-1096-WV	1996	Flood	
OH	SEVERE STORMS AND FLOODING	DR-1097-OH	1996	Flood	
VA	FLOODING, HIGH WINDS, AND WIND DRIVEN RAIN	DR-1098-VA	1996	Flood	
OR	HIGH WINDS, SEVERE STORMS AND FLOODING	DR-1099-OR	1996	Flood	
WA	HIGH WINDS, SEVERE STORMS AND FLOODING	DR-1100-WA	1996	Flood	
VT	ICE JAMS AND FLOODING	DR-1101-VT	1996	Flood	
ID	SEVERE STORMS AND FLOODING	DR-1102-ID	1996	Severe Storm	
NC	WINTER STORM	DR-1103-NC	1996	Snowstorm	
AL	SEVERE WINTER STORMS, ICE AND FLOODING	DR-1104-AL	1996	Severe Storm	
MT	SEVERE STORMS, FLOODING, AND ICE JAMS	DR-1105-MT	1996	Severe Storm	
ME	SEVERE STORMS, ICE JAMS, FLOODING	DR-1106-ME	1996	Severe Storm	
OR	SEVERE STORMS AND HIGH WINDS	DR-1107-OR	1996	Severe Storm	
AL	SEVERE STORMS, FLOODING AND TORNADOES	DR-1108-AL	1996	Severe Storm	
IN	BLIZZARD OF 96	DR-1109-IN	1996	Flood	
IL	SEVERE STORMS AND TORNADOES	DR-1110-IL	1996	Severe Storm	
AR	SEVERE STORMS AND TORNADOES	DR-1111-AR	1996	Severe Storm	
IL	SEVERE STORMS AND FLOODING	DR-1112-IL	1996	Severe Storm	
MT	SEVERE STORMS, FLOODING, ICE JAMS, SOIL SATURATION	DR-1113-MT	1996	Severe Storm	
ME	SEVERE STORMS, MUDSLIDES, FLOODING	DR-1114-ME	1996	Severe Storm	
WV	FLOODING, HEAVY WINDS	DR-1115-WV	1996	Flood	
MN	FLOODING AND SEVERE STORMS	DR-1116-MN	1996	Flood	
KY	SEVERE STORMS, FLOODING AND TORNADOES	DR-1117-KY	1996	Severe Storm	
ND	SEVERE STORMS, FLOODING, & ICE JAMS	DR-1118-ND	1996	Severe Storm	
AK	WILDLAND FIRES	DR-1119-AK	1996	Fire	
PA	FLOODING, SEVERE STORMS	DR-1120-PA	1996	Flood	
IA	SEVERE STORMS AND FLOODING	DR-1121-IA	1996	Severe Storm	
OH	FLOODING	DR-1122-OH	1996	Flood	
NE	SEVERE STORMS AND TORNADOES	DR-1123-NE	1996	Severe Storm	
VT	EXTREME RAINFALL AND FLOODING	DR-1124-VT	1996	Flood	
IN	SEVERE STORMS AND FLOODING	DR-1125-IN	1996	Severe Storm	
VI	HURRICANE BERTHA	DR-1126-VI	1996	Hurricane	
NC	HURRICANE BERTHA	DR-1127-NC	1996	Hurricane	
MI	SEVERE STORMS AND FLOODING	DR-1128-MI	1996	Severe Storm	
IL	SEVERE STORMS AND FLOODING	DR-1129-IL	1996	Severe Storm	
PA	SEVERE STORMS, FLOODING, AND TORNADOES	DR-1130-PA	1996	Flood	
WI	SEVERE STORMS, FLOODING AND TORNADOES	DR-1131-WI	1996	Flood	
WV	HEAVY RAINS, HIGH WINDS, FLOODING, AND SLIDES	DR-1132-WV	1996	Fire	
IA	SEVERE STORMS, AND FLOODING	DR-1133-IA	1996	Severe Storm	
NC	HURRICANE FRAN	DR-1134-NC	1996	Hurricane	
VA	HURRICANE FRAN AND ASSOCIATED SEVERE STORM COND	DR-1135-VA	1996	Hurricane	
PR	HURRICANE HORTENSE	DR-1136-PR	1996	Hurricane	
WV	HURRICANE FRAN AND ASSOCIATED HEAVY RAINS,FLOODING HIGHWIND	DR-1137-WV	1996	Severe Storm	
PA	FLOODING ASSOCIATED WITH TROPICAL DEPRESSION FRAN	DR-1138-PA	1996	Flood	
MD	SEVERE STORMS AND FLOODING ASSOC WITH TROPICAL STORM FRAN	DR-1139-MD	1996	Hurricane	
SC	SEVERE WINDS AND FLOODING ASSOC WITH HURRICANE FRAN	DR-1140-SC	1996	Flood	
MH	HIGH SURF AND WAVE ACTION	DR-1040-MH	1995	Coastal Storm	
TX	SEVERE THUNDERSTORMS AND FLOODING	DR-1041-TX	1995	Flood	
GA	HEAVY RAINS, TORNADOS, FLOODING, HIGH WINDS	DR-1042-GA	1995	Severe Storm	
FL	TROPICAL STORM GORDON TORNADOES FLOODING RAINFALL	DR-1043-FL	1995	Severe Storm	
CA	SEVERE WINTER STORMS, FLOODING, LANDSLIDES, MUD FLOWS	DR-1044-CA	1995	Severe Storm	
SD	SEVERE WINTER STORMS	DR-1045-SD	1995	Snowstorm	
CA	SEVERE WINTER STORMS, FLOODING LANDSLIDES, MUD FLOW	DR-1046-CA	1995	Severe Storm	
AL	SEVERE STORMS, FLOODING AND TORNADOES	DR-1047-AL	1995	Severe Storm	
OK	EXPLOSION AT FEDERAL COURTHOUSE IN OKLAHOMA CITY	DR-1048-OK	1995	Human Cause	
LA	SEVERE STORMS AND FLOODING	DR-1049-LA	1995	Severe Storm	
ND	SEVERE STORMS, FLOODING, AND GROUND SATURATION	DR-1050-ND	1995	Severe Storm	
MS	SEVERE STORMS, TORNADOES, FLOODING	DR-1051-MS	1995	Severe Storm	
SD	FLOODING	DR-1052-SD	1995	Flood	
IL	SEVERE STORMS AND FLOODING	DR-1053-IL	1995	Severe Storm	
MO	SEVERE STORMS, TORNADOES, HAIL, FLOODING	DR-1054-MO	1995	Severe Storm	
KY	TORNADOES, SEVERE WINDS, HAIL	DR-1055-KY	1995	Tornado	
TX	SEVERE STORMS, HAIL, FLOODING, AND TORNADOES	DR-1056-TX	1995	Severe Storm	
TN	TORNADOES	DR-1057-TN	1995	Tornado	
OK	TORNADOES, SEVERE STORMS AND FLOODING	DR-1058-OK	1995	Tornado	
VA	SEVERE STORMS AND FLOODING	DR-1059-VA	1995	Severe Storm	
WV	SEVERE STORMS, HEAVY RAINS, FLOODING, MUDSLIDES	DR-1060-WV	1995	Severe Storm	
OR	FLOODING	DR-1061-OR	1995	Flood	
FL	HURRICANE ERIN	DR-1062-FL	1995	Hurricane	
VT	EXCESSIVE RAINFALL, FLOODING	DR-1063-VT	1995	Severe Storm	
MN	SEVERE THUNDERSTORMS, WINDS, FLOODING, TORNADOES, AND HEAT	DR-1064-MN	1995	Severe Storm	
OH	SEVERE STORMS AND FLOODING	DR-1065-OH	1995	Severe Storm	
OK	SEVERE STORMS AND FLOODING	DR-1066-OK	1995	Severe Storm	
VI	HURRICANE MARILYN	DR-1067-VI	1995	Hurricane	
PR	HURRICANE MARILYN	DR-1068-PR	1995	Hurricane	
OR	EARTHQUAKES	DR-1004-OR	1994	Earthquake	
CA	FIRES, MUD/LANDSLIDES, FLOODING, SOIL EROSION	DR-1005-CA	1994	Fire	
MO	SEVERE STORMS, TORNADOES, AND FLOODING	DR-1006-MO	1994	Severe Storm	
VA	SEVERE STORMS AND TORNADOES	DR-1007-VA	1994	Severe Storm	
CA	NORTHRIDGE EARTHQUAKE	DR-1008-CA	1994	Earthquake	
MS	SEVERE WINTER STORM, FREEEZING RAIN AND SLEET	DR-1009-MS	1994	Severe Storm	
TN	SEVERE WINTER ICE STORM,FLASH FLOODING	DR-1010-TN	1994	Severe Storm	
AR	SEVERE WINTER ICE STORM	DR-1011-AR	1994	Snowstorm	
LA	SEVERE WINTER ICE STORM	DR-1012-LA	1994	Severe Storm	
AL	SEVERE WINTER STORMS, FREEZING, FLOODING	DR-1013-AL	1994	Severe Storm	
VA	SEVERE ICE STORMS, FLOODING	DR-1014-VA	1994	Snowstorm	
PA	SEVERE WINTER STORMS	DR-1015-PA	1994	Severe Storm	
MD	SEVERE WINTER WEATHER AND ICE STORMS	DR-1016-MD	1994	Snowstorm	
DE	SEVERE ICE STORMS AND FLOODING	DR-1017-DE	1994	Severe Storm	
KY	SEVERE WEATHER, FREEZING RAIN, SLEET, SNW	DR-1018-KY	1994	Snowstorm	
AL	SEVERE STORMS, TORNADO, AND FLOODING	DR-1019-AL	1994	Severe Storm	
GA	TORNADOES, FLOODING, AND SEVERE STORMS	DR-1020-GA	1994	Tornado	
VA	SEVERE WINTER ICE STORM	DR-1021-VA	1994	Severe Storm	
TN	EXTENSIVE RAINFALL AND FLASH FLOODING	DR-1022-TN	1994	Flood	
MO	SEVERE STORMS, TORNADOES, FLOODING	DR-1023-MO	1994	Severe Storm	
OK	SEVERE STORMS AND FLOODING	DR-1024-OK	1994	Severe Storm	
IL	SEVERE STORMS AND FLOODING	DR-1025-IL	1994	Severe Storm	
TX	SEVERE STORMS AND TORNADOES	DR-1026-TX	1994	Severe Storm	
NE	SEVERE SNOW AND ICE STORM	DR-1027-NE	1994	Snowstorm	
MI	SEVERE DEEP FREEZE	DR-1028-MI	1994	Freezing	
ME	FLOODING AND ICE JAMS	DR-1029-ME	1994	Flood	
DC	SEVERE WINTER ICE STORM	DR-1030-DC	1994	Severe Storm	
SD	SEVERE STORMS AND FLOODING	DR-1031-SD	1994	Severe Storm	
ND	SEVERE STORMS, FLOODING	DR-1032-ND	1994	Severe Storm	
GA	TORNADOES, FLOODING TORRENTIAL RAIN(TROP STORM ALBERTO)	DR-1033-GA	1994	Tornado	
AL	SEVERE STORMS AND FLOODING (TROPICAL STORM ALBERTO)	DR-1034-AL	1994	Severe Storm	
FL	SEVERE STORMS AND FLOODING (TROPICAL STORM ALBERTO)	DR-1035-FL	1994	Severe Storm	
OR	THE EL NINO (THE SALMON INDUSTRY)	DR-1036-OR	1994	Fishing Losses	
WA	THE EL NINO (THE SALMON INDUSTRY)	DR-1037-WA	1994	Fishing Losses	
CA	THE EL NINO (THE SALMON INDUSTRY)	DR-1038-CA	1994	Fishing Losses	
AK	SEVERE STORMS AND FLOODING	DR-1039-AK	1994	Severe Storm	
KS	SEVERE STORMS & FLOODING	DR-1000-KS	1993	Flood	
ND	SEVERE STORMS & FLOODING	DR-1001-ND	1993	Flood	
IN	SEVERE STORMS AND FLOODING	DR-1002-IN	1993	Severe Storm	
NC	HURRICANE EMILY	DR-1003-NC	1993	Hurricane	
IA	SEVERE STORMS & FLOODING	DR-965-IA	1993	Flood	
FL	SEVERE STORMS, TORNADOES & FLOODING	DR-966-FL	1993	Severe Storm	
MS	WIND STORMS, TORNADOES & HAIL	DR-967-MS	1993	Tornado	
MS	SEVERE STORMS, HIGH WINDS & TORNADOES	DR-968-MS	1993	Tornado	
GA	HIGH WINDS, HEAVY RAINS & TORNADOES	DR-969-GA	1993	Tornado	
TX	SEVERE THUNDERSTORMS & TORNADOES	DR-970-TX	1993	Tornado	
MH	TYPHOON GAY	DR-971-MH	1993	Typhoon	
CT	WINTER STORM & COASTAL FLOODING	DR-972-CT	1993	Flood	
NJ	COASTAL STORM, HIGH TIDES, HEAVY RAIN, & FLOODING	DR-973-NJ	1993	Flood	
NY	COASTAL STORM, HIGH TIDES, HEAVY RAIN, & FLOODING	DR-974-NY	1993	Flood	
MA	WINTER COASTAL STORM	DR-975-MA	1993	Coastal Storm	
DE	SEVERE COASTAL STORM & FLOODING	DR-976-DE	1993	Coastal Storm	
AZ	SEVERE STORMS, TORNADOES & FLOODING	DR-977-AZ	1993	Flood	
LA	SEVERE STORMS & FLOODING	DR-978-LA	1993	Flood	
CA	SEVERE WINTER STORM, MUD & LAND SLIDES, & FLOODING	DR-979-CA	1993	Flood	
GA	TORNADOES, HIGH WINDS & HEAVY RAINS	DR-980-GA	1993	Tornado	
WA	SEVERE STORMS & HIGH WIND	DR-981-WA	1993	Severe Storm	
FL	TORNADOES, FLOODING, HIGH WINDS & TIDES, FREEZING	DR-982-FL	1993	Tornado	
NE	ICE JAMS & FLOODING	DR-983-NE	1993	Flood	
NY	EXPLOSION AT WORLD TRADE CENTER	DR-984-NY	1993	Human Cause	
OR	EARTHQUAKE	DR-985-OR	1993	Earthquake	
IA	SEVERE STORMS & FLOODING	DR-986-IA	1993	Flood	
OK	SEVERE STORMS & TORNADOES	DR-987-OK	1993	Tornado	
ME	HEAVY RAIN, SNOWMELT, ICE JAMS & FLOODING	DR-988-ME	1993	Flood	
MO	SEVERE STORMS & FLOODING	DR-989-MO	1993	Flood	
VT	HEAVY RAIN, SNOWMELT & FLOODING	DR-990-VT	1993	Flood	
OK	SEVERE STORMS, TORNADOES & FLOODING	DR-991-OK	1993	Severe Storm	
NM	SEVERE STORMS & FLOODING	DR-992-NM	1993	Flood	
MN	SEVERE STORMS, TORNADOES & FLOODING	DR-993-MN	1993	Severe Storm	
WI	SEVERE STORMS, TORNADOES & FLOODING	DR-994-WI	1993	Severe Storm	
MO	SEVERE STORMS & FLOODING	DR-995-MO	1993	Flood	
IA	SEVERE STORMS & FLOODING	DR-996-IA	1993	Flood	
IL	SEVERE STORMS & FLOODING	DR-997-IL	1993	Flood	
NE	SEVERE STORMS AND FLOODING	DR-998-NE	1993	Flood	
SD	SEVERE STORMS, TORNADOES & FLOODING	DR-999-SD	1993	Severe Storm	
CA	OAKLAND HILLS FIRE	DR-919-CA	1992	Fire	
MA	COASTAL STORM	DR-920-MA	1992	Coastal Storm	
ME	COASTAL STORM	DR-921-ME	1992	Coastal Storm	
WA	FIRES	DR-922-WA	1992	Fire	
NH	COASTAL STORM	DR-923-NH	1992	Coastal Storm	
GU	TYPHOON YURI	DR-924-GU	1992	Typhoon	
MH	TYPHOON ZELDA	DR-925-MH	1992	Typhoon	
FM	TYPHOON YURI	DR-926-FM	1992	Typhoon	
AS	HURRICANE VAL	DR-927-AS	1992	Hurricane	
IA	ICE STORM	DR-928-IA	1992	Severe Ice Storm	
MN	ICE STORM	DR-929-MN	1992	Severe Ice Storm	
TX	SEVERE THUNDERSTORMS	DR-930-TX	1992	Flood	
PR	SEVERE STORMS & FLOODING	DR-931-PR	1992	Flood	
MH	TROPICAL STORM AXEL	DR-932-MH	1992	Flood	
DE	SEVERE COASTAL STORM	DR-933-DE	1992	Flood	
FM	TYPHOON AXEL	DR-934-FM	1992	Typhoon	
CA	RAIN/SNOW/WIND STORMS, FLOODING, MUDSLIDES	DR-935-CA	1992	Flood	
NJ	SEVERE COASTAL STORM	DR-936-NJ	1992	Severe Storm	
TX	SEVERE STORMS & FLOODING	DR-937-TX	1992	Flood	
VT	HEAVY RAINS, ICE JAMS & FLOODING	DR-938-VT	1992	Flood	
MS	SEVERE STORMS & TORNADOES	DR-939-MS	1992	Tornado	
ME	HEAVY RAINS, ICE JAMS & FLOODING	DR-940-ME	1992	Flood	
IL	FLOODING	DR-941-IL	1992	Flood	
CA	FIRE DURING A PERIOD OF CIVIL UNREST	DR-942-CA	1992	Fire	
CA	EARTHQUAKE & AFTERSHOCKS	DR-943-CA	1992	Earthquake	
VA	SEVERE STORMS & FLOODING	DR-944-VA	1992	Flood	
NM	THUNDERSTORMS, HAIL & FLOODING	DR-945-NM	1992	Flood	
MN	SEVERE STORMS, TORNADOES & FLOODING	DR-946-MN	1992	Severe Storm	
CA	EARTHQUAKE & AFTERSHOCKS	DR-947-CA	1992	Earthquake	
SD	SEVERE STORMS, TORNADOES & FLOODING	DR-948-SD	1992	Severe Storm	
TX	SEVERE STORMS & TORNADOES	DR-949-TX	1992	Tornado	
AR	SEVERE THUNDERSTORMS	DR-950-AR	1992	Severe Storm	
OH	SEVERE STORMS, TORNADOES & FLOODING	DR-951-OH	1992	Severe Storm	
FL	SEVERE STORMS & FLOODING	DR-952-FL	1992	Flood	
IN	SEVERE STORMS & FLASH FLOODING	DR-953-IN	1992	Flood	
NE	SEVERE STORMS & FLOODING	DR-954-NE	1992	Flood	
FL	HURRICANE ANDREW	DR-955-FL	1992	Hurricane	
LA	HURRICANE ANDREW	DR-956-LA	1992	Hurricane	
GU	TYPHOON OMAR	DR-957-GU	1992	Typhoon	
CA	OLD GULCH & FOUNTAIN FIRES	DR-958-CA	1992	Fire	
WI	SEVERE STORMS & TORNADOES	DR-959-WI	1992	Tornado	
TX	EXCESSIVE RAIN & HAIL	DR-960-TX	1992	Severe Storm	
HI	HURRICANE INIKI	DR-961-HI	1992	Hurricane	
IN	SEVERE STORMS, TORNADOES & FLOODING	DR-962-IN	1992	Severe Storm	
WI	SEVERE STORMS & TORNADOES	DR-963-WI	1992	Tornado	
WI	SEVERE STORMS & FLOODING	DR-964-WI	1992	Flood	
GA	SEVERE STORMS & FLOODING	DR-880-GA	1991	Flood	
SC	SEVERE STORMS & FLOODING	DR-881-SC	1991	Flood	
PW	TYPHOON MIKE	DR-882-PW	1991	Typhoon	
WA	SEVERE STORMS & FLOODING	DR-883-WA	1991	Flood	
AZ	SEVERE STORMS & FLOODING	DR-884-AZ	1991	Flood	
IN	SEVERE STORMS & FLOODING	DR-885-IN	1991	Flood	
FM	TYPHOON OWEN	DR-886-FM	1991	Typhoon	
GU	TYPHOON RUSS	DR-887-GU	1991	Typhoon	
MS	SEVERE STORMS, TORNADOES & FLOODING	DR-888-MS	1991	Severe Storm	
TN	SEVERE STORMS & FLOODING	DR-889-TN	1991	Flood	
AL	SEVERE STORMS & FLOODING	DR-890-AL	1991	Flood	
IN	SEVERE STORMS & FLOODING	DR-891-IN	1991	Flood	
FM	TYPHOON RUSS	DR-892-FM	1991	Typhoon	
KY	SEVERE STORMS & FLOODING	DR-893-KY	1991	Flood	
CA	SEVERE FREEZE	DR-894-CA	1991	Freezing	
MS	SEVERE STORMS & FLOODING	DR-895-MS	1991	Flood	
WA	SEVERE STORMS & HIGH TIDES	DR-896-WA	1991	Flood	
GA	SEVERE STORMS & FLOODING	DR-897-GA	1991	Flood	
NY	SEVERE WINTER STORM	DR-898-NY	1991	Snowstorm	
IN	SEVERE ICE STORM	DR-899-IN	1991	Severe Ice Storm	
TX	SEVERE STORMS, TORNADOES & FLOODING	DR-900-TX	1991	Severe Storm	
ME	SEVERE STORMS, ICE JAMS & FLOODING	DR-901-ME	1991	Snowstorm	
LA	SEVERE STORMS & FLOODING	DR-902-LA	1991	Flood	
KS	SEVERE STORMS & TORNADOES	DR-903-KS	1991	Tornado	
LA	SEVERE STORMS, TORNADOES & FLOODING	DR-904-LA	1991	Severe Storm	
OK	SEVERE STORMS & TORNADOES	DR-905-OK	1991	Tornado	
MS	SEVERE STORMS, TORNADOES & FLOODING	DR-906-MS	1991	Severe Storm	
AR	SEVERE STORMS & FLOODING	DR-907-AR	1991	Flood	
NE	SEVERE STORMS & FLOODING	DR-908-NE	1991	Flood	
AK	HEAVY SNOW, ICE JAMS & FLOODING	DR-909-AK	1991	Snowstorm	
TN	SEVERE STORMS & FLOODING	DR-910-TN	1991	Flood	
IA	SEVERE STORMS & FLOODING	DR-911-IA	1991	Flood	
WI	SEVERE STORMS & HAIL	DR-912-WI	1991	Severe Storm	
RI	HURRICANE BOB	DR-913-RI	1991	Hurricane	
MA	HURRICANE BOB	DR-914-MA	1991	Hurricane	
ME	HURRICANE BOB & FLOODING	DR-915-ME	1991	Hurricane	
CT	HURRICANE BOB	DR-916-CT	1991	Hurricane	
NH	HURRICANE BOB & SEVERE STORMS	DR-917-NH	1991	Hurricane	
NY	HURRICANE BOB	DR-918-NY	1991	Hurricane	
CA	LOMA PRIETA EARTHQUAKE	DR-845-CA	1990	Earthquake	
KY	SEVERE STORMS, MUDSLIDES & FLOODING	DR-846-KY	1990	Flood	
VA	SEVERE STORMS, MUDSLIDES & FLOODING	DR-847-VA	1990	Flood	
AL	SEVERE STORMS & TORNADOES	DR-848-AL	1990	Tornado	
LA	HEAVY RAINS & FLOODING	DR-849-LA	1990	Flood	
TX	SEVERE FREEZE	DR-850-TX	1990	Freezing	
FL	SEVERE FREEZE	DR-851-FL	1990	Freezing	
WA	SEVERE STORMS & FLOODING	DR-852-WA	1990	Flood	
OR	SEVERE STORMS & FLOODING	DR-853-OR	1990	Flood	
MP	TYPHOON KORYN	DR-854-MP	1990	Typhoon	
AS	HURRICANE OFA	DR-855-AS	1990	Hurricane	
AL	SEVERE STORMS, TORNADOES & FLOODING	DR-856-AL	1990	Severe Storm	
GA	SEVERE STORMS, TORNAODES & FLOODING	DR-857-GA	1990	Severe Storm	
TN	SEVERE STORMS & FLOODING	DR-858-TN	1990	Flood	
MS	SEVERE STORMS, TORNADOES & FLOODING	DR-859-MS	1990	Severe Storm	
IL	SEVERE ICE STORM	DR-860-IL	1990	Severe Ice Storm	
AL	SEVERE STORMS, TORNADOES & FLOODING	DR-861-AL	1990	Severe Storm	
FL	SEVERE STORMS & FLOODING	DR-862-FL	1990	Flood	
TX	SEVERE STORMS, TORNADOES & FLOODING	DR-863-TX	1990	Severe Storm	
HI	LAVA FLOW, KILAUEA VOLCANO	DR-864-HI	1990	Volcanic Eruption	
AR	SEVERE STORMS & FLOODING	DR-865-AR	1990	Flood	
OK	SEVERE STORMS, TORNADOES & FLOODING	DR-866-OK	1990	Severe Storm	
MO	SEVERE STORMS & FLOODING	DR-867-MO	1990	Flood	
IA	SEVERE STORMS & FLOODING	DR-868-IA	1990	Flood	
IN	SEVERE STORMS, TORNADOES & FLOODING	DR-869-IN	1990	Severe Storm	
OH	SEVERE STORMS, TORNADOES & FLOODING	DR-870-OH	1990	Severe Storm	
IL	SEVERE STORMS, TORNADOES & FLOODING	DR-871-IL	1990	Severe Storm	
CA	FIRES	DR-872-CA	1990	Fire	
NE	SEVERE STORMS, TORNADOES & FLOODING	DR-873-NE	1990	Severe Storm	
WI	SEVERE STORMS, TORNADOES & FLOODING	DR-874-WI	1990	Severe Storm	
VT	SEVERE STORMS & FLOODING	DR-875-VT	1990	Flood	
NH	SEVERE STORMS & FLOODING	DR-876-NH	1990	Flood	
WI	SEVERE STORMS & FLOODING	DR-877-WI	1990	Flood	
IL	TORNADOES	DR-878-IL	1990	Tornado	
IA	SEVERE STORMS & FLOODING	DR-879-IA	1990	Flood	

=== 1975 - 1990 ===
State	Name	FEMA disaster code	Year declared	Disaster type	Notes
TX	HURRICANE GILBERT	DR-816-TX	1989	Hurricane	
AR	SEVERE STORMS & TORNADOES	DR-817-AR	1989	Tornado	
NC	SEVERE STORMS & TORNADOES	DR-818-NC	1989	Tornado	
IL	SEVERE STORMS & TORNADOES	DR-819-IL	1989	Tornado	
UT	DIKE FAILURE & FLASH FLOODING	DR-820-UT	1989	Flood	
KY	SEVERE STORMS & FLOODING	DR-821-KY	1989	Flood	
WA	HEAVY RAINS, FLOODING & MUDSLIDES	DR-822-WA	1989	Flood	
TX	SEVERE STORMS & FLOODING	DR-823-TX	1989	Flood	
MN	FLOODING	DR-824-MN	1989	Flood	
ND	FLOODING	DR-825-ND	1989	Flood	
AK	SEVERE FREEZING	DR-826-AK	1989	Freezing	
NC	TORNADOES	DR-827-NC	1989	Tornado	
TX	SEVERE STORMS, TORNADOES & FLOODING	DR-828-TX	1989	Severe Storm	
LA	SEVERE STORMS & FLOODING	DR-829-LA	1989	Flood	
ME	SEVERE STORMS & FLOODING	DR-830-ME	1989	Flood	
OH	SEVERE STORMS & FLOODING	DR-831-OH	1989	Flood	
AK	FLOODING	DR-832-AK	1989	Flood	
LA	SEVERE STORMS & TORNADOES	DR-833-LA	1989	Tornado	
KY	SEVERE STORMS & FLOODING	DR-834-KY	1989	Flood	
LA	TROPICAL STORM ALLISON	DR-835-LA	1989	Flood	
TX	TROPICAL STORM ALLISON	DR-836-TX	1989	Flood	
CT	SEVERE STORMS & TORNADOES	DR-837-CT	1989	Tornado	
DC	SEVERE STORMS & HIGH WINDS	DR-838-DC	1989	Severe Storm	
MD	SEVERE STORMS & HIGH WINDS	DR-839-MD	1989	Severe Storm	
VT	SEVERE STORMS & FLOODING	DR-840-VT	1989	Flood	
VI	HURRICANE HUGO	DR-841-VI	1989	Hurricane	
PR	HURRICANE HUGO	DR-842-PR	1989	Hurricane	
SC	HURRICANE HUGO	DR-843-SC	1989	Hurricane	
NC	HURRICANE HUGO	DR-844-NC	1989	Hurricane	
CA	EARTHQUAKE & AFTERSHOCKS	DR-799-CA	1988	Earthquake	
MP	TYPHOON LYNN	DR-800-MP	1988	Typhoon	
NY	SEVERE WINTER STORM	DR-801-NY	1988	Snowstorm	
TX	SEVERE STORMS & TORNADOES	DR-802-TX	1988	Tornado	
FM	TYPHOON NINA	DR-803-FM	1988	Typhoon	
LA	TORNADOES & FLOODING	DR-804-LA	1988	Tornado	
PR	SEVERE STORMS & FLOODING	DR-805-PR	1988	Flood	
AR	TORNADOES	DR-806-AR	1988	Tornado	
AR	SEVERE STORMS & FLOODING	DR-807-AR	1988	Flood	
HI	SEVERE STORMS, MUDSLIDES & FLOODING	DR-808-HI	1988	Flood	
MH	TROPICAL STORM ROY	DR-809-MH	1988	Typhoon	
GU	TYPHOON ROY	DR-810-GU	1988	Typhoon	
MP	TYPHOON ROY	DR-811-MP	1988	Typhoon	
CA	SEVERE STORMS, HIGH TIDES & FLOODING	DR-812-CA	1988	Flood	
AK	FIRE	DR-813-AK	1988	Fire	
IA	RAIN, WINDS, & TORNADOES	DR-814-IA	1988	Tornado	
CA	WILDFIRES	DR-815-CA	1988	Fire	
WI	SEVERE STORMS & FLOODING	DR-775-WI	1987	Flood	
IL	SEVERE STORMS & FLOODING	DR-776-IL	1987	Flood	
MT	SEVERE STORMS & FLOODING	DR-777-MT	1987	Flood	
OK	SEVERE STORMS & FLOODING	DR-778-OK	1987	Flood	
MO	SEVERE STORMS & FLOODING	DR-779-MO	1987	Flood	
KS	SEVERE STORMS & FLOODING	DR-780-KS	1987	Flood	
AK	COASTAL STORM, HIGH WINDS & WAVES	DR-781-AK	1987	Flood	
AK	SEVERE STORMS & FLOODING	DR-782-AK	1987	Flood	
MP	TYPHOON KIM	DR-783-MP	1987	Typhoon	
WA	SEVERE STORMS & FLOODING	DR-784-WA	1987	Flood	
AS	HURRICANE TUSI	DR-785-AS	1987	Hurricane	
FM	TYPHOON ORCHID	DR-786-FM	1987	Typhoon	
MS	SEVERE STORMS, TORNADOES & FLOODING	DR-787-MS	1987	Severe Storm	
ME	SEVERE STORMS & FLOODING	DR-788-ME	1987	Flood	
NH	SEVERE STORMS & FLOODING	DR-789-NH	1987	Flood	
MA	SEVERE STORMS & FLOODING	DR-790-MA	1987	Flood	
MH	FIRE	DR-791-MH	1987	Fire	
NY	FLOODING	DR-792-NY	1987	Flood	
TX	SEVERE STORMS & TORNADOES	DR-793-TX	1987	Tornado	
OK	SEVERE STORMS & FLOODING	DR-794-OK	1987	Flood	
IA	STORMS & FLASH FLOODING	DR-795-IA	1987	Flood	
OH	SEVERE STORMS & FLOODING	DR-796-OH	1987	Flood	
MN	SEVERE STORMS, TORNADOES & FLOODING	DR-797-MN	1987	Severe Storm	
IL	SEVERE STORMS & FLOODING	DR-798-IL	1987	Flood	
PA	HURRICANE GLORIA	DR-745-PA	1986	Hurricane	
PR	SEVERE STORMS, FLOODING & MUDSLIDES	DR-746-PR	1986	Flood	
CT	HURRICANE GLORIA	DR-747-CT	1986	Hurricane	
RI	HURRICANE GLORIA	DR-748-RI	1986	Hurricane	
NJ	HURRICANE GLORIA	DR-749-NJ	1986	Hurricane	
NY	HURRICANE GLORIA	DR-750-NY	1986	Hurricane	
MA	HURRICANE GLORIA	DR-751-MA	1986	Hurricane	
LA	HURRICANE JUAN	DR-752-LA	1986	Hurricane	
WV	SEVERE STORMS & FLOODING	DR-753-WV	1986	Flood	
PA	SEVERE STORMS & FLOODING	DR-754-PA	1986	Flood	
VA	SEVERE STORMS & FLOODING	DR-755-VA	1986	Flood	
FL	HURRICANE KATE	DR-756-FL	1986	Hurricane	
WA	SEVERE STORMS & FLOODING	DR-757-WA	1986	Flood	
CA	SEVERE STORMS & FLOODING	DR-758-CA	1986	Flood	
NV	SEVERE STORMS & FLOODING	DR-759-NV	1986	Flood	
UT	HEAVY RAINS, SNOWMELT & FLOODING	DR-760-UT	1986	Flood	
MT	HEAVY RAINS, LANDSLIDES & FLOODING	DR-761-MT	1986	Flood	
WA	HEAVY RAINS, LANDSLIDES & FLOODING	DR-762-WA	1986	Flood	
TX	SEVERE STORMS, RAINS & TORNADOES	DR-763-TX	1986	Tornado	
SD	SEVERE STORMS & FLOODING	DR-764-SD	1986	Flood	
FM	TYPHOON LOLA	DR-765-FM	1986	Typhoon	
PA	SEVERE STORMS & FLOODING	DR-766-PA	1986	Flood	
IN	TORNADOES	DR-767-IN	1986	Tornado	
PR	HEAVY RAINS, FLOODING & MUDSLIDES	DR-768-PR	1986	Flood	
WA	SEVERE STORMS & FLOODING	DR-769-WA	1986	Flood	
WI	SEVERE STORMS	DR-770-WI	1986	Flood	
NH	SEVERE STORMS, FLOODING	DR-771-NH	1986	Flood	
TX	TORNADOES	DR-772-TX	1986	Tornado	
MD	SEVERE STORM & FLOODING	DR-773-MD	1986	Flood	
MI	SEVERE STORMS & FLOODING	DR-774-MI	1986	Flood	
TX	SEVERE STORMS & FLOODING	DR-726-TX	1985	Flood	
TX	SEVERE STORMS & FLOODING	DR-727-TX	1985	Flood	
LA	SEVERE STORMS & FLOODING	DR-728-LA	1985	Flood	
VI	TROPICAL STORM KLAUS	DR-729-VI	1985	Hurricane	
AZ	HEAVY RAIN & HIGH WINDS	DR-730-AZ	1985	Severe Storm	
NM	SEVERE STORMS & FLOODING	DR-731-NM	1985	Flood	
FL	SEVERE FREEZE	DR-732-FL	1985	Freezing	
NY	FLOODING	DR-733-NY	1985	Flood	
NY	SNOW MELT & ICE JAMS	DR-734-NY	1985	Snowstorm	
IL	SEVERE STORMS & FLOODING	DR-735-IL	1985	Flood	
PR	STORMS, MUD/LAND SLIDES, FLOODING	DR-736-PR	1985	Flood	
PA	SEVERE STORMS, HIGH WINDS & TORNADOES	DR-737-PA	1985	Tornado	
OH	SEVERE STORMS & TORNADOES	DR-738-OH	1985	Tornado	
CA	GRASS, WILDLANDS, & FOREST FIRES	DR-739-CA	1985	Fire	
WY	SEVERE STORMS, HAIL & FLOODING	DR-740-WY	1985	Flood	
MS	HURRICANE ELENA	DR-741-MS	1985	Hurricane	
AL	HURRICANE ELENA	DR-742-AL	1985	Hurricane	
FL	HURRICANE ELENA	DR-743-FL	1985	Hurricane	
MI	SEVERE STORMS AND FLOODING	DR-744-MI	1985	Flood	
AZ	SEVERE STORMS & FLOODING	DR-691-AZ	1984	Flood	
NM	SEVERE STORMS AND FLOODING	DR-692-NM	1984	Flood	
OK	SEVERE STORMS & FLOODING	DR-693-OK	1984	Flood	
ID	EARTHQUAKE	DR-694-ID	1984	Earthquake	
AL	SEVERE STORMS,FLOODING AND TORNADOES	DR-695-AL	1984	Severe Storm	
TX	SEVERE FREEZING WEATHER	DR-696-TX	1984	Freezing	
ID	ICE JAMS AND FLOODING	DR-697-ID	1984	Snowstorm	
FL	FREEZING TEMPERATURES	DR-698-FL	1984	Freezing	
NC	SEVERE STORMS & TORNADOES	DR-699-NC	1984	Tornado	
SC	SEVERE STORMS & TORNADOES	DR-700-SC	1984	Tornado	
NJ	COASTAL STORMS & FLOODING	DR-701-NJ	1984	Flood	
NY	COASTAL STORMS & FLOODING	DR-702-NY	1984	Flood	
MS	TORNADOES	DR-703-MS	1984	Tornado	
OK	SEVERE STORMS & TORNADOES	DR-704-OK	1984	Tornado	
KY	HIGH WINDS, TORNADOES & FLOODING	DR-705-KY	1984	Severe Storm	
WV	SEVERE STORMS & FLOODING	DR-706-WV	1984	Flood	
VA	SEVERE STORMS & FLOODING	DR-707-VA	1984	Flood	
TN	SEVERE STORMS & FLOODING	DR-708-TN	1984	Flood	
OK	SEVERE STORMS & FLOODING	DR-709-OK	1984	Flood	
WI	SEVERE STORMS & TORNADOES	DR-710-WI	1984	Tornado	
CT	SEVERE STORMS & FLOODING	DR-711-CT	1984	Flood	
VT	SEVERE STORMS & FLOODING	DR-712-VT	1984	Flood	
MO	SEVERE STORMS & FLOODING	DR-713-MO	1984	Flood	
KS	SEVERE STORMS, TORNADOES & FLOODING	DR-714-KS	1984	Severe Storm	
IA	SEVERE STORMS, TORNADOES, HAIL & FLOODS	DR-715-IA	1984	Severe Storm	
NE	TORNADOES & FLOODING	DR-716-NE	1984	Tornado	
SD	SEVERE STORMS & FLOODING	DR-717-SD	1984	Flood	
NE	SEVERE STORMS & TORNADOES	DR-718-NE	1984	Tornado	
CO	SEVERE STORMS, MUDSLIDES, LANDSLIDES & FLOODING	DR-719-CO	1984	Flood	
UT	SEVERE STORMS, MUDSLIDES, LANDSLIDES & FLOODING	DR-720-UT	1984	Flood	
PA	SEVERE STORMS & FLOODING	DR-721-PA	1984	Flood	
NM	SEVERE STORMS & FLOODING	DR-722-NM	1984	Flood	
NV	HEAVY RAINS & FLOODING	DR-723-NV	1984	Flood	
NC	HURRICANE DIANA	DR-724-NC	1984	Hurricane	
NY	SEVERE STORMS & FLOODING	DR-725-NY	1984	Flood	
HI	TYPHOON IWA	DR-671-HI	1983	Typhoon	
MO	SEVERE STORMS AND FLOODING	DR-672-MO	1983	Flood	
AR	SEVERE STORMS, TORNADOES & FLOODING	DR-673-AR	1983	Severe Storm	
IL	SEVERE STORMS, TORNADOES & FLOODING	DR-674-IL	1983	Severe Storm	
LA	SEVERE STORMS AND FLOODING	DR-675-LA	1983	Flood	
WA	SEVERE STORMS, HIGH TIDES & FLOODING	DR-676-WA	1983	Flood	
CA	COASTAL STORMS, FLOODS, SLIDES & TORNADOES	DR-677-CA	1983	Coastal Storm	
MS	SEVERE STORMS, FLOODING & TORNADOES	DR-678-MS	1983	Severe Storm	
LA	SEVERE STORMS AND FLOODING	DR-679-LA	1983	Flood	
UT	SEVERE STORMS, LANDSLIDES & FLOODING	DR-680-UT	1983	Flood	
VI	SEVERE STORMS, FLOODING & MUDSLIDES	DR-681-VI	1983	Flood	
CA	COALINGA EARTHQUAKE	DR-682-CA	1983	Earthquake	
MS	SEVERE STORMS, TORNADOES, AND FLOODING	DR-683-MS	1983	Severe Storm	
IL	SEVERE STORMS, TORNADOES & FLOODING	DR-684-IL	1983	Severe Storm	
OK	SEVERE STORMS AND FLOODING	DR-685-OK	1983	Flood	
AZ	FLOODING	DR-686-AZ	1983	Flood	
CA	FLOODING	DR-687-CA	1983	Flood	
AR	SEVERE STORMS & FLOODING	DR-688-AR	1983	Flood	
TX	HURRICANE ALICIA	DR-689-TX	1983	Hurricane	
CA	FLASH FLOODING	DR-690-CA	1983	Flood	
TX	SEVERE STORMS & FLOODING	DR-648-TX	1982	Flood	
OK	SEVERE STORMS & FLOODING	DR-649-OK	1982	Flood	
MA	URBAN FIRE	DR-650-MA	1982	Fire	
CA	SEVERE STORMS, FLOOD, MUDSLIDES & HIGH TIDE	DR-651-CA	1982	Flood	
IN	SEVERE STORMS & FLOODING	DR-652-IN	1982	Flood	
OH	SEVERE STORMS & FLOODING	DR-653-OH	1982	Flood	
MI	FLOODING	DR-654-MI	1982	Flood	
TX	SEVERE STORMS & TORNADOES	DR-655-TX	1982	Tornado	
HI	HEAVY RAINS & FLOODING	DR-656-HI	1982	Flood	
CA	URBAN FIRE	DR-657-CA	1982	Fire	
ND	FLOODING	DR-658-ND	1982	Flood	
TX	SEVERE STORMS & FLOODING	DR-659-TX	1982	Flood	
IL	SEVERE STORMS & TORNADOES	DR-660-IL	1982	Tornado	
CT	SEVERE STORMS & FLOODING	DR-661-CT	1982	Flood	
OK	SEVERE STORMS & FLOODING	DR-662-OK	1982	Flood	
KS	SEVERE STORMS AND FLOODING	DR-663-KS	1982	Flood	
FL	SEVERE STORMS AND FLOODING	DR-664-FL	1982	Flood	
CO	FLASH FLOOD DUE TO DAM FAILURE	DR-665-CO	1982	Flood	
TN	SEVERE STORMS AND FLOODING	DR-666-TN	1982	Flood	
MO	SEVERE STORMS & FLOODING	DR-667-MO	1982	Flood	
TN	SEVERE STORMS & FLOODING	DR-668-TN	1982	Flood	
CA	LEVEE BREAK	DR-669-CA	1982	Flood	
KY	FLASH FLOODING	DR-670-KY	1982	Flood	
CA	LEVEE BREAK & FLOODING	DR-633-CA	1981	Flood	
MP	TYPHOON DINAH	DR-634-MP	1981	Typhoon	
CA	BRUSH & TIMBER FIRES	DR-635-CA	1981	Fire	
KY	SEWER EXPLOSION, TOXIC WASTE	DR-636-KY	1981	Toxic Substances	
AS	TYPHOON ESAU	DR-637-AS	1981	Typhoon	
AL	SEVERE STORMS, TORNADOES & FLOODING	DR-638-AL	1981	Severe Storm	
AL	SEVERE STORMS & FLOODING	DR-639-AL	1981	Flood	
MT	SEVERE STORMS & FLOODING	DR-640-MT	1981	Flood	
PA	SEVERE STORMS & FLOODING	DR-641-PA	1981	Flood	
OH	SEVERE STORMS, FLOODING & TORNADOES	DR-642-OH	1981	Severe Storm	
IL	SEVERE STORMS, FLOODING & TORNADOES	DR-643-IL	1981	Severe Storm	
KS	SEVERE STORMS, FLOODING & TORNADOES	DR-644-KS	1981	Severe Storm	
NV	SEVERE STORMS & FLOODING	DR-645-NV	1981	Flood	
TX	SEVERE STORMS & FLOODING	DR-646-TX	1981	Flood	
FM	FIRE	DR-647-FM	1981	Fire	
CT	TORNADO & SEVERE STORMS	DR-608-CT	1980	Tornado	
CA	EARTHQUAKE	DR-609-CA	1980	Earthquake	
AS	FLOODING, MUDSLIDES & LANDSLIDES	DR-610-AS	1980	Flood	
FM	SEAWAVE ACTION & FLOODING	DR-611-FM	1980	Flood	
WA	STORMS, HIGH TIDES, MUDSLIDES & FLOODING	DR-612-WA	1980	Flood	
HI	SEVERE STORMS, HIGH SURF & FLOODING	DR-613-HI	1980	Flood	
AZ	SEVERE STORMS & FLOODING	DR-614-AZ	1980	Flood	
CA	SEVERE STORMS, MUDSLIDES & FLOODING	DR-615-CA	1980	Flood	
LA	SEVERE STORMS & FLOODING	DR-616-LA	1980	Flood	
AR	SEVERE STORMS & TORNADOES	DR-617-AR	1980	Tornado	
MS	STORMS, FLOOD, MUDSLIDES & TORNADOES	DR-618-MS	1980	Severe Storm	
AL	SEVERE STORMS, TORNADOES & FLOODING	DR-619-AL	1980	Severe Storm	
MO	SEVERE STORMS & TORNADOES	DR-620-MO	1980	Tornado	
MI	SEVERE STORMS & TORNADOES	DR-621-MI	1980	Tornado	
LA	SEVERE STORMS & FLOODING	DR-622-LA	1980	Flood	
WA	VOLCANIC ERUPTION, MT. ST. HELENS	DR-623-WA	1980	Volcanic Eruption	
ID	VOLCANIC ERUPTION, MT. ST. HELENS	DR-624-ID	1980	Volcanic Eruption	
NE	SEVERE STORMS & TORNADOES	DR-625-NE	1980	Tornado	
WI	SEVERE STORMS & FLOODING	DR-626-WI	1980	Flood	
TX	HURRICANE ALLEN	DR-627-TX	1980	Hurricane	
WV	SEVERE STORMS & FLOODING	DR-628-WV	1980	Flood	
PA	SEVERE STORMS & FLOODING	DR-629-PA	1980	Flood	
OH	SEVERE STORMS & FLOODING	DR-630-OH	1980	Flood	
MI	SEVERE STORMS & FLOODING	DR-631-MI	1980	Flood	
TX	TROPICAL STORM DANIELLE	DR-632-TX	1980	Flood	
CA	LANDSLIDES	DR-566-CA	1979	Flood	
LA	SEVERE STORMS & TORNADOES	DR-567-LA	1979	Tornado	
KY	SEVERE STORMS & FLOODING	DR-568-KY	1979	Flood	
WV	SEVERE STORMS & FLOODING	DR-569-WV	1979	Flood	
AZ	SEVERE STORMS & FLOODING	DR-570-AZ	1979	Flood	
NM	FLOODING	DR-571-NM	1979	Flood	
HI	SEVERE STORMS & FLOODING	DR-573-HI	1979	Flood	
AR	TORNADO	DR-574-AR	1979	Tornado	
TX	SEVERE STORMS & TORNADOES	DR-575-TX	1979	Tornado	
OK	SEVERE STORMS & TORNADOES	DR-576-OK	1979	Tornado	
MS	STORMS, TORNADOES, FLOODS	DR-577-MS	1979	Severe Storm	
AL	STORMS, WIND, FLOODING	DR-578-AL	1979	Flood	
MO	TORNADOES, TORRENTIAL RAIN & FLOODING	DR-579-MO	1979	Tornado	
TX	SEVERE STORMS, TORNADOES & FLOODING	DR-580-TX	1979	Severe Storm	
ND	SEVERE STORMS, SNOWMELT & FLOODING	DR-581-ND	1979	Flood	
MN	SEVERE STORMS & FLOODING	DR-582-MN	1979	Flood	
IL	SEVERE STORMS & FLOODING	DR-583-IL	1979	Flood	
LA	SEVERE STORMS & FLOODING	DR-584-LA	1979	Flood	
TN	SEVERE STORMS, TORNADOES & FLOODING	DR-585-TN	1979	Severe Storm	
FL	SEVERE STORMS, TORNADOES & FLOODING	DR-586-FL	1979	Severe Storm	
TX	SEVERE STORMS & FLOODING	DR-587-TX	1979	Flood	
KS	SEVERE STORMS & FLOODING	DR-588-KS	1979	Flood	
NM	SEVERE STORMS, SNOWMELT & FLOODING	DR-589-NM	1979	Flood	
IA	HIGH WINDS & TORNADOES	DR-590-IA	1979	Tornado	
WY	SEVERE STORMS & TORNADOES	DR-591-WY	1979	Tornado	
KY	SEVERE STORMS,FLASH FLOODS	DR-592-KY	1979	Flood	
VA	STORMS & FLASH FLOODS	DR-593-VA	1979	Flood	
CA	HEAVY RAINS, FLASH FLOODS & MUD FLOWS	DR-594-CA	1979	Flood	
TX	STORMS & FLASH FLOODS	DR-595-TX	1979	Flood	
IN	SEVERE STORMS & FLOODING	DR-596-IN	1979	Flood	
PR	HURRICANE DAVID	DR-597-PR	1979	Hurricane	
AL	HURRICANE FREDERIC	DR-598-AL	1979	Hurricane	
MS	HURRICANE FREDERIC	DR-599-MS	1979	Hurricane	
FL	HURRICANE FREDERIC	DR-600-FL	1979	Hurricane	
MD	SEVERE STORMS, TORNADOES & FLOODING	DR-601-MD	1979	Severe Storm	
VI	HURRICANE DAVID, TROPICAL STORM FREDERIC	DR-602-VI	1979	Hurricane	
TX	SEVERE STORMS & FLOODING	DR-603-TX	1979	Flood	
LA	SEVERE STORMS & FLOODING	DR-604-LA	1979	Flood	
NC	SEVERE STORMS & FLOODING	DR-605-NC	1979	Flood	
VA	SEVERE STORMS & FLOODING	DR-606-VA	1979	Flood	
FL	SEVERE STORMS & FLOODING	DR-607-FL	1979	Flood	
AZ	SEVERE STORMS & FLOODING	DR-540-AZ	1978	Flood	
GA	DAM COLLAPSE, FLOODING	DR-541-GA	1978	Flood	
NC	SEVERE STORMS & FLOODING	DR-542-NC	1978	Flood	
VA	SEVERE STORMS & FLOODING	DR-543-VA	1978	Flood	
TN	SEVERE STORMS & FLOODING	DR-544-TN	1978	Flood	
WA	SEVERE STORMS,MUDSLIDES, & FLOODING	DR-545-WA	1978	Flood	
MA	COASTAL STORMS, FLOOD, ICE & SNOW	DR-546-MA	1978	Flood	
CA	COASTAL STORMS, MUDSLIDES & FLOODING	DR-547-CA	1978	Flood	
RI	SNOW & ICE	DR-548-RI	1978	Snowstorm	
NH	HIGH WINDS, TIDAL SURGE & COASTAL FLOODING	DR-549-NH	1978	Flood	
ME	HIGH WINDS, TIDAL SURGE & COASTAL FLOODING	DR-550-ME	1978	Flood	
AZ	SEVERE STORMS & FLOODING	DR-551-AZ	1978	Flood	
NE	STORMS, ICE JAMS, SNOWMELT & FLOODING	DR-552-NE	1978	Flood	
IN	SEVERE STORMS & FLOODING	DR-553-IN	1978	Flood	
ND	STORMS, ICE JAMS, SNOWMELT & FLOODING	DR-554-ND	1978	Flood	
MN	STORMS, ICE JAMS, SNOWMELT & FLOODING	DR-555-MN	1978	Flood	
LA	SEVERE STORMS & FLOODING	DR-556-LA	1978	Flood	
WY	SEVERE STORMS, FLOODING & MUDSLIDES	DR-557-WY	1978	Flood	
MT	SEVERE STORMS & FLOODING	DR-558-MT	1978	Flood	
WI	SEVERE STORMS, FLOODING, HAIL & TORNADOES	DR-559-WI	1978	Severe Storm	
MN	SEVERE STORMS, FLOODING, HAIL & TORNADOES	DR-560-MN	1978	Severe Storm	
TX	SEVERE STORMS & FLOODING	DR-561-TX	1978	Flood	
MP	TROPICAL STORM CARMEN	DR-562-MP	1978	Flood	
AL	SEVERE STORMS & FLOODING	DR-563-AL	1978	Flood	
AR	SEVERE STORMS & FLOODING	DR-564-AR	1978	Flood	
LA	SEVERE STORMS & FLOODING	DR-565-LA	1978	Flood	
MD	SEVERE STORMS & FLOODING	DR-522-MD	1977	Flood	
PA	SEVERE STORMS & FLOODING	DR-523-PA	1977	Flood	
MD	ICE CONDITIONS	DR-524-MD	1977	Snowstorm	
VA	ICE CONDITIONS	DR-525-VA	1977	Freezing	
FL	SEVERE WINTER WEATHER	DR-526-FL	1977	Freezing	
NY	SNOWSTORMS	DR-527-NY	1977	Snowstorm	
NJ	ICE CONDITIONS	DR-528-NJ	1977	Severe Ice Storm	
KY	SEVERE STORMS & FLOODING	DR-529-KY	1977	Flood	
VA	SEVERE STORMS & FLOODING	DR-530-VA	1977	Flood	
WV	SEVERE STORMS & FLOODING	DR-531-WV	1977	Flood	
AL	SEVERE STORMS & FLOODING	DR-532-AL	1977	Flood	
TN	SEVERE STORMS & FLOODING	DR-533-TN	1977	Flood	
LA	SEVERE STORMS & FLOODING	DR-534-LA	1977	Flood	
MO	TORNADOES & FLOODING	DR-535-MO	1977	Tornado	
GA	SHRIMP LOSS DUE TO COLD WEATHER	DR-536-GA	1977	Freezing	
PA	SEVERE STORMS & FLOODING	DR-537-PA	1977	Flood	
MO	SEVERE STORMS & FLOODING	DR-538-MO	1977	Flood	
KS	SEVERE STORMS & FLOODING	DR-539-KS	1977	Flood	
NY	STORMS, RAINS, LANDSLIDES & FLOODING	DR-487-NY	1976	Flood	
AL	SEVERE STORMS, TORNADOES & FLOODING	DR-488-AL	1976	Severe Storm	
MD	HEAVY RAINS & FLOODING	DR-489-MD	1976	Flood	
HI	EARTHQUAKE, SEISMIC WAVES & VOLCANIC ERUPTION	DR-490-HI	1976	Earthquake	
OK	SEVERE STORMS & TORNADOES	DR-491-OK	1976	Tornado	
WA	SEVERE STORMS & FLOODING	DR-492-WA	1976	Flood	
AK	FIRE & FREEZING	DR-493-AK	1976	Fire	
NY	ICE STORM,SEVERE STORMS & FLOODING	DR-494-NY	1976	Severe Ice Storm	
MI	SEVERE STORMS, TORNADOES, ICING & FLOODING	DR-495-MI	1976	Severe Storm	
WI	SEVERE STORMS, ICING, WIND & FLOODING	DR-496-WI	1976	Flood	
OK	SEVERE STORMS & TORNADOES	DR-497-OK	1976	Tornado	
AR	TORNADOES	DR-498-AR	1976	Tornado	
MS	SEVERE STORMS, TORNADOES & FLOODING	DR-499-MS	1976	Severe Storm	
NE	ICE STORMS & HIGH WINDS	DR-500-NE	1976	Severe Ice Storm	
ND	FLOODING	DR-501-ND	1976	Flood	
GU	TYPHOON PAMELA	DR-503-GU	1976	Typhoon	
OK	SEVERE STORMS & FLOODING	DR-504-OK	1976	Flood	
ID	DAM COLLAPSE, FLOODING	DR-505-ID	1976	Flood	
GA	SEVERE STORMS & FLOODING	DR-507-GA	1976	Flood	
MP	TYPHOONS PAMELA & THERESE	DR-508-MP	1976	Typhoon	
IL	SEVERE STORMS, TORNADOES & FLOODING	DR-509-IL	1976	Severe Storm	
TX	SEVERE STORMS & FLOODING	DR-510-TX	1976	Flood	
SD	FLASH FLOODING & MUDSLIDES	DR-511-SD	1976	Flood	
NY	FLASH FLOODING	DR-512-NY	1976	Flood	
PA	HIGH WINDS, FLASH FLOODS	DR-513-PA	1976	Flood	
KS	SEVERE STORMS, HIGH WINDS & FLOODING	DR-514-KS	1976	Flood	
NY	SEVERE STORMS & FLOODING	DR-515-NY	1976	Flood	
MO	SEVERE STORMS & FLOODING	DR-516-MO	1976	Flood	
CO	SEVERE STORMS & FLASH FLOODING	DR-517-CO	1976	Flood	
VT	SEVERE STORMS, HIGH WINDS & FLOODING	DR-518-VT	1976	Flood	
NJ	SEVERE STORMS, HIGH WINDS & FLOODING	DR-519-NJ	1976	Flood	
NY	HURRICANE BELLE	DR-520-NY	1976	Hurricane	
CA	FLOODING, TROPICAL STORM KATHLEEN	DR-521-CA	1976	Flood	
LA	SEVERE STORMS	DR-450-LA	1975	Severe Storm	
VI	SEVERE STORMS, LANDSLIDES & FLOODING	DR-451-VI	1975	Flood	
AK	SEVERE STORMS & FLOODING	DR-452-AK	1975	Flood	
OK	SEVERE STORMS & FLOODING	DR-453-OK	1975	Flood	
TX	SEVERE STORMS & FLOODING	DR-454-TX	1975	Flood	
PR	FLOODING	DR-455-PR	1975	Flood	
MS	TORNADOES	DR-456-MS	1975	Tornado	
TX	SEVERE STORMS & FLOODING	DR-457-TX	1975	Flood	
AL	SEVERE STORMS & FLOODING	DR-458-AL	1975	Flood	
TN	SEVERE STORMS & FLOODING	DR-459-TN	1975	Flood	
GA	TORNADOES, HIGH WINDS & HEAVY RAINS	DR-460-GA	1975	Tornado	
KY	SEVERE STORMS & FLOODING	DR-461-KY	1975	Flood	
TX	TORNADOES	DR-462-TX	1975	Tornado	
AR	SEVERE STORMS & TORNADOES	DR-463-AR	1975	Tornado	
AL	SEVERE STORMS & FLOODING	DR-464-AL	1975	Flood	
MI	SEVERE STORMS, HIGH WINDS & FLOODING	DR-465-MI	1975	Flood	
MO	TORNADOES, HIGH WINDS & HAIL	DR-466-MO	1975	Tornado	
NE	SEVERE STORMS & TORNADOES	DR-467-NE	1975	Tornado	
KY	SEVERE STORMS & FLOODING	DR-468-KY	1975	Flood	
ND	FLOODING FROM RAINS & SNOWMELT	DR-469-ND	1975	Flood	
LA	HEAVY RAINS, TORNADOES & FLOODING	DR-470-LA	1975	Severe Storm	
AR	HEAVY RAINS & FLOODING	DR-471-AR	1975	Flood	
MT	RAINS, SHOWMELT, STORMS & FLOODING	DR-472-MT	1975	Flood	
MN	FLOODING	DR-473-MN	1975	Flood	
OK	SEVERE STORMS, FLOODING & TORNADOES	DR-474-OK	1975	Severe Storm	
ND	SEVERE STORMS & FLOODING	DR-475-ND	1975	Flood	
MN	SEVERE STORMS, TORNADOES & FLOODING	DR-476-MN	1975	Severe Storm	
NJ	HEAVY RAINS, HIGH WINDS, HAIL & TORNADOES	DR-477-NJ	1975	Flood	
IL	TORNADO	DR-478-IL	1975	Tornado	
FL	FLOODING	DR-479-FL	1975	Flood	
OH	WINDS, TORNADOES, HEAVY RAINS & FLOODING	DR-480-OH	1975	Flood	
WV	HEAVY RAINS & FLOODING	DR-481-WV	1975	Flood	
WI	HEAVY RAINS, TORNADOES & FLASH FLOODS	DR-482-WI	1975	Severe Storm	
PR	TROPICAL STORM ELIOISE	DR-483-PR	1975	Flood	
FL	HIGH WINDS, HEAVY RAINS & FLOODING	DR-484-FL	1975	Flood	
PA	SEVERE STORMS, HEAVY RAINS & FLOODING	DR-485-PA	1975	Flood	
MI	SEVERE STORMS, HIGH WINDS & FLOODING	DR-486-MI	1975	Flood	

=== 1965 - 1975 ===
State	Name	FEMA disaster code	Year declared	Disaster type	Notes
OK	SEVERE STORMS & FLOODING	DR-404-OK	1974	Flood	
MA	FIRE (CITY OF CHELSEA)	DR-405-MA	1974	Fire	
NE	SEVERE STORMS & FLOODING	DR-406-NE	1974	Flood	
MO	SEVERE STORMS & FLOODING	DR-407-MO	1974	Flood	
AK	HEAVY RAINS & FLOODING	DR-408-AK	1974	Flood	
OK	SEVERE STORMS & FLOODING	DR-409-OK	1974	Flood	
ME	SEVERE STORMS & FLOODING	DR-410-ME	1974	Flood	
NH	HEAVY RAINS & FLOODING	DR-411-NH	1974	Flood	
CA	SEVERE STORMS & FLOODING	DR-412-CA	1974	Flood	
OR	SEVERE STORMS, SNOWMELT & FLOODING	DR-413-OR	1974	Flood	
WA	SEVERE STORMS, SNOWMELT & FLOODING	DR-414-WA	1974	Flood	
ID	SEVERE STORMS, SNOWMELT & FLOODING	DR-415-ID	1974	Flood	
WV	SEVERE STORMS & FLOODING	DR-416-WV	1974	Flood	
MT	SEVERE STORMS, FLOODING & LANDSLIDES	DR-417-MT	1974	Flood	
LA	FLOODING	DR-418-LA	1974	Flood	
OK	HEAVY RAINS & FLOODING	DR-419-OK	1974	Flood	
KY	TORNADOES	DR-420-KY	1974	Tornado	
OH	TORNADOES	DR-421-OH	1974	Tornado	
AL	TORNADOES	DR-422-AL	1974	Tornado	
IN	TORNADOES	DR-423-IN	1974	Tornado	
TN	TORNADOES	DR-424-TN	1974	Tornado	
GA	TORNADOES	DR-425-GA	1974	Tornado	
WV	SEVERE STORMS & FLOODING	DR-426-WV	1974	Flood	
IL	TORNADOES	DR-427-IL	1974	Tornado	
NC	TORNADOES	DR-428-NC	1974	Tornado	
MI	TORNADOES	DR-429-MI	1974	Tornado	
MS	HEAVY RAINS & FLOODING	DR-430-MS	1974	Flood	
WI	TORNADOES	DR-431-WI	1974	Tornado	
CA	SEVERE STORMS & FLOODING	DR-432-CA	1974	Flood	
HI	HEAVY RAINS & FLOODING	DR-433-HI	1974	Flood	
ND	HEAVY RAINS, SNOWMELT & FLOODING	DR-434-ND	1974	Flood	
AR	HEAVY RAINS & FLOODING	DR-435-AR	1974	Flood	
OH	SEVERE STORMS & FLOODING	DR-436-OH	1974	Flood	
AR	SEVERE STORMS & FLOODING	DR-437-AR	1974	Flood	
IL	SEVERE STORMS & FLOODING	DR-438-IL	1974	Flood	
MO	SEVERE STORMS & FLOODING	DR-439-MO	1974	Flood	
MN	HEAVY RAINS & FLOODING	DR-440-MN	1974	Flood	
OK	SEVERE STORMS & FLOODING	DR-441-OK	1974	Flood	
KS	SEVERE STORMS & FLOODING	DR-442-KS	1974	Flood	
IA	SEVERE STORMS & FLOODING	DR-443-IA	1974	Flood	
AK	FREEZE IN SPAWNING AREAS OF RED SALMON	DR-444-AK	1974	Freezing	
OH	HEAVY RAINS & FLOODING	DR-445-OH	1974	Flood	
MN	SEVERE STORMS & FLOODING	DR-446-MN	1974	Flood	
NY	SEVERE STORMS & FLOODING	DR-447-NY	1974	Flood	
LA	HURRICANE CARMEN	DR-448-LA	1974	Hurricane	
AS	DROUGHT	DR-449-AS	1974	Drought	
VA	SEVERE STORMS & FLOODING	DR-358-VA	1973	Flood	
VA	SEVERE STORMS & FLOODING	DR-359-VA	1973	Flood	
AZ	HEAVY RAINS & FLOODING	DR-360-AZ	1973	Flood	
NM	HEAVY RAINS & FLOODING	DR-361-NM	1973	Flood	
OH	SEVERE STORMS & FLOODING	DR-362-OH	1973	Flood	
MI	SEVERE STORMS & FLOODING	DR-363-MI	1973	Flood	
CA	SEVERE STORMS, HIGH TIDES & FLOODING	DR-364-CA	1973	Flood	
TX	HIGH WINDS, TORNADOES AND FLOODING	DR-365-TX	1973	Severe Storm	
TN	HEAVY RAINS & FLOODING	DR-366-TN	1973	Flood	
NY	HIGH WINDS, WAVE ACTION & FLOODING	DR-367-NY	1973	Flood	
MS	HEAVY RAINS, TORNADOES & FLOODING	DR-368-MS	1973	Severe Storm	
AL	TORNADOES & FLOODING	DR-369-AL	1973	Tornado	
GA	TORNADOES & FLOODING	DR-370-GA	1973	Tornado	
MI	SEVERE STORMS & FLOODING	DR-371-MI	1973	Flood	
MO	HEAVY RAINS, TORNADOES & FLOODING	DR-372-MO	1973	Severe Storm	
IL	SEVERE STORMS & FLOODING	DR-373-IL	1973	Flood	
LA	SEVERE STORMS & FLOODING	DR-374-LA	1973	Flood	
AR	SEVERE STORMS & FLOODING	DR-375-AR	1973	Flood	
WI	SEVERE STORMS & FLOODING	DR-376-WI	1973	Flood	
OH	SEVERE STORMS & FLOODING	DR-377-OH	1973	Flood	
KS	SEVERE STORMS & FLOODING	DR-378-KS	1973	Flood	
CO	DAM FAILURE	DR-379-CO	1973	Dam/Levee Break	
NM	SEVERE STORMS, SNOW MELT & FLOODING	DR-380-NM	1973	Flood	
KY	SEVERE STORMS & FLOODING	DR-381-KY	1973	Flood	
TN	SEVERE STORMS & FLOODING	DR-382-TN	1973	Flood	
HI	EARTHQUAKE	DR-383-HI	1973	Earthquake	
ME	HEAVY RAINS & FLOODING	DR-384-ME	1973	Flood	
CO	HEAVY RAINS, SNOWMELT AND FLOODING	DR-385-CO	1973	Flood	
IA	SEVERE STORMS & FLOODING	DR-386-IA	1973	Flood	
FL	SEVERE STORMS & FLOODING	DR-387-FL	1973	Flood	
AL	SEVERE STORMS & FLOODING	DR-388-AL	1973	Flood	
AR	SEVERE STORMS & FLOODING	DR-389-AR	1973	Flood	
OH	MUDSLIDES	DR-390-OH	1973	Mud/Landslide	
GA	SEVERE STORMS & TORNADOES	DR-391-GA	1973	Tornado	
OK	SEVERE STORMS, FLOODING, & TORNADOES	DR-392-OK	1973	Severe Storm	
TX	SEVERE STORMS & FLOODING	DR-393-TX	1973	Flood	
NC	SEVERE STORMS & FLOODING	DR-394-NC	1973	Flood	
TN	SEVERE STORMS & FLOODING	DR-395-TN	1973	Flood	
CO	FLOODING & LANDSLIDES	DR-396-CO	1973	Flood	
VT	SEVERE STORMS, FLOODING, & LANDSLIDES	DR-397-VT	1973	Flood	
TX	SEVERE STORMS & FLOODING	DR-398-TX	1973	Flood	
NH	SEVERE STORMS & FLOODING	DR-399-NH	1973	Flood	
PA	SEVERE STORMS & FLOODING	DR-400-PA	1973	Flood	
NY	SEVERE STORMS & FLOODING	DR-401-NY	1973	Flood	
NJ	SEVERE STORMS & FLOODING	DR-402-NJ	1973	Flood	
KS	SEVERE STORMS, TORNADOES & FLOODING	DR-403-KS	1973	Severe Storm	
LA	HURRICANE EDITH	DR-315-LA	1972	Hurricane	
CA	WINDS, FLOODING, MUDSLIDES	DR-316-CA	1972	Flood	
OK	SEVERE STORMS & FLOODING	DR-317-OK	1972	Flood	
MS	HEAVY RAINS & FLOODING	DR-318-MS	1972	Flood	
OR	SEVERE STORMS & FLOODING	DR-319-OR	1972	Flood	
TX	HEAVY RAINS & FLOODING	DR-320-TX	1972	Flood	
AR	SEVERE STORMS & FLOODING	DR-321-AR	1972	Flood	
WA	SEVERE STORMS & FLOODING	DR-322-WA	1972	Flood	
WV	HEAVY RAINS & FLOODING	DR-323-WV	1972	Flood	
ID	SEVERE STORMS & EXTENSIVE FLOODING	DR-324-ID	1972	Flood	
MA	SEVERE STORMS & FLOODING	DR-325-MA	1972	Flood	
ME	SEVERE STORMS & FLOODING	DR-326-ME	1972	Flood	
NH	COASTAL STORMS	DR-327-NH	1972	Coastal Storm	
WA	HEAVY RAINS & FLOODING	DR-328-WA	1972	Flood	
CA	SEVERE STORMS & FLOODING	DR-329-CA	1972	Flood	
MI	SEVERE STORM & FREEZING	DR-330-MI	1972	Snowstorm	
TN	HEAVY RAINS & FLOODING	DR-331-TN	1972	Flood	
KY	HEAVY RAINS & FLOODING	DR-332-KY	1972	Flood	
TX	SEVERE STORMS & FLOODING	DR-333-TX	1972	Flood	
WA	SEVERE STORMS & FLOODING	DR-334-WA	1972	Flood	
ND	SEVERE STORMS & FLOODING	DR-335-ND	1972	Flood	
SD	HEAVY RAINS & FLOODING	DR-336-SD	1972	Flood	
FL	TROPICAL STORM AGNES	DR-337-FL	1972	Coastal Storm	
NY	TROPICAL STORM AGNES	DR-338-NY	1972	Flood	
VA	TROPICAL STORM AGNES	DR-339-VA	1972	Flood	
PA	TROPICAL STORM AGNES	DR-340-PA	1972	Flood	
MD	TROPICAL STORM AGNES	DR-341-MD	1972	Flood	
CA	FLOODING CAUSED BY LEVEE BREAK	DR-342-CA	1972	Flood	
AZ	SEVERE STORMS & FLOODING	DR-343-AZ	1972	Flood	
WV	TROPICAL STORM AGNES	DR-344-WV	1972	Flood	
OH	TROPICAL STORM AGNES	DR-345-OH	1972	Flood	
NM	SEVERE STORMS & FLOODING	DR-346-NM	1972	Flood	
MN	SEVERE STORMS & FLOODING	DR-347-MN	1972	Flood	
IA	SEVERE STORMS & FLOODING	DR-348-IA	1972	Flood	
WV	HEAVY RAINS & FLOODING	DR-349-WV	1972	Flood	
MN	SEVERE STORMS & FLOODING	DR-350-MN	1972	Flood	
IL	SEVERE STORMS & FLOODING	DR-351-IL	1972	Flood	
WI	HEAVY RAINS & FLOODING	DR-352-WI	1972	Flood	
NM	HEAVY RAINS & FLOODING	DR-353-NM	1972	Flood	
IA	SEVERE STORMS & FLOODING	DR-354-IA	1972	Flood	
PA	HEAVY RAINS & FLOODING	DR-355-PA	1972	Flood	
ME	TOXIC ALGAE IN COASTAL WATERS	DR-356-ME	1972	Fishing Losses	
MA	TOXIC ALGAE IN COASTAL WATERS	DR-357-MA	1972	Fishing Losses	
PR	HEAVY RAINS & FLOODING	DR-296-PR	1971	Flood	
OK	HEAVY RAINS, TORNADOES & FLOODING	DR-297-OK	1971	Severe Storm	
VI	HEAVY RAINS & FLOODING	DR-298-VI	1971	Flood	
CA	SAN FERNANDO EARTHQUAKE	DR-299-CA	1971	Earthquake	
WA	HEAVY RAINS, MELTING SNOWS & FLOODING	DR-300-WA	1971	Flood	
OR	STORMS & FLOODING	DR-301-OR	1971	Flood	
MS	STORMS & TORNADOES	DR-302-MS	1971	Tornado	
NE	FLOODS	DR-303-NE	1971	Flood	
FL	FREEZE	DR-304-FL	1971	Freezing	
KY	TORNADO	DR-305-KY	1971	Tornado	
TN	TORNADO	DR-306-TN	1971	Tornado	
FM	TYPHOON AMY	DR-307-FM	1971	Typhoon	
NE	FLOODS	DR-308-NE	1971	Flood	
MD	SEVERE STORMS & FLOODING	DR-309-MD	1971	Flood	
NJ	HEAVY RAINS & FLOODING	DR-310-NJ	1971	Flood	
NY	SEVERE STORMS & FLOODING	DR-311-NY	1971	Flood	
PA	FLOODS	DR-312-PA	1971	Flood	
TX	HEAVY RAINS, HIGH WINDS & FLOODING	DR-313-TX	1971	Flood	
OK	HEAVY RAINS & FLOODS	DR-314-OK	1971	Flood	
AL	HURRICANE CAMILLE	DR-280-AL	1970	Hurricane	
AK	HEAVY RAINS & LANDSLIDE	DR-281-AK	1970	Severe Storm	
KY	HEAVY SNOWMELT, RAINS & FLOODING	DR-282-KY	1970	Flood	
CA	SEVERE STORMS & FLOODING	DR-283-CA	1970	Flood	
ME	SEVERE STORMS, ICE JAMS & FLOODING	DR-284-ME	1970	Flood	
AL	HEAVY RAINS, TORNADOES & FLOODING	DR-285-AL	1970	Severe Storm	
TX	TORNADOES, WINDSTORMS & FLOODING	DR-286-TX	1970	Tornado	
ND	SEVERE STORMS & FLOODING	DR-287-ND	1970	Flood	
KY	SEVERE STORMS & FLOODING	DR-288-KY	1970	Flood	
FL	HEAVY RAINS & FLOODING	DR-289-FL	1970	Flood	
NY	HEAVY RAINS & FLOODING	DR-290-NY	1970	Flood	
MN	HEAVY RAINS & FLOODING	DR-291-MN	1970	Flood	
TX	HURRICANE CELIA	DR-292-TX	1970	Hurricane	
CO	HEAVY RAINS & FLOODING	DR-293-CO	1970	Flood	
AZ	HEAVY RAINS & FLASH	DR-294-AZ	1970	Flood	
CA	FOREST & BRUSH FIRES	DR-295-CA	1970	Fire	
FL	HURRICANE GLADYS	DR-252-FL	1969	Hurricane	
CA	SEVERE STORMS & FLOODING	DR-253-CA	1969	Flood	
AR	SEVERE STORMS & FLOODING	DR-254-AR	1969	Flood	
MN	FLOODING	DR-255-MN	1969	Flood	
ND	FLOODING	DR-256-ND	1969	Flood	
SD	FLOODING	DR-257-SD	1969	Flood	
NV	FLOODING	DR-258-NV	1969	Flood	
IA	FLOODING	DR-259-IA	1969	Flood	
WI	FLOODING	DR-260-WI	1969	Flood	
CO	SEVERE STORMS & FLOODING	DR-261-CO	1969	Flood	
IL	FLOODING	DR-262-IL	1969	Flood	
TN	SEVERE STORMS & FLOODING	DR-263-TN	1969	Flood	
WI	SEVERE STORMS & FLOODING	DR-264-WI	1969	Flood	
KY	SEVERE STORMS & FLOODING	DR-265-KY	1969	Flood	
OH	TORNADOES, SEVERE STORMS & FLOODING	DR-266-OH	1969	Tornado	
KS	TORNADOES, SEVERE STORMS & FLOODING	DR-267-KS	1969	Tornado	
MN	HEAVY RAINS & FLOODING	DR-268-MN	1969	Flood	
IA	HEAVY RAINS & FLOODING	DR-269-IA	1969	Flood	
CA	FLOODING	DR-270-CA	1969	Flood	
MS	HURRICANE CAMILLE	DR-271-MS	1969	Hurricane	
LA	HURRICANE CAMILLE	DR-272-LA	1969	Hurricane	
PA	SEVERE STORMS & FLOODING	DR-273-PA	1969	Flood	
VA	SEVERE STORMS & FLOODING	DR-274-VA	1969	Hurricane	
NY	HEAVY RAINS & FLOODING	DR-275-NY	1969	Flood	
IL	HEAVY RAINS & FLOODING	DR-276-IL	1969	Flood	
VT	SEVERE STORMS & FLOODING	DR-277-VT	1969	Flood	
WV	SEVERE STORMS & FLOODING	DR-278-WV	1969	Hurricane	
WV	SEVERE STORMS & FLOODING	DR-279-WV	1969	Flood	
NY	SEVERE STORMS & FLOODING	DR-233-NY	1968	Flood	
NC	SEVERE ICE STORM	DR-234-NC	1968	Severe Ice Storm	
AR	TORNADO & SEVERE STORM	DR-236-AR	1968	Tornado	
KY	TORNADOES & SEVERE STORMS	DR-237-KY	1968	Tornado	
OH	TORNADOES & SEVERE STORMS	DR-238-OH	1968	Tornado	
AR	TORNADOES, SEVERE STORMS & FLOODING	DR-239-AR	1968	Tornado	
IA	TORNADOES & SEVERE STORMS	DR-240-IA	1968	Tornado	
OK	HEAVY RAINS & FLOODING	DR-241-OK	1968	Flood	
IL	TORNADOES, SEVERE STORMS & FLOODING	DR-242-IL	1968	Tornado	
OH	HEAVY RAINS & FLOODING	DR-243-OH	1968	Flood	
TX	HEAVY RAINS & FLOODING	DR-244-TX	1968	Flood	
NJ	HEAVY RAINS & FLOODING	DR-245-NJ	1968	Flood	
TX	SEVERE STORMS, HIGH WINDS & FLOODING	DR-246-TX	1968	Flood	
IN	FLOODING	DR-247-IN	1968	Flood	
IA	HEAVY RAINS & FLOODING	DR-248-IA	1968	Flood	
MN	HEAVY RAINS & FLOODING	DR-249-MN	1968	Flood	
MN	HEAVY RAINS & FLOODING	DR-250-MN	1968	Flood	
HI	HEAVY RAINS & FLOODING	DR-251-HI	1968	Flood	
CA	SEVERE STORMS & FLOODING	DR-223-CA	1967	Flood	
WV	FLOODING	DR-224-WV	1967	Flood	
KY	SEVERE STORMS & FLOODING	DR-226-KY	1967	Flood	
IL	TORNADOES	DR-227-IL	1967	Tornado	
NE	SEVERE STORMS & FLOODING	DR-228-NE	1967	Flood	
KS	TORNADOES, SEVERE STORMS & FLOODING	DR-229-KS	1967	Tornado	
AK	SEVERE STORMS & FLOODING	DR-230-AK	1967	Flood	
ID	FOREST FIRES	DR-231-ID	1967	Fire	
TX	HURRICANE BEULAH	DR-232-TX	1967	Hurricane	
CA	HEAVY RAINS & FLOODING	DR-211-CA	1966	Flood	
CA	SEVERE STORMS & FLOODING	DR-212-CA	1966	Flood	
AS	TYPHOON & HIGH TIDES	DR-213-AS	1966	Typhoon	
GA	FLOODING	DR-214-GA	1966	Flood	
MN	FLOODING	DR-215-MN	1966	Flood	
ND	FLOODING	DR-216-ND	1966	Flood	
AZ	FLOODING	DR-217-AZ	1966	Flood	
TX	SEVERE STORMS & FLOODING	DR-218-TX	1966	Flood	
KS	TORNADOES & SEVERE STORMS	DR-219-KS	1966	Tornado	
ND	SEVERE STORMS & FLOODING	DR-220-ND	1966	Flood	
NE	HEAVY RAINS & FLOODING	DR-221-NE	1966	Flood	
TX	HEAVY RAINS & FLOODING	DR-222-TX	1966	Flood	
LA	HURRICANE HILDA	DR-178-LA	1965	Hurricane	
NC	SEVERE STORMS & FLOODING	DR-179-NC	1965	Flood	
GA	FLOODING	DR-180-GA	1965	Flood	
FM	TYPHOON LOUISE	DR-181-FM	1965	Typhoon	
MT	SEVERE WINTER STORM	DR-182-MT	1965	Snowstorm	
CA	HEAVY RAINS & FLOODING	DR-183-CA	1965	Flood	
OR	HEAVY RAINS & FLOODING	DR-184-OR	1965	Flood	
WA	HEAVY RAINS & FLOODING	DR-185-WA	1965	Flood	
ID	HEAVY RAINS & FLOODING	DR-186-ID	1965	Flood	
NV	SEVERE STORMS, HEAVY RAINS & FLOODING	DR-187-NV	1965	Flood	
MN	FLOODING	DR-188-MN	1965	Flood	
IN	TORNADOES & SEVERE STORMS	DR-189-IN	1965	Tornado	
MI	TORNADOES & SEVERE STORMS	DR-190-MI	1965	Tornado	
OH	TORNADOES & SEVERE STORMS	DR-191-OH	1965	Tornado	
WI	TORNADOES, SEVERE STORMS & FLOODING	DR-192-WI	1965	Tornado	
IA	FLOODING	DR-193-IA	1965	Flood	
IL	TORNADOES, SEVERE STORMS & FLOODING	DR-194-IL	1965	Tornado	
ND	FLOODING	DR-195-ND	1965	Flood	
WA	EARTHQUAKE	DR-196-WA	1965	Earthquake	
SD	FLOODING	DR-197-SD	1965	Flood	
MO	FLOODING	DR-198-MO	1965	Severe Storm	
TX	TORNADOES & FLOODING	DR-199-TX	1965	Tornado	
CO	TORNADOES, SEVERE STORMS & FLOODING	DR-200-CO	1965	Tornado	
KS	FLOODING	DR-201-KS	1965	Flood	
NM	SEVERE STORMS & FLOODING	DR-202-NM	1965	Flood	
MO	SEVERE STORMS & FLOODING	DR-203-MO	1965	Flood	
NY	WATER SHORTAGE	DR-204-NY	1965	Drought	
NJ	WATER SHORTAGE	DR-205-NJ	1965	Drought	
PA	WATER SHORTAGE	DR-206-PA	1965	Drought	
DE	WATER SHORTAGE	DR-207-DE	1965	Drought	
LA	HURRICANE BETSY	DR-208-LA	1965	Hurricane	
FL	HURRICANE BETSY	DR-209-FL	1965	Hurricane	
MS	HURRICANE BETSY	DR-210-MS	1965	Hurricane	

=== 1950 - 1965 ===
State	Name	FEMA disaster code	Year declared	Disaster type	Notes
VT	DROUGHT & IMPENDING FREEZE	DR-160-VT	1964	Drought	
CA	FLOOD DUE TO BROKEN DAM	DR-161-CA	1964	Dam/Levee Break	
IN	SEVERE STORMS & FLOODING	DR-162-IN	1964	Flood	
KY	SEVERE STORMS & FLOODING	DR-163-KY	1964	Flood	
VT	FLOODING	DR-164-VT	1964	Flood	
WV	SEVERE STORMS & FLOODING	DR-165-WV	1964	Flood	
AR	SEVERE STORMS & FLOODING	DR-166-AR	1964	Flood	
OH	SEVERE STORMS & FLOODING	DR-167-OH	1964	Flood	
AK	EARTHQUAKE	DR-168-AK	1964	Earthquake	
CA	SEISMIC SEA WAVE	DR-169-CA	1964	Other	
PR	EXTREME DROUGHT CONDITIONS	DR-170-PR	1964	Drought	
VI	EXTREME DROUGHT CONDITIONS	DR-171-VI	1964	Drought	
MT	HEAVY RAINS & FLOODING	DR-172-MT	1964	Flood	
MO	SEVERE STORMS & FLOODING	DR-173-MO	1964	Flood	
NE	SEVERE STORMS & FLOODING	DR-174-NE	1964	Flood	
FL	HURRICANE CLEO	DR-175-FL	1964	Hurricane	
FL	HURRICANE DORA	DR-176-FL	1964	Hurricane	
GA	HURRICANE DORA	DR-177-GA	1964	Hurricane	
MS	CHLORINE BARGE ACCIDENT	DR-135-MS	1963	Toxic Substances	
OR	SEVERE STORMS	DR-136-OR	1963	Severe Storm	
WA	SEVERE STORMS	DR-137-WA	1963	Severe Storm	
CA	SEVERE STORMS & FLOODING	DR-138-CA	1963	Flood	
LA	CHLORINE BARGE ACCIDENT	DR-139-LA	1963	Toxic Substances	
GU	TYPHOON KAREN	DR-140-GU	1963	Typhoon	
FL	ABNORMALLY HIGH TIDES	DR-141-FL	1963	Flood	
NV	FLOODS	DR-142-NV	1963	Flood	
ID	FLOODS	DR-143-ID	1963	Flood	
OR	FLOODS	DR-144-OR	1963	Flood	
CA	SEVERE STORMS, HEAVY RAINS & FLOODING	DR-145-CA	1963	Flood	
WA	FLOODS	DR-146-WA	1963	Flood	
WV	SEVERE STORMS & FLOODING	DR-147-WV	1963	Flood	
KY	SEVERE STORMS & FLOODING	DR-148-KY	1963	Flood	
VA	FLOODS	DR-149-VA	1963	Flood	
GA	SEVERE STORMS & FLOODING	DR-150-GA	1963	Flood	
TN	SEVERE STORMS & FLOODING	DR-151-TN	1963	Flood	
HI	HEAVY RAINS & FLOODING	DR-152-HI	1963	Flood	
GU	TYPHOON OLIVE	DR-153-GU	1963	Typhoon	
FM	TYPHOON OLIVE	DR-154-FM	1963	Typhoon	
WY	HEAVY RAINS & FLOODING	DR-155-WY	1963	Flood	
NE	HEAVY RAINS & FLOODING	DR-156-NE	1963	Flood	
AR	HEAVY RAINS & FLOODING	DR-157-AR	1963	Flood	
NY	HEAVY RAINS & FLOODING	DR-158-NY	1963	Flood	
TX	HURRICANE CINDY	DR-159-TX	1963	Hurricane	
CA	FIRE (LOS ANGELES COUNTY)	DR-119-CA	1962	Fire	
ID	FLOODS	DR-120-ID	1962	Flood	
NV	FLOODS	DR-121-NV	1962	Flood	
CA	FLOODS	DR-122-CA	1962	Flood	
VA	SEVERE STORMS, HIGH TIDES & FLOODING	DR-123-VA	1962	Flood	
NJ	SEVERE STORM, HIGH TIDES & FLOODING	DR-124-NJ	1962	Flood	
WV	SEVERE STORM, HIGH TIDES & FLOODING	DR-125-WV	1962	Flood	
DE	SEVERE STORMS, HIGH TIDES & FLOODING	DR-126-DE	1962	Flood	
MD	SEVERE STORMS, HIGH TIDES & FLOODING	DR-127-MD	1962	Flood	
KY	FLOODS	DR-128-KY	1962	Flood	
NY	SEVERE STORM, HIGH TIDES & FLOODING	DR-129-NY	1962	Flood	
NC	SEVERE STORM, HIGH TIDES & FLOODING	DR-130-NC	1962	Flood	
NE	FLOODS	DR-131-NE	1962	Flood	
SD	FLOODS & TORNADOES	DR-132-SD	1962	Flood	
IA	FLOODS	DR-133-IA	1962	Flood	
NE	FLOODS	DR-134-NE	1962	Flood	
MS	FLOODS	DR-108-MS	1961	Flood	
AL	FLOODS	DR-109-AL	1961	Flood	
GA	FLOODS	DR-110-GA	1961	Flood	
IA	FLOODS	DR-111-IA	1961	Flood	
AR	FLOODS & TORNADOES	DR-112-AR	1961	Flood	
IN	FLOODS	DR-113-IN	1961	Flood	
MO	FLOODS	DR-114-MO	1961	Flood	
IL	FLOODS & TORNADOES	DR-115-IL	1961	Flood	
ID	FLOODS	DR-116-ID	1961	Flood	
WV	FLOODS	DR-117-WV	1961	Flood	
TX	HURRICANE CARLA	DR-118-TX	1961	Hurricane	
MO	FLOODS	DR-100-MO	1960	Flood	
HI	TIDAL WAVES	DR-101-HI	1960	Other	
AR	TORNADOES & FLOODS	DR-102-AR	1960	Tornado	
TX	HEAVY RAINS, HAIL, FLOODS & TORNADOES	DR-103-TX	1960	Severe Storm	
OK	HEAVY RAINS, HAIL, FLOODS & TORNADOES	DR-104-OK	1960	Severe Storm	
ID	FIRES	DR-105-ID	1960	Fire	
FL	HURRICANE DONNA	DR-106-FL	1960	Hurricane	
NC	HURRICANE DONNA	DR-107-NC	1960	Hurricane	
OK	HEAVY RAINS & FLOODS	DR-95-OK	1960	Flood	
HI	EARTHQUAKES & VOLCANIC DISTURBANCES	DR-96-HI	1960	Earthquake	
FL	SEVERE WEATHER CONDITIONS	DR-97-FL	1960	Other	
NE	FLOODS	DR-98-NE	1960	Flood	
SD	FLOODS	DR-99-SD	1960	Flood	
NC	HURRICANE & SEVERE STORM	DR-87-NC	1959	Hurricane	
KS	FLOODS	DR-88-KS	1959	Flood	
PA	FLOODS	DR-89-PA	1959	Flood	
OH	FLOODS	DR-90-OH	1959	Flood	
IN	FLOOD	DR-91-IN	1959	Flood	
OK	FLOOD	DR-92-OK	1959	Flood	
TX	FLOODS	DR-93-TX	1959	Flood	
HI	HURRICANE DOT	DR-94-HI	1959	Hurricane	
CA	HEAVY RAINSTORMS & FLOOD	DR-82-CA	1958	Flood	
AR	HEAVY RAINSTORMS & FLOODS	DR-83-AR	1958	Flood	
LA	FLOODS	DR-84-LA	1958	Flood	
TX	TORNADOES, RAIN, HAIL & FLOODS	DR-85-TX	1958	Tornado	
IA	FLOODS	DR-86-IA	1958	Flood	
LA	HURRICANE	DR-64-LA	1957	Hurricane	
CA	FOREST FIRE	DR-65-CA	1957	Fire	
KY	FLOOD	DR-66-KY	1957	Flood	
WV	FLOOD	DR-67-WV	1957	Flood	
VA	FLOODS	DR-68-VA	1957	Flood	
OR	FLOOD	DR-69-OR	1957	Flood	
WA	FLOODS	DR-70-WA	1957	Flood	
HI	TIDAL WAVE	DR-71-HI	1957	Other	
TX	HURRICANE, RAIN, WIND, HAIL & FLOODS	DR-72-TX	1957	Hurricane	
LA	FLOODS & HURRICANE	DR-73-LA	1957	Hurricane	
OK	FLOOD	DR-74-OK	1957	Flood	
MO	TORNADOES & FLOODS	DR-75-MO	1957	Tornado	
ID	FLOOD	DR-76-ID	1957	Flood	
AR	TORNADOES, RAIN, HAIL & FLOODS	DR-77-AR	1957	Tornado	
IL	FLOODS	DR-78-IL	1957	Flood	
ND	TORNADO	DR-79-ND	1957	Tornado	
MN	FLOODS	DR-80-MN	1957	Flood	
KS	FLOODS	DR-81-KS	1957	Flood	
AK	SEVERE HARDSHIP	DR-46-AK	1956	Other	
CA	FLOOD	DR-47-CA	1956	Flood	
NV	FLOOD	DR-48-NV	1956	Flood	
OR	FLOOD	DR-49-OR	1956	Flood	
WA	FLOOD	DR-50-WA	1956	Flood	
PA	FLOOD	DR-51-PA	1956	Flood	
NY	FLOOD	DR-52-NY	1956	Flood	
MI	TORNADO	DR-53-MI	1956	Tornado	
OK	TORNADOES	DR-54-OK	1956	Tornado	
ID	FLOODS	DR-55-ID	1956	Flood	
NC	SEVERE STORM	DR-56-NC	1956	Severe Storm	
OH	WIND STORM	DR-57-OH	1956	Other	
PA	SEVERE STORM	DR-58-PA	1956	Severe Storm	
CO	FLOOD	DR-59-CO	1956	Flood	
OR	STORM & FLOOD	DR-60-OR	1956	Flood	
PA	STORM	DR-61-PA	1956	Severe Storm	
PR	HURRICANE	DR-62-PR	1956	Hurricane	
NV	FLOOD	DR-63-NV	1956	Flood	
NY	HURRICANES	DR-26-NY	1955	Hurricane	
NM	FLOOD	DR-27-NM	1955	Flood	
NC	HURRICANE	DR-28-NC	1955	Hurricane	
SC	HURRICANE	DR-29-SC	1955	Hurricane	
IN	FLOOD	DR-30-IN	1955	Flood	
AK	SEVERE HARDSHIP	DR-31-AK	1955	Other	
HI	VOLCANO	DR-32-HI	1955	Volcanic Eruption	
CO	FLOOD	DR-33-CO	1955	Flood	
KS	TORNADO	DR-34-KS	1955	Tornado	
OK	FLOOD & TORNADO	DR-35-OK	1955	Flood	
NV	FLOOD	DR-36-NV	1955	Flood	
NC	HURRICANES	DR-37-NC	1955	Hurricane	
NM	FLOOD	DR-38-NM	1955	Flood	
RI	HURRICANE & FLOOD	DR-39-RI	1955	Hurricane	
PA	FLOODS & RAINS	DR-40-PA	1955	Flood	
NJ	HURRICANE & FLOODS	DR-41-NJ	1955	Hurricane	
CT	HURRICANE, TORRENTIAL RAIN & FLOODS	DR-42-CT	1955	Hurricane	
MA	HURRICANE & FLOODS	DR-43-MA	1955	Hurricane	
SC	HURRICANES	DR-44-SC	1955	Hurricane	
NY	HURRICANE & FLOODS	DR-45-NY	1955	Hurricane	
FL	FLOOD	DR-12-FL	1954	Flood	
AK	SEVERE HARDSHIP	DR-13-AK	1954	Other	
MS	TORNADO	DR-14-MS	1954	Tornado	
CA	FLOOD & EROSION	DR-15-CA	1954	Flood	
GA	TORNADO	DR-16-GA	1954	Tornado	
IA	FLOOD	DR-17-IA	1954	Flood	
TX	FLOOD	DR-18-TX	1954	Flood	
NV	EARTHQUAKE	DR-19-NV	1954	Earthquake	
SD	FLOOD	DR-20-SD	1954	Flood	
WV	FLOOD	DR-21-WV	1954	Flood	
MA	HURRICANES	DR-22-MA	1954	Hurricane	
RI	HURRICANES	DR-23-RI	1954	Hurricane	
ME	HURRICANES	DR-24-ME	1954	Hurricane	
CT	HURRICANES	DR-25-CT	1954	Hurricane	
GA	TORNADO	DR-1-GA	1953	Tornado	
NH	FOREST FIRE	DR-11-NH	1953	Fire	
TX	TORNADO & HEAVY RAINFALL	DR-2-TX	1953	Tornado	
LA	FLOOD	DR-3-LA	1953	Flood	
MI	TORNADO	DR-4-MI	1953	Tornado	
MT	FLOODS	DR-5-MT	1953	Flood	
MI	TORNADO	DR-6-MI	1953	Tornado	
MA	TORNADO	DR-7-MA	1953	Tornado	
IA	FLOOD	DR-8-IA	1953	Flood	
TX	FLOOD	DR-9-TX	1953	Flood	

== Fire management assistance grants (FMAGs) ==
=== 2015 - 2025 ===
State	Name	FEMA disaster code	Year declared	Notes
AK	HIMALAYA ROAD FIRE	FM-5596-AK	2025	
AK	BEAR CREEK FIRE	FM-5595-AK	2025	
NM	COTTON 2 FIRE	FM-5594-NM	2025	
NM	COTTON FIRE	FM-5593-NM	2025	
UT	FORSYTH FIRE	FM-5591-UT	2025	
NV	CONNER FIRE	FM-5592-NV	2025	
OR	UPPER APPLEGATE ROAD FIRE	FM-5590-OR	2025	
OR	ALDER SPRINGS FIRE	FM-5589-OR	2025	
NM	TROUT FIRE	FM-5588-NM	2025	
OR	ROWENA FIRE	FM-5587-OR	2025	
NV	MARIE FIRE	FM-5586-NV	2025	
AZ	CODY FIRE	FM-5585-AZ	2025	
MN	MUNGER SHAW FIRE	FM-5583-MN	2025	
AZ	GREER FIRE	FM-5584-AZ	2025	
NC	SUNSET DRIVE FIRE	FM-5582-NC	2025	
NJ	JONES ROAD FIRE	FM-5581-NJ	2025	
NC	SAM DAVIS ROAD FIRE	FM-5580-NC	2025	
NM	RIO GRANDE FIRE	FM-5579-NM	2025	
NC	TABLE ROCK FIRE	FM-5578-NC	2025	
NC	ALARKA FIRE	FM-5577-NC	2025	
SC	TABLE ROCK FIRE COMPLEX	FM-5576-SC	2025	
SC	TABLE ROCK FIRE	FM-5575-SC	2025	
NC	BLACK COVE FIRE COMPLEX	FM-5574-NC	2025	
TX	PAULINE ROAD FIRE	FM-5573-TX	2025	
OK	328 FIRE	FM-5572-OK	2025	
TX	DOUBLE S FIRE	FM-5571-TX	2025	
OK	WILDHORSE FIRE	FM-5564-OK	2025	
OK	BARN FIRE	FM-5568-OK	2025	
OK	EAST THUNDERBIRD FIRE	FM-5563-OK	2025	
OK	UNDERWOOD FIRE	FM-5566-OK	2025	
OK	CLEAR POND FIRE	FM-5565-OK	2025	
OK	NORGE FIRE	FM-5569-OK	2025	
OK	840 ROAD FIRE	FM-5557-OK	2025	
OK	LUTHER FIRE	FM-5562-OK	2025	
OK	LOGAN FIRE	FM-5561-OK	2025	
KS	YATES CENTER FIRE	FM-5556-KS	2025	
OK	LITTLE SALT CREEK FIRE	FM-5560-OK	2025	
TX	REST AREA FIRE	FM-5555-TX	2025	
SC	COVINGTON DRIVE FIRE	FM-5554-SC	2025	
TX	DUKE FIRE	FM-5553-TX	2025	
TX	WELDER FIRE	FM-5552-TX	2025	
CA	HURST FIRE	FM-5551-CA	2025	
CA	EATON FIRE	FM-5550-CA	2025	
CA	PALISADES FIRE	FM-5549-CA	2025	
CA	FRANKLIN FIRE	FM-5548-CA	2024	
ND	BEAR DEN FIRE	FM-5540-ND	2024	
ND	ELK HORN FIRE	FM-5541-ND	2024	
CT	HAWTHORNE FIRE	FM-5542-CT	2024	
OK	EUCHEE CREEK FIRE	FM-5543-OK	2024	
OK	NORTH ROAD FIRE	FM-5544-OK	2024	
CA	MOUNTAIN FIRE	FM-5545-CA	2024	
NV	CALLAHAN FIRE	FM-5546-NV	2024	
NY	JENNINGS CREEK FIRE	FM-5547-NY	2024	
TX	WINDY DEUCE FIRE	FM-5487-TX	2024	
TX	SMOKEHOUSE CREEK FIRE	FM-5488-TX	2024	
OK	CATESBY FIRE	FM-5489-OK	2024	
WY	HAPPY JACK FIRE	FM-5490-WY	2024	
OK	57 FIRE	FM-5491-OK	2024	
NM	BLUE 2 FIRE	FM-5492-NM	2024	
AZ	SIMMONS FIRE	FM-5493-AZ	2024	
NV	TRAIL FIRE	FM-5494-NV	2024	
NV	SULLIVAN FIRE	FM-5495-NV	2024	
AZ	ROSE FIRE	FM-5496-AZ	2024	
NM	SOUTH FORK FIRE	FM-5497-NM	2024	
NM	SALT FIRE	FM-5498-NM	2024	
WA	SLIDE RANCH FIRE	FM-5499-WA	2024	
OR	DARLENE 3 FIRE	FM-5500-OR	2024	
AZ	BOULDER VIEW FIRE	FM-5501-AZ	2024	
CA	THOMPSON FIRE	FM-5502-CA	2024	
CA	FRENCH FIRE	FM-5503-CA	2024	
UT	SILVER KING FIRE	FM-5504-UT	2024	
AZ	SHAKE FIRE	FM-5505-AZ	2024	
OR	LARCH CREEK FIRE	FM-5506-OR	2024	
MT	HORSE GULCH FIRE	FM-5507-MT	2024	
AZ	WATCH FIRE	FM-5508-AZ	2024	
NV	SPRING VALLEY FIRE	FM-5509-NV	2024	
ID	TEXAS FIRE	FM-5510-ID	2024	
OR	LONE ROCK FIRE	FM-5511-OR	2024	
OR	FALLS FIRE	FM-5512-OR	2024	
OR	BONEYARD FIRE	FM-5513-OR	2024	
OR	BATTLE MOUNTAIN FIRE COMPLEX	FM-5514-OR	2024	
CA	HAWARDEN FIRE	FM-5515-CA	2024	
OR	DURKEE FIRE	FM-5516-OR	2024	
WA	WEST WHITE SWAN FIRE	FM-5517-WA	2024	
WA	SWAWILLA FIRE	FM-5518-WA	2024	
CA	PARK FIRE	FM-5519-CA	2024	
ID	GWEN FIRE	FM-5520-ID	2024	
WA	RETREAT FIRE	FM-5521-WA	2024	
CA	BOREL FIRE	FM-5522-CA	2024	
WY	PLEASANT VALLEY FIRE	FM-5523-WY	2024	
CO	ALEXANDER MOUNTAIN FIRE	FM-5524-CO	2024	
CO	STONE MOUNTAIN FIRE	FM-5525-CO	2024	
CO	QUARRY FIRE	FM-5526-CO	2024	
OR	MILE MARKER 132 FIRE	FM-5527-OR	2024	
OR	ELK LANE FIRE	FM-5528-OR	2024	
OR	LEE FALLS FIRE	FM-5529-OR	2024	
NV	GOLD RANCH FIRE	FM-5530-NV	2024	
WY	HOUSE DRAW FIRE	FM-5531-WY	2024	
OR	COPPERFIELD FIRE	FM-5532-OR	2024	
NV	DAVIS FIRE	FM-5533-NV	2024	
OR	RAIL RIDGE FIRE	FM-5534-OR	2024	
CA	LINE FIRE	FM-5535-CA	2024	
CA	BOYLES FIRE	FM-5536-CA	2024	
CA	BRIDGE FIRE	FM-5537-CA	2024	
CA	AIRPORT FIRE	FM-5538-CA	2024	
WY	ELK FIRE	FM-5539-WY	2024	
WA	NAKIA CREEK FIRE	FM-5456-WA	2023	
OR	CEDAR CREEK FIRE	FM-5457-OR	2023	
OK	SIMPSON FIRE, OKLAHOMA FMAG	FM-5458-OK	2023	
OK	HEFNER FIRE, OKLAHOMA FMAG	FM-5459-OK	2023	
OK	GAP ROAD FIRE, OKLAHOMA FMAG	FM-5460-OK	2023	
NM	ECHO RIDGE FIRE, NM FMAG	FM-5461-NM	2023	
NE	WACONDA-BEAVER LAKE FIRE COMPLEX	FM-5462-NE	2023	
KS	HADDAM FIRE	FM-5463-KS	2023	
RI	QUEENS RIVER FIRE	FM-5464-RI	2023	
NM	LAS TUSAS FIRE	FM-5465-NM	2023	
AZ	DIAMOND FIRE	FM-5466-AZ	2023	
WA	TUNNEL FIVE FIRE	FM-5467-WA	2023	
WA	MCEWAN FIRE	FM-5468-WA	2023	
WA	BAIRD SPRINGS FIRE	FM-5469-WA	2023	
WA	NEWELL ROAD FIRE	FM-5470-WA	2023	
OR	GOLDEN FIRE	FM-5471-OR	2023	
WA	EAGLE BLUFF FIRE	FM-5472-WA	2023	
AK	LOST HORSE CREEK FIRE	FM-5473-AK	2023	
HI	KOHALA RANCH FIRE	FM-5474-HI	2023	
HI	LAHAINA FIRE	FM-5475-HI	2023	
HI	UPCOUNTRY FIRE	FM-5476-HI	2023	
HI	PULEHU FIRE	FM-5477-HI	2023	
HI	MAUNA KEA BEACH FIRE	FM-5478-HI	2023	
WA	GRAY FIRE	FM-5479-WA	2023	
MT	RIVER ROAD EAST FIRE	FM-5480-MT	2023	
WA	OREGON FIRE	FM-5481-WA	2023	
LA	TIGER ISLAND FIRE	FM-5482-LA	2023	
OR	LIBERTY FIRE	FM-5483-OR	2023	
LA	IDA FIRE	FM-5484-LA	2023	
LA	LIONS CAMP ROAD FIRE	FM-5485-LA	2023	
LA	HIGHWAY 113 FIRE	FM-5486-LA	2023	
SD	AUBURN FIRE	FM-5418-SD	2022	
CA	ALISAL FIRE	FM-5419-CA	2022	
TX	COUNTY LINE FIRE	FM-5420-TX	2022	
OK	COBB FIRE	FM-5421-OK	2022	
TX	NORTH 207 FIRE	FM-5422-TX	2022	
CO	MARSHALL FIRE	FM-5423-CO	2022	
FL	1707 ADKINS AVE FIRE	FM-5424-FL	2022	
KS	COTTONWOOD FIRE COMPLEX	FM-5425-KS	2022	
FL	CHIPOLA FIRE COMPLEX	FM-5426-FL	2022	
TX	KIDD FIRE	FM-5427-TX	2022	
TX	WHEAT FIELD FIRE	FM-5428-TX	2022	
TX	BIG L FIRE	FM-5429-TX	2022	
NM	BIG HOLE FIRE	FM-5430-NM	2022	
NM	HERMIT'S PEAK FIRE	FM-5431-NM	2022	
NM	MCBRIDE FIRE	FM-5432-NM	2022	
NM	NOGAL CANYON FIRE	FM-5433-NM	2022	
AZ	TUNNEL 2 FIRE	FM-5434-AZ	2022	
AZ	CROOKS FIRE	FM-5435-AZ	2022	
NE	ROAD 702 FIRE	FM-5436-NE	2022	
NM	COOK'S PEAK FIRE	FM-5437-NM	2022	
NM	CALF CANYON FIRE	FM-5438-NM	2022	
CA	COASTAL FIRE	FM-5439-CA	2022	
TX	MESQUITE HEAT FIRE	FM-5440-TX	2022	
AZ	PIPELINE FIRE	FM-5441-AZ	2022	
AK	CLEAR FIRE	FM-5442-AK	2022	
TX	HARD CASTLE FIRE	FM-5443-TX	2022	
TX	CHALK MOUNTAIN FIRE	FM-5444-TX	2022	
CA	OAK FIRE	FM-5445-CA	2022	
OR	MILLER ROAD FIRE	FM-5446-OR	2022	
WA	LIND FIRE	FM-5447-WA	2022	
NV	JOY LAKE FIRE	FM-5448-NV	2022	
ID	FOUR CORNERS FIRE	FM-5449-ID	2022	
CA	MILL FIRE	FM-5450-CA	2022	
CA	FAIRVIEW FIRE	FM-5451-CA	2022	
ID	ROSS FORK FIRE	FM-5452-ID	2022	
CA	MOSQUITO FIRE	FM-5453-CA	2022	
OR	MILO MCIVER FIRE	FM-5454-OR	2022	
WA	BOLT CREEK FIRE	FM-5455-WA	2022	
CO	EAST TROUBLESOME FIRE	FM-5378-CO	2021	
CO	CALWOOD FIRE	FM-5379-CO	2021	
CA	SILVERADO FIRE	FM-5380-CA	2021	
CA	BLUE RIDGE FIRE	FM-5381-CA	2021	
NV	PINEHAVEN FIRE	FM-5382-NV	2021	
CA	BOND FIRE	FM-5383-CA	2021	
SD	SCHROEDER FIRE	FM-5384-SD	2021	
AZ	MARGO FIRE	FM-5385-AZ	2021	
NM	THREE RIVERS FIRE	FM-5386-NM	2021	
AZ	SPUR FIRE	FM-5387-AZ	2021	
UT	MAMMOTH FIRE	FM-5388-UT	2021	
AZ	TELEGRAPH FIRE	FM-5389-AZ	2021	
NV	JACKS VALLEY FIRE	FM-5390-NV	2021	
UT	PACK CREEK FIRE	FM-5391-UT	2021	
MT	ROBERTSON DRAW FIRE	FM-5392-MT	2021	
CA	LAVA FIRE	FM-5393-CA	2021	
OR	0419 FIRE	FM-5394-OR	2021	
WA	ANDRUS FIRE	FM-5395-WA	2021	
OR	BOOTLEG FIRE	FM-5396-OR	2021	
WA	CHUWEAH CREEK FIRE	FM-5397-WA	2021	
WA	RED APPLE FIRE	FM-5398-WA	2021	
MT	BUFFALO WILDFIRE	FM-5399-MT	2021	
CA	DIXIE FIRE	FM-5400-CA	2021	
WA	CEDAR CREEK FIRE	FM-5401-WA	2021	
NV	TAMARACK FIRE	FM-5402-NV	2021	
MT	PF FIRE	FM-5403-MT	2021	
HI	MANA ROAD FIRE	FM-5404-HI	2021	
CA	RIVER FIRE	FM-5405-CA	2021	
MT	RICHARD SPRING FIRE	FM-5406-MT	2021	
ID	BEDROCK FIRE	FM-5407-ID	2021	
UT	PARLEYS CANYON FIRE	FM-5408-UT	2021	
OR	PATTON MEADOW FIRE	FM-5409-OR	2021	
WA	MUCKAMUCK FIRE	FM-5410-WA	2021	
WA	FORD CORKSCREW FIRE	FM-5411-WA	2021	
CA	MONUMENT FIRE	FM-5412-CA	2021	
CA	CALDOR FIRE	FM-5413-CA	2021	
WA	TWENTYFIVE MILE FIRE	FM-5414-WA	2021	
WA	SCHNEIDER SPRINGS FIRE	FM-5415-WA	2021	
CA	FRENCH FIRE	FM-5416-CA	2021	
CA	FAWN FIRE	FM-5417-CA	2021	
CA	SADDLERIDGE FIRE	FM-5293-CA	2020	
HI	KAHANA RIDGE FIRE	FM-5294-HI	2020	
CA	KINCADE FIRE	FM-5295-CA	2020	
CA	TICK FIRE	FM-5296-CA	2020	
CA	GETTY FIRE	FM-5297-CA	2020	
CA	EASY FIRE	FM-5298-CA	2020	
CA	HILL FIRE	FM-5299-CA	2020	
CA	46 FIRE	FM-5300-CA	2020	
CA	HILLSIDE FIRE	FM-5301-CA	2020	
CA	MARIA FIRE	FM-5302-CA	2020	
CA	CAVE FIRE	FM-5303-CA	2020	
OK	HIGHWAY 50 FIRE	FM-5304-OK	2020	
OK	GAUGE FIRE	FM-5305-OK	2020	
OK	412 FIRE COMPLEX	FM-5306-OK	2020	
FL	5 MILE SWAMP FIRE	FM-5307-FL	2020	
FL	MUSSETT BAYOU FIRE	FM-5308-FL	2020	
FL	36TH AVENUE FIRE	FM-5309-FL	2020	
AZ	EAST DESERT FIRE	FM-5310-AZ	2020	
AZ	OCOTILLO FIRE	FM-5311-AZ	2020	
AZ	BIG HORN FIRE	FM-5312-AZ	2020	
AZ	BUSH FIRE	FM-5313-AZ	2020	
AZ	AQUILA FIRE	FM-5314-AZ	2020	
AZ	AVONDALE FIRE	FM-5315-AZ	2020	
NV	POEVILLE ROAD FIRE	FM-5316-NV	2020	
UT	CANAL FIRE	FM-5317-UT	2020	
UT	KNOLLS FIRE	FM-5318-UT	2020	
NV	NUMBERS FIRE	FM-5319-NV	2020	
WA	ROAD 11 FIRE	FM-5320-WA	2020	
UT	VEYO WEST FIRE	FM-5321-UT	2020	
NV	ROCKFARM FIRE	FM-5322-NV	2020	
WA	ANGLIN FIRE	FM-5323-WA	2020	
MT	FALLING STAR FIRE	FM-5324-MT	2020	
CA	APPLE FIRE	FM-5325-CA	2020	
NV	NORTH FIRE	FM-5326-NV	2020	
OR	MOSIER CREEK FIRE	FM-5327-OR	2020	
NV	LOYALTON FIRE	FM-5328-NV	2020	
CA	RIVER FIRE	FM-5329-CA	2020	
WA	NORTH BROWNSTOWN FIRE	FM-5330-WA	2020	
CA	LNU LIGHTNING FIRE COMPLEX	FM-5331-CA	2020	
CA	JONES FIRE	FM-5332-CA	2020	
CA	CARMEL FIRE	FM-5333-CA	2020	
CO	GRIZZLY CREEK FIRE	FM-5334-CO	2020	
CO	PINE GULCH FIRE	FM-5335-CO	2020	
CA	CZU LIGHTNING FIRE COMPLEX	FM-5336-CA	2020	
WA	PALMER FIRE	FM-5337-WA	2020	
CA	SCU LIGTNING COMPLEX FIRE	FM-5338-CA	2020	
CA	SHEEP FIRE	FM-5339-CA	2020	
AZ	GRIFFIN FIRE	FM-5340-AZ	2020	
OR	WHITE RIVER FIRE	FM-5341-OR	2020	
WA	EVANS CANYON FIRE	FM-5342-WA	2020	
MT	HUFF FIRE	FM-5343-MT	2020	
MT	BOBCAT FIRE	FM-5344-MT	2020	
MT	SNIDER/RICE FIRE COMPLEX	FM-5345-MT	2020	
MT	BRIDGER FOOTHILLS FIRE	FM-5346-MT	2020	
WY	316 FIRE	FM-5347-WY	2020	
CA	CREEK FIRE	FM-5348-CA	2020	
CO	CAMERON PEAK FIRE	FM-5349-CO	2020	
CA	EL DORADO FIRE	FM-5350-CA	2020	
WA	COLD SPRINGS/PEARL HILL FIRE	FM-5351-WA	2020	
WA	APPLE ACRES FIRE	FM-5352-WA	2020	
UT	ETHER HOLLOW FIRE	FM-5353-UT	2020	
OR	TWO FOUR TWO FIRE	FM-5354-OR	2020	
WA	BABB FIRE	FM-5355-WA	2020	
OR	BEACHIE CREEK LIONSHEAD FIRE COMPLEX	FM-5356-OR	2020	
OR	HOLIDAY FARM FIRE	FM-5357-OR	2020	
OR	POWERLINE FIRE	FM-5358-OR	2020	
WA	BORDEAUX ROAD FIRE	FM-5359-WA	2020	
WA	SUMNER GRADE FIRE	FM-5360-WA	2020	
CA	SLATER FIRE	FM-5361-CA	2020	
OR	ECHO MOUNTAIN FIRE COMPLEX	FM-5362-OR	2020	
CA	BEAR FIRE	FM-5363-CA	2020	
OR	ALMEDA GLENDOWER FIRE	FM-5364-OR	2020	
OR	ARCHIE CREEK FIRE	FM-5365-OR	2020	
OR	RIVERSIDE FIRE	FM-5366-OR	2020	
OR	SOUTH OBENCHAIN FIRE	FM-5367-OR	2020	
OR	PIKE ROAD FIRE	FM-5368-OR	2020	
OR	SLATER FIRE	FM-5369-OR	2020	
OR	CLAKAMAS COUNTY FIRE COMPLEX	FM-5370-OR	2020	
OR	CHEHALEM MOUNTAIN BALD PEAK FIRE	FM-5371-OR	2020	
OR	BRATTAIN FIRE	FM-5372-OR	2020	
CA	SQF FIRE COMPLEX	FM-5373-CA	2020	
CA	BOBCAT FIRE	FM-5374-CA	2020	
WY	MULLEN FIRE	FM-5375-WY	2020	
CA	GLASS FIRE	FM-5376-CA	2020	
CA	ZOGG FIRE	FM-5377-CA	2020	
CA	CAMP FIRE	FM-5278-CA	2019	
CA	HILL FIRE	FM-5279-CA	2019	
CA	WOOLSEY FIRE	FM-5280-CA	2019	
NM	IRONWORKS FIRE	FM-5281-NM	2019	
AK	SHOVEL CREEK FIRE	FM-5282-AK	2019	
NV	JASPER FIRE	FM-5283-NV	2019	
AZ	MUSEUM FIRE	FM-5284-AZ	2019	
OR	MILE POST 97 FIRE	FM-5285-OR	2019	
MT	NORTH HILLS FIRE	FM-5286-MT	2019	
AK	MCKINLEY FIRE	FM-5287-AK	2019	
TX	COPPER BREAKS FIRE	FM-5288-TX	2019	
NV	CANYON FIRE	FM-5289-NV	2019	
AK	DESHKA LANDING FIRE	FM-5290-AK	2019	
NV	LONG VALLEY FIRE	FM-5291-NV	2019	
UT	GUN RANGE FIRE	FM-5292-UT	2019	
CA	ATLAS FIRE	FM-5214-CA	2018	
CA	TUBBS FIRE	FM-5215-CA	2018	
CA	CASCADE FIRE	FM-5216-CA	2018	
CA	LOBO FIRE	FM-5217-CA	2018	
CA	LA PORTE FIRE	FM-5218-CA	2018	
CA	REDWOOD VALLEY FIRE	FM-5219-CA	2018	
CA	NUNS FIRE	FM-5220-CA	2018	
CA	SULPHUR FIRE	FM-5221-CA	2018	
CA	PARTRICK FIRE	FM-5222-CA	2018	
CA	CANYON 2 FIRE	FM-5223-CA	2018	
CA	THOMAS FIRE	FM-5224-CA	2018	
CA	CREEK FIRE	FM-5225-CA	2018	
CA	RYE FIRE	FM-5226-CA	2018	
CA	SKIRBALL FIRE	FM-5227-CA	2018	
CA	LILAC FIRE	FM-5228-CA	2018	
SD	LEGION LAKE FIRE	FM-5229-SD	2018	
OK	SHUMACH FIRE COMPLEX	FM-5230-OK	2018	
OK	34 FIRE COMPLEX	FM-5231-OK	2018	
OK	RHEA FIRE COMPLEX	FM-5232-OK	2018	
TX	HARBOR BAY FIRE	FM-5233-TX	2018	
TX	335 FIRE	FM-5234-TX	2018	
TX	MCCLELLAN FIRE	FM-5235-TX	2018	
AZ	TINDER FIRE	FM-5236-AZ	2018	
TX	MCDANNALD FIRE	FM-5237-TX	2018	
AZ	89 EAST FIRE	FM-5238-AZ	2018	
NM	UTE PARK FIRE	FM-5239-NM	2018	
NM	SOLDIER CANYON FIRE	FM-5240-NM	2018	
WY	BADGER CREEK FIRE	FM-5241-WY	2018	
NV	UPPER COLONY FIRE	FM-5242-NV	2018	
OR	GRAHAM FIRE	FM-5243-OR	2018	
CA	PAWNEE FIRE	FM-5244-CA	2018	
CA	CREEK FIRE	FM-5245-CA	2018	
CO	SPRING CREEK FIRE	FM-5246-CO	2018	
CO	CHATEAU FIRE	FM-5247-CO	2018	
UT	DOLLAR RIDGE FIRE	FM-5248-UT	2018	
CO	LAKE CHRISTINE FIRE	FM-5249-CO	2018	
CA	KLAMATHON FIRE	FM-5250-CA	2018	
CA	WEST FIRE	FM-5251-CA	2018	
CA	HOLIDAY FIRE	FM-5252-CA	2018	
WA	RYEGRASS COULEE FIRE	FM-5253-WA	2018	
WA	UPRIVER BEACON FIRE	FM-5254-WA	2018	
OR	SUBSTATION FIRE	FM-5255-OR	2018	
OR	GARNER FIRE COMPLEX	FM-5256-OR	2018	
WA	BUCKSHOT FIRE	FM-5257-WA	2018	
TX	259 FIRE	FM-5258-TX	2018	
CA	CARR FIRE	FM-5259-CA	2018	
CA	CRANSTON FIRE	FM-5260-CA	2018	
WA	CHELAN HILLS FIRE	FM-5261-WA	2018	
CA	MENDOCINO FIRE COMPLEX	FM-5262-CA	2018	
ID	GRASSY RIDGE FIRE	FM-5263-ID	2018	
TX	PARK ROAD FIRE	FM-5264-TX	2018	
OR	SOUTH VALLEY FIRE	FM-5265-OR	2018	
WA	ANGEL SPRINGS FIRE	FM-5266-WA	2018	
UT	HILLTOP FIRE	FM-5267-UT	2018	
CA	HOLY FIRE	FM-5268-CA	2018	
WA	HAWK FIRE	FM-5269-WA	2018	
WA	COUGAR CREEK FIRE	FM-5270-WA	2018	
WA	GRASS VALLEY FIRE	FM-5271-WA	2018	
SD	VINEYARD FIRE	FM-5272-SD	2018	
WA	BOYD'S FIRE	FM-5273-WA	2018	
OR	RAMSEY CANYON FIRE	FM-5274-OR	2018	
OR	HUGO ROAD FIRE	FM-5275-OR	2018	
WY	ROOSEVELT FIRE	FM-5276-WY	2018	
UT	BALD MOUNTAIN FIRE	FM-5277-UT	2018	
NV	FRONTAGE FIRE	FM-5154-NV	2017	
CO	BEULAH HILL FIRE	FM-5155-CO	2017	
NV	LITTLE VALLEY FIRE	FM-5156-NV	2017	
CO	JUNKINS FIRE	FM-5157-CO	2017	
KY	EAGLES NEST FIRE	FM-5158-KY	2017	
TN	FLIPPERS BEND FIRE	FM-5159-TN	2017	
TN	SMITH MOUNTAIN FIRE COMPLEX	FM-5160-TN	2017	
NC	PARTY ROCK FIRE	FM-5161-NC	2017	
SC	PINNACLE MOUNTAIN FIRE	FM-5162-SC	2017	
GA	TATUM GULF FIRE	FM-5163-GA	2017	
NC	CHESTNUT KNOB FIRE	FM-5164-NC	2017	
TN	EAST MILLER COVE FIRE	FM-5165-TN	2017	
KY	SOUTHEASTERN KENTUCKY FIRE COMPLEX	FM-5166-KY	2017	
TN	CHIMNEY TOP FIRE	FM-5167-TN	2017	
OK	OKC FIRE COMPLEX	FM-5168-OK	2017	
OK	141ST FIRE	FM-5169-OK	2017	
KS	HIGHLAND HILLS FIRE	FM-5170-KS	2017	
KS	CLARK COUNTY FIRE	FM-5171-KS	2017	
KS	ELLSWORTH-LINCOLN-RUSSELL FIRE COMPLEX	FM-5172-KS	2017	
KS	FORD COUNTY FIRE COMPLEX	FM-5173-KS	2017	
KS	NESS COUNTY FIRE	FM-5174-KS	2017	
KS	ROOKS COUNTY FIRE	FM-5175-KS	2017	
KS	COMANCHE COUNTY FIRE	FM-5176-KS	2017	
OK	NW OKLAHOMA WILDFIRE OUTBREAK COMPLEX	FM-5177-OK	2017	
FL	30TH AVENUE FIRE	FM-5178-FL	2017	
FL	LEHIGH ACRES (ANNA AVE. N.) FIRE	FM-5179-FL	2017	
FL	INDIAN LAKE ESTATES FIRE	FM-5180-FL	2017	
GA	WEST MIMS FIRE	FM-5181-GA	2017	
WA	SPROMBERG FIRE	FM-5182-WA	2017	
AZ	LIZARD FIRE	FM-5183-AZ	2017	
NM	EL CAJETE FIRE	FM-5184-NM	2017	
UT	BRIAN HEAD FIRE	FM-5185-UT	2017	
AZ	GOODWIN FIRE	FM-5186-AZ	2017	
WA	SOUTH WENAS FIRE	FM-5187-WA	2017	
AZ	ROACH FIRE	FM-5188-AZ	2017	
CA	WALL FIRE	FM-5189-CA	2017	
NV	COLD SPRINGS FIRE	FM-5190-NV	2017	
NV	OIL WELL FIRE	FM-5191-NV	2017	
CA	DETWILER FIRE	FM-5192-CA	2017	
NV	PREACHER FIRE	FM-5193-NV	2017	
MT	LODGEPOLE FIRE COMPLEX	FM-5194-MT	2017	
OR	PIPELINE FIRE	FM-5195-OR	2017	
OR	MILLI 0843 CS FIRE	FM-5196-OR	2017	
MT	LOLO PEAK FIRE	FM-5197-MT	2017	
OR	CHETCO BAR FIRE	FM-5198-OR	2017	
CA	HELENA FIRE	FM-5199-CA	2017	
WA	JOLLY MOUNTAIN FIRE	FM-5200-WA	2017	
CA	LA TUNA FIRE	FM-5201-CA	2017	
CA	RAILROAD FIRE	FM-5202-CA	2017	
OR	EAGLE CREEK FIRE	FM-5203-OR	2017	
CA	MISSION FIRE	FM-5204-CA	2017	
CA	PIER FIRE	FM-5205-CA	2017	
UT	UINTAH FIRE	FM-5206-UT	2017	
MT	RICE RIDGE FIRE	FM-5207-MT	2017	
MT	ALICE CREEK FIRE	FM-5208-MT	2017	
MT	WEST FORK FIRE	FM-5209-MT	2017	
MT	HIGHWAY 200 FIRE COMPLEX	FM-5210-MT	2017	
MT	MOOSE PEAK FIRE	FM-5211-MT	2017	
MT	STRAWBERRY FIRE	FM-5212-MT	2017	
CA	CANYON FIRE	FM-5213-CA	2017	
WY	STATION FIRE	FM-5115-WY	2016	
TX	HIDDEN PINES FIRE	FM-5116-TX	2016	
OK	DLD FIRE COMPLEX	FM-5117-OK	2016	
OK	OAK GROVE FIRE	FM-5118-OK	2016	
OK	PAWNEE COVE FIRE	FM-5119-OK	2016	
KS	ANDERSON CREEK FIRE	FM-5120-KS	2016	
KS	BURR OAK FIRE	FM-5121-KS	2016	
OK	350 FIRE COMPLEX	FM-5122-OK	2016	
NH	STODDARD FIRE	FM-5123-NH	2016	
CA	OLD FIRE	FM-5124-CA	2016	
AZ	TENDERFOOT FIRE	FM-5125-AZ	2016	
OR	AKAWANA FIRE	FM-5126-OR	2016	
NM	DOG HEAD FIRE	FM-5127-NM	2016	
CA	BORDER 3 FIRE	FM-5128-CA	2016	
CA	FISH FIRE	FM-5129-CA	2016	
UT	SADDLE FIRE	FM-5130-UT	2016	
CA	ERSKINE FIRE	FM-5131-CA	2016	
CA	SAGE FIRE	FM-5132-CA	2016	
CO	COLD SPRINGS FIRE	FM-5133-CO	2016	
NM	TIMBERON FIRE	FM-5134-NM	2016	
CA	SAND FIRE	FM-5135-CA	2016	
WY	LAVA MOUNTAIN FIRE	FM-5136-WY	2016	
CA	SOBERANES FIRE	FM-5137-CA	2016	
NV	ROCK FIRE	FM-5138-NV	2016	
WY	TOKAWANA FIRE	FM-5139-WY	2016	
CA	GOOSE FIRE	FM-5140-CA	2016	
NV	VIRGINIA MOUNTAINS COMPLEX FIRE	FM-5141-NV	2016	
WA	SOUTH WARD GAP FIRE	FM-5142-WA	2016	
MT	ROARING LION FIRE	FM-5143-MT	2016	
CA	PILOT FIRE	FM-5144-CA	2016	
CA	CLAYTON FIRE	FM-5145-CA	2016	
CA	CHIMNEY FIRE	FM-5146-CA	2016	
CA	BLUE CUT FIRE	FM-5147-CA	2016	
WA	WELLESLEY FIRE	FM-5148-WA	2016	
WA	YALE FIRE	FM-5149-WA	2016	
CA	CEDAR FIRE	FM-5150-CA	2016	
ID	HENRYS CREEK FIRE	FM-5151-ID	2016	
WA	SUNCREST FIRE	FM-5152-WA	2016	
OR	GOLD CANYON FIRE	FM-5153-OR	2016	
CA	APPLEGATE FIRE	FM-5082-CA	2015	
AZ	SLIDE FIRE	FM-5083-AZ	2015	
AK	SOCKEYE FIRE	FM-5084-AK	2015	
AK	CARD STREET FIRE	FM-5085-AK	2015	
AZ	KEARNY RIVER FIRE	FM-5086-AZ	2015	
WA	SLEEPY HOLLOW FIRE	FM-5087-WA	2015	
ID	CAPE HORN FIRE	FM-5088-ID	2015	
CA	NORTH FIRE	FM-5089-CA	2015	
WA	BLUE CREEK FIRE	FM-5090-WA	2015	
CA	WRAGG FIRE	FM-5091-CA	2015	
OR	STOUTS CREEK FIRE	FM-5092-OR	2015	
CA	ROCKY FIRE	FM-5093-CA	2015	
WA	HIGHWAY 8 FIRE	FM-5094-WA	2015	
AZ	WILLOW FIRE	FM-5095-AZ	2015	
OR	KRAUSS LANE FIRE	FM-5096-OR	2015	
OR	CORNET AND WINDY RIDGE FIRE COMPLEX	FM-5097-OR	2015	
WA	NINE MILE FIRE	FM-5098-WA	2015	
ID	CLEARWATER LAWYER BRANCH FIRE COMPLEX	FM-5099-ID	2015	
WA	CHELAN FIRE COMPLEX	FM-5100-WA	2015	
WA	STICKPIN FIRE	FM-5101-WA	2015	
OR	CANYON CREEK FIRE COMPLEX	FM-5102-OR	2015	
WA	STEVENS COUNTY FIRE COMPLEX	FM-5103-WA	2015	
WA	OKANAGAN COUNTY FIRE COMPLEX	FM-5104-WA	2015	
ID	MUNICIPAL FIRE	FM-5105-ID	2015	
WA	TWISP RIVER FIRE	FM-5106-WA	2015	
OR	GRIZZLY BEAR FIRE COMPLEX	FM-5107-OR	2015	
WA	RENNER FIRE	FM-5108-WA	2015	
WA	GOODELL FIRE	FM-5109-WA	2015	
ID	TEPEE SPRINGS FIRE	FM-5110-ID	2015	
CA	BUTTE FIRE	FM-5111-CA	2015	
CA	VALLEY FIRE	FM-5112-CA	2015	
WA	HORSETHIEF BUTTE FIRE	FM-5113-WA	2015	
OR	DRY GULCH FIRE	FM-5114-OR	2015	

=== 2005 - 2015 ===
State	Name	FEMA disaster code	Year declared	Notes
CA	COLBY FIRE	FM-5051-CA	2014	
OK	GUTHRIE FIRE	FM-5052-OK	2014	
TX	DOUBLE DIAMOND FIRE	FM-5053-TX	2014	
CA	POINSETTIA FIRE	FM-5054-CA	2014	
CA	COCOS FIRE	FM-5055-CA	2014	
OR	TWO BULLS FIRE	FM-5056-OR	2014	
CA	BUTTS FIRE	FM-5057-CA	2014	
WA	LAKE SPOKANE FIRE	FM-5058-WA	2014	
WA	MILLS CANYON FIRE	FM-5059-WA	2014	
OR	MOCCASIN HILLS FIRE	FM-5060-OR	2014	
WA	CHIWAUKUM FIRE	FM-5061-WA	2014	
WA	CARLTON COMPLEX FIRE	FM-5062-WA	2014	
WA	WATERMELON HILL FIRE	FM-5063-WA	2014	
WA	SADDLE MOUNTAIN FIRE	FM-5064-WA	2014	
UT	ANACONDA FIRE	FM-5065-UT	2014	
OR	OREGON GULCH FIRE	FM-5066-OR	2014	
CA	EILER FIRE	FM-5067-CA	2014	
CA	OREGON GULCH FIRE	FM-5068-CA	2014	
CA	BALD FIRE	FM-5069-CA	2014	
CA	DAY FIRE	FM-5070-CA	2014	
WA	SNAG CANYON FIRE	FM-5071-WA	2014	
WA	HANSEL FIRE	FM-5072-WA	2014	
OR	ROWENA FIRE	FM-5073-OR	2014	
CA	JUNCTION FIRE	FM-5074-CA	2014	
CA	WAY FIRE	FM-5075-CA	2014	
CA	OREGON FIRE	FM-5076-CA	2014	
CA	BRIDGE FIRE	FM-5077-CA	2014	
CA	COURTNEY FIRE	FM-5078-CA	2014	
CA	BOLES FIRE	FM-5079-CA	2014	
OR	36 PIT FIRE	FM-5080-OR	2014	
CA	KING FIRE	FM-5081-CA	2014	
CO	WETMORE FIRE	FM-5022-CO	2013	
CA	SUMMIT FIRE	FM-5023-CA	2013	
CA	SPRINGS FIRE	FM-5024-CA	2013	
CA	POWERHOUSE FIRE	FM-5025-CA	2013	
NM	TRES LAGUNAS FIRE	FM-5026-NM	2013	
CO	BLACK FOREST FIRE	FM-5027-CO	2013	
CO	ROYAL GORGE FIRE	FM-5028-CO	2013	
AZ	DOCE FIRE	FM-5029-AZ	2013	
CO	EAST PEAK FIRE	FM-5030-CO	2013	
CO	WEST FORK FIRE COMPLEX	FM-5031-CO	2013	
AZ	YARNELL HILL FIRE	FM-5032-AZ	2013	
AZ	DEAN PEAK FIRE	FM-5033-AZ	2013	
NV	CARPENTER 1 FIRE	FM-5034-NV	2013	
MT	WEST MULLAN FIRE	FM-5035-MT	2013	
OR	PACIFICA FIRE	FM-5036-OR	2013	
OR	DOUGLAS FIRE COMPLEX	FM-5037-OR	2013	
WA	COLOCKUM TARPS FIRE	FM-5038-WA	2013	
OR	BRIMSTONE FIRE	FM-5039-OR	2013	
CA	FALLS FIRE	FM-5040-CA	2013	
CA	SILVER FIRE	FM-5041-CA	2013	
WA	MILE POST 10 FIRE	FM-5042-WA	2013	
ID	ELK FIRE	FM-5043-ID	2013	
UT	ROCKPORT FIVE FIRE	FM-5044-UT	2013	
ID	BEAVER CREEK FIRE	FM-5045-ID	2013	
OR	GOVERNMENT FLATS FIRE COMPLEX	FM-5046-OR	2013	
MT	LOLO CREEK FIRE COMPLEX	FM-5047-MT	2013	
WA	EAGLE FIRE	FM-5048-WA	2013	
CA	RIM FIRE	FM-5049-CA	2013	
CA	CLOVER FIRE	FM-5050-CA	2013	
NV	INDIAN CREEK FIRE	FM-2972-NV	2012	
NV	CAUGHLIN FIRE	FM-2973-NV	2012	
NV	WASHOE FIRE	FM-2974-NV	2012	
CO	LOWER NORTH FORK FIRE	FM-2975-CO	2012	
TX	LIVERMORE RANCH FIRE COMPLEX	FM-2976-TX	2012	
NV	TRE FIRE	FM-2977-NV	2012	
NM	WHITEWATER-BALDY FIRE COMPLEX	FM-2978-NM	2012	
NM	LITTLE BEAR FIRE	FM-2979-NM	2012	
CO	HIGH PARK FIRE	FM-2980-CO	2012	
NM	BLANCO (CR 4901) FIRE	FM-2981-NM	2012	
NM	ROMERO FIRE	FM-2982-NM	2012	
UT	DUMP FIRE	FM-2983-UT	2012	
CO	WALDO CANYON FIRE	FM-2984-CO	2012	
CO	WEBER FIRE	FM-2985-CO	2012	
UT	WOOD HOLLOW FIRE	FM-2986-UT	2012	
MT	CORRAL FIRE	FM-2987-MT	2012	
MT	DAHL FIRE	FM-2988-MT	2012	
MT	ASH CREEK FIRE	FM-2989-MT	2012	
UT	CLAY SPRINGS FIRE	FM-2990-UT	2012	
UT	ROSE CREST FIRE	FM-2991-UT	2012	
WY	ARAPAHOE FIRE	FM-2992-WY	2012	
WY	SQUIRREL CREEK FIRE	FM-2993-WY	2012	
UT	SHINGLE FIRE	FM-2994-UT	2012	
WY	OIL CREEK FIRE	FM-2995-WY	2012	
SD	MYRTLE FIRE	FM-2996-SD	2012	
OK	FAIR GROUNDS FIRE COMPLEX	FM-2997-OK	2012	
OK	GEARY FIRE	FM-2998-OK	2012	
OK	NOBLE FIRE	FM-2999-OK	2012	
OK	FREEDOM FIRE	FM-5000-OK	2012	
OK	LUTHER FIRE	FM-5001-OK	2012	
OK	GLENCOE FIRE	FM-5002-OK	2012	
OK	DRUMRIGHT FIRE	FM-5003-OK	2012	
CA	WYE FIRE	FM-5004-CA	2012	
WA	TAYLOR BRIDGE FIRE	FM-5005-WA	2012	
ID	TRINITY RIDGE FIRE	FM-5006-ID	2012	
CA	PONDEROSA FIRE	FM-5007-CA	2012	
MT	NINETEEN MILE FIRE	FM-5008-MT	2012	
NE	REGION 23 FIRE COMPLEX	FM-5009-NE	2012	
SD	WELLNITZ FIRE	FM-5010-SD	2012	
WA	HIGHWAY 141 FIRE COMPLEX	FM-5011-WA	2012	
WA	1ST CANYON FIRE	FM-5012-WA	2012	
WA	BARKER CANYON FIRE	FM-5013-WA	2012	
WY	SHEEP HERDER HILL FIRE COMPLEX	FM-5014-WY	2012	
WA	BYRD CANYON FIRE	FM-5015-WA	2012	
MT	SAWTOOTH FIRE	FM-5016-MT	2012	
WA	POISON FIRE	FM-5017-WA	2012	
WA	PEAVINE FIRE	FM-5018-WA	2012	
ID	KARNEY FIRE	FM-5019-ID	2012	
WA	TABLE MOUNTAIN FIRE	FM-5020-WA	2012	
CA	SHOCKEY FIRE	FM-5021-CA	2012	
VA	SMITH FIRE	FM-2860-VA	2011	
VA	COFFMAN FIRE	FM-2861-VA	2011	
TX	WILLOW CREEK SOUTH FIRE COMPLEX	FM-2862-TX	2011	
TX	MATADOR FIRE	FM-2863-TX	2011	
TX	TANGLEWOOD FIRE COMPLEX	FM-2864-TX	2011	
TX	MITCHELL FIRE COMPLEX	FM-2865-TX	2011	
NM	QUAIL RIDGE FIRE	FM-2866-NM	2011	
TX	ENMIN FIRE	FM-2867-TX	2011	
OK	HARRAH FIRE	FM-2868-OK	2011	
OK	MIDWEST CITY FIRE COMPLEX	FM-2869-OK	2011	
TX	BIG TRICKLE RANCH FIRE	FM-2870-TX	2011	
OK	GOLDSBY FIRE	FM-2871-OK	2011	
OK	SHAWNEE FIRE	FM-2872-OK	2011	
CO	INDIAN GULCH FIRE	FM-2873-CO	2011	
OK	OSAGE COUNTY FIRE COMPLEX	FM-2874-OK	2011	
GA	ELAN CHURCH ROAD FIRE	FM-2875-GA	2011	
GA	MOSLEY ROAD FIRE	FM-2876-GA	2011	
CO	CRYSTAL FIRE	FM-2877-CO	2011	
KS	HASKELL COUNTY FIRE	FM-2878-KS	2011	
OK	GUYMON FIRE	FM-2879-OK	2011	
NM	WHITE FIRE	FM-2880-NM	2011	
TX	BATES FIELD FIRE	FM-2881-TX	2011	
TX	EL CENIZO FIRE	FM-2882-TX	2011	
OK	JONES SPENCER FIRE	FM-2883-OK	2011	
TX	SWENSON FIRE	FM-2884-TX	2011	
TX	ROCKHOUSE FIRE	FM-2885-TX	2011	
TX	HICKMAN FIRE	FM-2886-TX	2011	
OK	CLEVELAND FIRE	FM-2887-OK	2011	
TX	PK WEST FIRE	FM-2888-TX	2011	
TX	COOPER MOUNTAIN RANCH FIRE	FM-2889-TX	2011	
OK	GOODYEAR PLANT FIRE	FM-2890-OK	2011	
TX	WICHITA FIRE COMPLEX	FM-2891-TX	2011	
TX	WILDCAT FIRE	FM-2892-TX	2011	
TX	HOHERTZ FIRE	FM-2893-TX	2011	
TX	EAST SIDWYNICKS FIRE	FM-2894-TX	2011	
TX	PK EAST FIRE	FM-2895-TX	2011	
TX	BRYSON FIRE COMPLEX	FM-2896-TX	2011	
NM	TIRE FIRE	FM-2897-NM	2011	
TX	PINNACLE FIRE	FM-2898-TX	2011	
TX	148/2332 FIRE	FM-2899-TX	2011	
NE	THEDFORD FIRE	FM-2900-NE	2011	
TX	PLEASANT FARMS FIRE	FM-2901-TX	2011	
FL	SLOPE FIRE	FM-2902-FL	2011	
TX	OASIS PIPELINE FIRE	FM-2903-TX	2011	
TX	WAGGONER RANCH FIRE	FM-2904-TX	2011	
TX	SISK ROAD FIRE	FM-2905-TX	2011	
TX	GAGE HOLLAND FIRE	FM-2906-TX	2011	
AZ	HORSESHOE TWO FIRE	FM-2907-AZ	2011	
TX	MATT LOOP FIRE	FM-2908-TX	2011	
AK	MOOSE MOUNTAIN FIRE	FM-2909-AK	2011	
TX	CEED FIRE	FM-2910-TX	2011	
TX	REIMER FIRE	FM-2911-TX	2011	
TX	PITT ROAD FIRE	FM-2912-TX	2011	
TX	STONE RIDGE FIRE	FM-2913-TX	2011	
TX	TEJANO CANYON FIRE	FM-2914-TX	2011	
AZ	WALLOW FIRE	FM-2915-AZ	2011	
TX	SNYDER FIRE	FM-2916-TX	2011	
NM	WALLOW FIRE	FM-2917-NM	2011	
NM	TRACK FIRE	FM-2918-NM	2011	
AZ	MONUMENT FIRE	FM-2919-AZ	2011	
GA	RACEPOND WILDFIRE	FM-2920-GA	2011	
GA	SWEAT FARM AGAIN FIRE	FM-2921-GA	2011	
TX	GRAND MESA FIRE	FM-2922-TX	2011	
CO	DUCKETT FIRE	FM-2923-CO	2011	
TX	FOREST BROOK FIRE	FM-2924-TX	2011	
TX	COUNTY LINE FIRE	FM-2925-TX	2011	
TX	POWERLINE FIRE	FM-2926-TX	2011	
TX	DYER MILL FIRE	FM-2927-TX	2011	
TX	MCDONALD 2 FIRE	FM-2928-TX	2011	
TX	COWBOY CHURCH FIRE	FM-2929-TX	2011	
TX	BOYKEN ROAD FIRE	FM-2930-TX	2011	
TX	WHITE HAT FIRE	FM-2931-TX	2011	
OK	MEDICINE PARK FIRE	FM-2932-OK	2011	
NM	LAS CONCHAS FIRE	FM-2933-NM	2011	
NM	LITTLE LEWIS FIRE	FM-2934-NM	2011	
NM	DONALDSON FIRE	FM-2935-NM	2011	
NC	SIMMONS ROAD FIRE	FM-2936-NC	2011	
TX	NOLAN COUNTY FIRE COMPLEX	FM-2937-TX	2011	
OK	EDMOND FIRE	FM-2938-OK	2011	
OK	FALLS CREEK FIRE	FM-2939-OK	2011	
OK	FRANKHOMA 81-FIRE	FM-2940-OK	2011	
OK	MUSTANG ROAD FIRE	FM-2941-OK	2011	
OK	ANDERSON ROAD FIRE	FM-2942-OK	2011	
OK	REGENCY FIRE	FM-2943-OK	2011	
OK	TURLEY FIRE	FM-2944-OK	2011	
OK	COFFEE CREEK FIRE	FM-2945-OK	2011	
OK	265TH WEST FIRE	FM-2946-OK	2011	
OK	CLEVELAND-MANNFORD FIRE COMPLEX	FM-2947-OK	2011	
OK	CEDAR LANE FIRE	FM-2948-OK	2011	
TX	HORSESHOE FIRE	FM-2949-TX	2011	
MT	CANYON CREEK FIRE	FM-2950-MT	2011	
OK	63RD AND SOONER ROAD FIRE	FM-2951-OK	2011	
TX	101 RANCH FIRE	FM-2952-TX	2011	
OK	TWIN LAKES FIRE COMPLEX	FM-2953-OK	2011	
OK	WESTMINSTER FIRE	FM-2954-OK	2011	
CA	HILL FIRE	FM-2955-CA	2011	
OK	FERGUSON FIRE	FM-2956-OK	2011	
TX	HODDE FIRE	FM-2957-TX	2011	
TX	BASTROP COUNTY FIRE COMPLEX	FM-2958-TX	2011	
TX	PEDERNALES BEND FIRE	FM-2959-TX	2011	
TX	STEINER RANCH FIRE	FM-2960-TX	2011	
CA	CANYON FIRE	FM-2961-CA	2011	
TX	TAMINA FIRE	FM-2962-TX	2011	
TX	MOONGLOW FIRE	FM-2963-TX	2011	
TX	RILEY ROAD FIRE	FM-2964-TX	2011	
TX	BEAR CREEK FIRE	FM-2965-TX	2011	
WA	MONASTERY FIRE COMPLEX	FM-2966-WA	2011	
TX	BIG OAK FIRE	FM-2967-TX	2011	
TX	PAT GROSS FIRE	FM-2968-TX	2011	
NV	HOLBROOK FIRE	FM-2969-NV	2011	
CA	KEENE FIRE COMPLEX	FM-2970-CA	2011	
CA	COMANCHE FIRE COMPLEX	FM-2971-CA	2011	
AZ	TWIN FIRE	FM-2840-AZ	2010	
CA	SHEEP FIRE	FM-2841-CA	2010	
NM	CABAZON FIRE	FM-2842-NM	2010	
NM	RIO FIRE	FM-2843-NM	2010	
HI	MAALAEA FIRE	FM-2844-HI	2010	
AZ	HARDY FIRE	FM-2845-AZ	2010	
AZ	SHULTZ FIRE	FM-2846-AZ	2010	
NV	CATHEDRAL FIRE	FM-2847-NV	2010	
WA	COWICHE MILLS FIRE	FM-2848-WA	2010	
CA	BULL FIRE	FM-2849-CA	2010	
CA	WEST FIRE	FM-2850-CA	2010	
CA	CROWN FIRE	FM-2851-CA	2010	
CA	POST FIRE	FM-2852-CA	2010	
ID	HURD FIRE	FM-2853-ID	2010	
WA	SLIDE CREEK WILDFIRE	FM-2854-WA	2010	
CO	FOUR MILE CANYON FIRE	FM-2855-CO	2010	
CA	GLENVIEW FIRE	FM-2856-CA	2010	
CO	RESERVOIR ROAD FIRE	FM-2857-CO	2010	
CA	CANYON FIRE	FM-2858-CA	2010	
UT	MACHINE GUN FIRE	FM-2859-UT	2010	
CA	MAREK FIRE	FM-2788-CA	2009	
CA	SESNON FIRE	FM-2789-CA	2009	
CA	TEA FIRE	FM-2790-CA	2009	
CA	SAYRE FIRE	FM-2791-CA	2009	
CA	FREEWAY FIRE COMPLEX	FM-2792-CA	2009	
CO	OLDE STAGE FIRE	FM-2793-CO	2009	
TX	CLYDE FIRE	FM-2794-TX	2009	
TX	RHODES RANCH FIRE	FM-2795-TX	2009	
TX	WILDERNESS RIDGE FIRE	FM-2796-TX	2009	
TX	LOMA DEL NORTE FIRE	FM-2797-TX	2009	
TX	TUSCOLA FIRE	FM-2798-TX	2009	
OK	TALOGA FIRE	FM-2799-OK	2009	
TX	GREENWOOD FIRE	FM-2800-TX	2009	
TX	LAGARTO FIRE	FM-2801-TX	2009	
TX	MAGIC CITY FIRE	FM-2802-TX	2009	
TX	HOLIDAY BEACH FIRE	FM-2803-TX	2009	
TX	STEEL FIRE	FM-2804-TX	2009	
TX	ELECTRA WEST FIRE	FM-2805-TX	2009	
TX	MONTAGUE FIRE COMPLEX	FM-2806-TX	2009	
TX	CEMENT MOUNTAIN FIRE	FM-2807-TX	2009	
OK	MIDWEST CHOCTAW FIRE	FM-2808-OK	2009	
OK	MCCLAIN COUNTY FIRE	FM-2809-OK	2009	
TX	BRECKENRIDGE FIRE	FM-2810-TX	2009	
OK	HEALDTON CARTER FIRE	FM-2811-OK	2009	
OK	VELMA FIRE	FM-2812-OK	2009	
OK	MULHALL FIRE	FM-2813-OK	2009	
TX	1148 FIRE	FM-2814-TX	2009	
TX	617 FIRE	FM-2815-TX	2009	
SC	HIGHWAY 31 FIRE	FM-2816-SC	2009	
CA	JESUSITA FIRE	FM-2817-CA	2009	
NM	BUCKWOOD FIRE	FM-2818-NM	2009	
FL	MARTIN COUNTY FIRE COMPLEX	FM-2819-FL	2009	
AK	MILE 17 EAST END ROAD FIRE	FM-2820-AK	2009	
AZ	MULE PASS FIRE	FM-2821-AZ	2009	
NV	RED ROCK FIRE	FM-2822-NV	2009	
WA	UNION VALLEY FIRE	FM-2823-WA	2009	
CA	LOCKHEED FIRE	FM-2824-CA	2009	
CA	YUBA FIRE	FM-2825-CA	2009	
WA	ODEN ROAD FIRE	FM-2826-WA	2009	
WA	DRY CREEK FIRE COMPLEX	FM-2827-WA	2009	
CA	PV FIRE	FM-2828-CA	2009	
OR	MICROWAVE FIRE	FM-2829-OR	2009	
CA	STATION FIRE	FM-2830-CA	2009	
UT	MILL FLAT FIRE	FM-2831-UT	2009	
CA	49 FIRE	FM-2832-CA	2009	
CA	OAK GLEN FIRE	FM-2833-CA	2009	
HI	KAUNAKAKAI FIRE	FM-2834-HI	2009	
AZ	WATER WHEEL FIRE	FM-2835-AZ	2009	
CA	PENDLETON FIRE	FM-2836-CA	2009	
MT	EAGLE MOUNT FIRE	FM-2837-MT	2009	
OR	SOUTH COUNTY FIRE COMPLEX	FM-2838-OR	2009	
CA	GUIBERSON FIRE	FM-2839-CA	2009	
CA	CANYON FIRE	FM-2732-CA	2008	
CA	BUCKWEED FIRE	FM-2733-CA	2008	
CA	WITCH FIRE	FM-2734-CA	2008	
CA	HARRIS FIRE	FM-2735-CA	2008	
CA	RANCH FIRE	FM-2736-CA	2008	
CA	SANTIAGO FIRE	FM-2737-CA	2008	
CA	GRASS VALLEY FIRE	FM-2738-CA	2008	
CA	RICE FIRE	FM-2739-CA	2008	
HI	PUAKO FIRE	FM-2740-HI	2008	
NM	OJO PEAK FIRE	FM-2741-NM	2008	
TX	CHEVRON FIRE	FM-2742-TX	2008	
TX	BROADWAY FIRE	FM-2743-TX	2008	
TX	SCURRY FIRE COMPLEX	FM-2744-TX	2008	
TX	SOUTH ODESSA FIRE	FM-2745-TX	2008	
OK	SOUTH WOODWARD FIRE	FM-2746-OK	2008	
TX	SILVER FIRE	FM-2747-TX	2008	
TX	NEW ARCHER FIRE	FM-2748-TX	2008	
TX	LA PERLA FIRE	FM-2749-TX	2008	
TX	ARABELLA FIRE	FM-2750-TX	2008	
TX	OLD BASTROP HIGHWAY FIRE COMPLEX	FM-2751-TX	2008	
TX	EIGHTY-TWO FIRE	FM-2752-TX	2008	
TX	322 FIRE	FM-2753-TX	2008	
TX	BURNS RANCH FIRE	FM-2754-TX	2008	
TX	ENCINO FIRE	FM-2755-TX	2008	
OK	QUINLAN FIRE	FM-2756-OK	2008	
TX	SILVER HEELS FIRE	FM-2757-TX	2008	
TX	KENTWOOD FIRE	FM-2758-TX	2008	
TX	PARKER FIRE	FM-2759-TX	2008	
CO	ORDWAY FIRE	FM-2760-CO	2008	
TX	HEBBRONVILLE FIRE	FM-2761-TX	2008	
NM	TRIGO FIRE	FM-2762-NM	2008	
CA	SANTA ANITA FIRE	FM-2763-CA	2008	
TX	PRICE FIRE	FM-2764-TX	2008	
FL	BREVARD FIRE COMPLEX	FM-2765-FL	2008	
CA	SUMMIT FIRE	FM-2766-CA	2008	
TX	REIN STREET FIRE	FM-2767-TX	2008	
TX	HUGHES RANCH FIRE	FM-2768-TX	2008	
OK	GOTEBO FIRE	FM-2769-OK	2008	
CA	OPHIR FIRE	FM-2770-CA	2008	
CA	HUMBOLDT FIRE	FM-2771-CA	2008	
CA	MARTIN FIRE	FM-2772-CA	2008	
NC	EVANS ROAD FIRE	FM-2773-NC	2008	
TX	CAMP BOWIE FIRE	FM-2774-TX	2008	
CA	TRABING FIRE	FM-2775-CA	2008	
CA	WILD FIRE	FM-2776-CA	2008	
NM	BIG SPRINGS FIRE	FM-2777-NM	2008	
CO	NASH RANCH FIRE	FM-2778-CO	2008	
AZ	LANE 2 FIRE	FM-2779-AZ	2008	
CA	GAP FIRE	FM-2780-CA	2008	
CA	BASIN FIRE COMPLEX	FM-2781-CA	2008	
CA	CAMP FIRE	FM-2782-CA	2008	
WA	SPOKANE VALLEY FIRE	FM-2783-WA	2008	
WA	BADGER MOUNTAIN FIRE COMPLEX	FM-2784-WA	2008	
TX	FLORENCE FIRE	FM-2785-TX	2008	
CA	GLADDING FIRE	FM-2786-CA	2008	
OR	ROYCE BUTTE FIRE	FM-2787-OR	2008	
CA	ESPERANZA FIRE	FM-2678-CA	2007	
NV	PINEHAVEN FIRE	FM-2679-NV	2007	
TX	RIM ROCK FIRE	FM-2680-TX	2007	
CA	SHEKELL FIRE	FM-2681-CA	2007	
NM	BELEN FIRE	FM-2682-NM	2007	
CA	241 FIRE	FM-2683-CA	2007	
FL	53 BIG PINE FIRE	FM-2684-FL	2007	
GA	SWEAT FARM ROAD FIRE	FM-2685-GA	2007	
GA	KNEEKNOCKER SWAMP FIRE	FM-2686-GA	2007	
FL	DELAND FIRE COMPLEX	FM-2687-FL	2007	
GA	ROUNDABOUT FIRE	FM-2688-GA	2007	
FL	SUWANNEE FIRE COMPLEX	FM-2689-FL	2007	
FL	BLACK CREEK FIRE	FM-2690-FL	2007	
CA	GRIFFITH PARK FIRE	FM-2691-CA	2007	
FL	CALLOOSAHATCHEE FIRE COMPLEX	FM-2692-FL	2007	
GA	BUGABOO SCRUB FIRE	FM-2693-GA	2007	
CA	ISLAND FIRE	FM-2694-CA	2007	
NJ	WARREN GROVE FIRE	FM-2695-NJ	2007	
FL	OKEECHOBEE FIRE COMPLEX	FM-2696-FL	2007	
GA	HARVEYTOWN FIRE	FM-2697-GA	2007	
CO	NEWCASTLE FIRE	FM-2698-CO	2007	
AK	CARIBOU HILLS FIRE	FM-2699-AK	2007	
CA	ANGORA FIRE	FM-2700-CA	2007	
HI	OLOWALU FIRE	FM-2701-HI	2007	
CA	CREEK FIRE	FM-2702-CA	2007	
UT	NEOLA NORTH FIRE	FM-2703-UT	2007	
NV	RED ROCK FIRE	FM-2704-NV	2007	
NV	SLEEPING ELEPHANT FIRE	FM-2705-NV	2007	
CA	INYO FIRE COMPLEX	FM-2706-CA	2007	
UT	MILFORD FLAT FIRE	FM-2707-UT	2007	
CA	CANYON FIRE	FM-2708-CA	2007	
NV	HUNGRY VALLEY FIRE	FM-2709-NV	2007	
SD	ALABAUGH CANYON FIRE	FM-2710-SD	2007	
WA	EASY STREET FIRE	FM-2711-WA	2007	
OR	EGLEY FIRE COMPLEX	FM-2712-OR	2007	
NV	HAWKEN FIRE	FM-2713-NV	2007	
WA	TUNK GRADE FIRE	FM-2714-WA	2007	
UT	SALT CREEK FIRE	FM-2715-UT	2007	
SD	BOX ELDER FIRE	FM-2716-SD	2007	
NV	MURPHY FIRE COMPLEX	FM-2717-NV	2007	
MT	JOCKO LAKES FIRE	FM-2718-MT	2007	
WY	LITTLE GOOSE FIRE	FM-2719-WY	2007	
HI	WAIALUA FIRE	FM-2720-HI	2007	
MT	BLACK CAT FIRE	FM-2721-MT	2007	
HI	KOHALA MOUNTAIN ROAD FIRE	FM-2722-HI	2007	
MT	FORD ROAD FIRE	FM-2723-MT	2007	
ID	CASTLE ROCK FIRE	FM-2724-ID	2007	
ID	EAST ZONE FIRE COMPLEX	FM-2725-ID	2007	
ID	CASCADE FIRE COMPLEX	FM-2726-ID	2007	
OR	GW FIRE	FM-2727-OR	2007	
CA	BUTLER 2 FIRE	FM-2728-CA	2007	
CA	ANGEL FIRE	FM-2729-CA	2007	
MT	COUNTRY CLUB FIRE	FM-2730-MT	2007	
WA	BROUGHTON FIRE	FM-2731-WA	2007	
CA	WOODHOUSE FIRE	FM-2584-CA	2006	
CA	BORDER # 50 FIRE	FM-2585-CA	2006	
CA	SCHOOL FIRE	FM-2586-CA	2006	
OK	FLAT ROCK FIRE COMPLEX	FM-2587-OK	2006	
OK	VELMA FIRE COMPLEX	FM-2588-OK	2006	
OK	ANTIOCH FIRE	FM-2589-OK	2006	
OK	TEXANNA ROAD FIRE	FM-2590-OK	2006	
TX	CALLAHAN COUNTY FIRE	FM-2591-TX	2006	
OK	HUGHES COUNTY FIRE COMPLEX	FM-2592-OK	2006	
TX	KENNEDALE FIRE	FM-2593-TX	2006	
OK	ACHILLE FIRE COMPLEX	FM-2594-OK	2006	
OK	EASTERN OKLAHOMA COUNTY FIRE COMPLEX	FM-2595-OK	2006	
TX	CARBON FIRE	FM-2596-TX	2006	
OK	DEPEW FIRE COMPLEX	FM-2597-OK	2006	
TX	RINGGOLD FIRE	FM-2598-TX	2006	
OK	WAINWRIGHT FIRE COMPLEX	FM-2599-OK	2006	
NM	SOUTHEAST NEW MEXICO FIRE COMPLEX	FM-2600-NM	2006	
OK	SHAMROCK FIRE COMPLEX	FM-2601-OK	2006	
OK	BETHEL ACRES FIRE	FM-2602-OK	2006	
OK	CASHION FIRE COMPLEX	FM-2603-OK	2006	
OK	GUTHRIE FIRE	FM-2604-OK	2006	
OK	SAPULPA FIRE COMPLEX	FM-2605-OK	2006	
OK	PRAGUE FIRE	FM-2606-OK	2006	
OK	63RD STREET FIRE	FM-2607-OK	2006	
OK	EUFAULA FIRE	FM-2608-OK	2006	
TX	BULVERDE FIRE	FM-2609-TX	2006	
TX	ROSEWOOD FIRE	FM-2610-TX	2006	
TX	MILL CREEK FIRE	FM-2611-TX	2006	
TX	CEDAR CREEK FIRE	FM-2612-TX	2006	
CO	MAURICIO CANYON FIRE	FM-2613-CO	2006	
TX	HAWKINS FIRE	FM-2614-TX	2006	
OK	MCNALLY FLATS FIRE	FM-2615-OK	2006	
OK	HENRYETTA FIRE	FM-2616-OK	2006	
TX	NIEDERWALD FIRE	FM-2617-TX	2006	
OK	RATCLIFF FIRE	FM-2618-OK	2006	
TX	LOCKHART FIRE	FM-2619-TX	2006	
TX	CADDO FIRE	FM-2620-TX	2006	
TX	HUNTINGTON BROOK FIRE	FM-2621-TX	2006	
TX	ORCHARD FIRE	FM-2622-TX	2006	
OK	NORTH STILLWATER FIRE	FM-2623-OK	2006	
OK	STECKER FIRE	FM-2624-OK	2006	
OK	KIEFER FIRE	FM-2625-OK	2006	
OK	RYAN FIRE	FM-2626-OK	2006	
OK	PAOLI FIRE	FM-2627-OK	2006	
OK	SPERRY FIRE	FM-2628-OK	2006	
TX	VENUS FIRE COMPLEX	FM-2629-TX	2006	
CA	SIERRA FIRE	FM-2630-CA	2006	
NM	CASA FIRE	FM-2631-NM	2006	
KS	OBEE FIRE	FM-2632-KS	2006	
OK	PONCA CITY FIRE	FM-2633-OK	2006	
OK	CEMENT FIRE	FM-2634-OK	2006	
OK	NEW CASTLE FIRE	FM-2635-OK	2006	
NM	OJO FELIZ FIRE	FM-2636-NM	2006	
VA	BULL MOUNTAIN FIRE	FM-2637-VA	2006	
FL	VOLUSIA FIRE COMPLEX	FM-2638-FL	2006	
TX	LAKE OLYMPIA FIRE	FM-2639-TX	2006	
AZ	LA BARRANCA FIRE	FM-2640-AZ	2006	
AK	PARKS HIGHWAY (TAMARACK) FIRE	FM-2641-AK	2006	
AZ	POTATO FIRE	FM-2642-AZ	2006	
AZ	WOODY FIRE	FM-2643-AZ	2006	
NM	MALPAIS FIRE	FM-2644-NM	2006	
AZ	BRINS FIRE	FM-2645-AZ	2006	
CO	MALO VEGA FIRE	FM-2646-CO	2006	
NM	RIVERA MESA FIRE	FM-2647-NM	2006	
NV	SUZIE FIRE	FM-2648-NV	2006	
NV	OREGON FIRE	FM-2649-NV	2006	
NV	LINEHAN FIRE COMPLEX	FM-2650-NV	2006	
TX	NORTH TRINITY FIRE	FM-2651-TX	2006	
MT	SAUNDERS FIRE	FM-2652-MT	2006	
CA	SAWTOOTH FIRE COMPLEX	FM-2653-CA	2006	
WY	THORN DIVIDE FIRE COMPLEX	FM-2654-WY	2006	
NE	BIG ROCK FIRE	FM-2655-NE	2006	
CA	HORSE FIRE	FM-2656-CA	2006	
OR	FOSTER GULCH FIRE COMPLEX	FM-2657-OR	2006	
SD	EAST RIDGE FIRE	FM-2658-SD	2006	
OR	BLACK CRATER FIRE	FM-2659-OR	2006	
NE	DAWES COUNTY FIRE COMPLEX	FM-2660-NE	2006	
NE	SIOUX COUNTY FIRE COMPLEX	FM-2661-NE	2006	
CA	JUNCTION FIRE	FM-2662-CA	2006	
WA	VALLEY MILL FIRE	FM-2663-WA	2006	
NV	VERDI FIRE	FM-2664-NV	2006	
WY	JACKSON CANYON FIRE	FM-2665-WY	2006	
TX	PURGATORY ROAD FIRE	FM-2666-TX	2006	
TX	CADDO II FIRE COMPLEX	FM-2667-TX	2006	
WA	COLUMBIA FIRE COMPLEX	FM-2668-WA	2006	
MT	EMERALD HILLS FIRE	FM-2669-MT	2006	
NV	MUDD FIRE	FM-2670-NV	2006	
MT	DERBY FIRE	FM-2671-MT	2006	
CO	RED APPLE FIRE	FM-2672-CO	2006	
HI	MA'ALAEA FIRE	FM-2673-HI	2006	
WA	FLICK CREEK FIRE	FM-2674-WA	2006	
TX	MOORE ROAD FIRE	FM-2675-TX	2006	
CA	ORCHARD FIRE	FM-2676-CA	2006	
CA	DAY FIRE	FM-2677-CA	2006	
SD	SD WILDFIRE CAMP FIVE	FM-2557-SD	2005	
AZ	VEKOL FIRE-05-26-2005	FM-2558-AZ	2005	
AZ	AZ-BOBBY FIRE-06-08-2005	FM-2559-AZ	2005	
AZ	AZ-HULET FIRE-06-11-2005	FM-2560-AZ	2005	
AZ	CAVE CREEK FIRE COMPLEX	FM-2561-AZ	2005	
AZ	AZ-HUMBUG FIRE 06-23–2005	FM-2562-AZ	2005	
NV	GOOD SPRINGS FIRE	FM-2563-NV	2005	
UT	BLUE SPRINGS FIRE	FM-2564-UT	2005	
SD	SD RICCO FIRE	FM-2565-SD	2005	
CO	MASON FIRE	FM-2566-CO	2005	
NV	CONTACT FIRE	FM-2567-NV	2005	
NV	CARLIN FIRE	FM-2568-NV	2005	
SD	SD SKYLINE #2 FIRE 7/16/05	FM-2569-SD	2005	
AZ	AZ-WILDFIRE (EDGE COMPLEX) 07-22-2005	FM-2570-AZ	2005	
CA	CA-QUARTZ FIRE-7-25-2005	FM-2571-CA	2005	
WA	DIRTY FACE FIRE	FM-2572-WA	2005	
HI	LALAMILO FIRE	FM-2573-HI	2005	
HI	AKONI PULE HIGHWAY FIRE	FM-2574-HI	2005	
WA	SCHOOL FIRE	FM-2575-WA	2005	
HI	NANAKULI BRUSH FIRE	FM-2576-HI	2005	
HI	WAIKELE FIRE	FM-2577-HI	2005	
NV	VOR-MCCARTY FIRE	FM-2578-NV	2005	
OR	DEER CREEK FIRE	FM-2579-OR	2005	
CA	MANTON FIRE	FM-2580-CA	2005	
NV	CHANCE FIRE	FM-2581-NV	2005	
CA	SUNDEVIL FIRE	FM-2582-CA	2005	
CA	TOPANGA FIRE	FM-2583-CA	2005	

=== 1970 - 2005 ===
State	Name	FEMA disaster code	Year declared	Notes
CA	PASS FIRE	FM-2500-CA	2004	
CA	CA-GRAND PRIX FIRE-10-23-2003	FM-2501-CA	2004	
CA	CA-VERDALE FIRE 10-25-2003	FM-2502-CA	2004	
CA	OLD FIRE	FM-2503-CA	2004	
CA	SIMI FIRE	FM-2504-CA	2004	
CA	CA-CEDAR FIRE-10-26-2003	FM-2505-CA	2004	
CA	PARADISE FIRE	FM-2506-CA	2004	
CA	CA-MOUNTAIN FIRE-10-26-2003	FM-2507-CA	2004	
CA	CA-WHITMORE FIRE-10-28-2003	FM-2508-CA	2004	
CO	CO - OVERLAND WILDFIRE - 10/29/2003	FM-2509-CO	2004	
CO	CO - CHEROKEE RANCH WILDFIRE - 10/29/2003	FM-2510-CO	2004	
CO	CO - BUCKHORN CREEK FIRE - 11/11/2003	FM-2511-CO	2004	
WY	WY - TONGUE RIVER WILDFIRE - 11/19/2003	FM-2512-WY	2004	
SD	SD - MILL ROAD WILDFIRE - 11/19/2003	FM-2513-SD	2004	
CO	CO - PICNIC ROCK FIRE - 03/30/2004	FM-2514-CO	2004	
CA	CA - PLEASURE FIRE - 04-25-2004	FM-2515-CA	2004	
CA	CA-EAGLE FIRE-05-04-2004	FM-2516-CA	2004	
CA	CA-CERRITOS FIRE-5-04-2004	FM-2517-CA	2004	
NM	PEPPIN FIRE	FM-2518-NM	2004	
CA	CA-GAVIOTA FIRE-06-05-2004	FM-2519-CA	2004	
AZ	THREE FORKS FIRE	FM-2520-AZ	2004	
UT	BROOKSIDE FIRE	FM-2521-UT	2004	
NM	NM-BERNARDO FIRE-6-18-2004	FM-2522-NM	2004	
AZ	WILLOW FIRE	FM-2523-AZ	2004	
NV	VERDI FIRE COMPLEX	FM-2524-NV	2004	
AK	BOUNDARY FIRE	FM-2525-AK	2004	
CO	CO-MCGRUDER FIRE-07/03/2004	FM-2526-CO	2004	
WA	WA-BEEBE FIRE-07-04-2004	FM-2527-WA	2004	
CA	CA - PINE FIRE - 7-13-2004	FM-2528-CA	2004	
CA	CA - MATAGUAY FIRE - 7-13-2004	FM-2529-CA	2004	
CA	CA-LAKEVIEW-07-14-2004	FM-2530-CA	2004	
NV	WATERFALL FIRE	FM-2531-NV	2004	
CA	CA-HOLLOW FIRE-07-14-2004	FM-2532-CA	2004	
CA	CA-MELTON WILDFIRE-07-18-2004	FM-2533-CA	2004	
CA	CA-FOOTHILL WILDFIRE-07-18-2004	FM-2534-CA	2004	
CA	CA-CROWN WILDFIRE-07-21-2004	FM-2535-CA	2004	
NV	ROBBERS FIRE	FM-2536-NV	2004	
WA	DEEP HARBOR FIRE	FM-2537-WA	2004	
WA	ELK HEIGHTS FIRE	FM-2538-WA	2004	
OR	OR-REDWOOD HIGHWAY WILDFIRE-08-04-2004	FM-2539-OR	2004	
CA	CA-CALAVERAS COMPLEX-08-07-2004	FM-2540-CA	2004	
CA	CA-STEVENS FIRE-08–8-2004	FM-2541-CA	2004	
AK	AK-BOLGEN CREEK FIRE-08-10-2004	FM-2542-AK	2004	
WA	WA-FISCHER WILDFIRE-08-11-2004	FM-2543-WA	2004	
CA	CA-BEAR FIRE-08-11-2004	FM-2544-CA	2004	
CA	CA OREGON FIRE 08-11-2004	FM-2545-CA	2004	
WA	MUD LAKE FIRE	FM-2546-WA	2004	
CA	CA-FRENCH FIRE 08-14-2004	FM-2547-CA	2004	
CA	CA-LAKE FIRE 08-14-2004	FM-2548-CA	2004	
OR	OR-BLAND MOUNTAIN WILDFIRE-08-20-2004	FM-2549-OR	2004	
NV	ANDREW WILDFIRE	FM-2550-NV	2004	
AK	AK-TAYLOR COMPLEX FIRE-09-01-2004	FM-2551-AK	2004	
CA	CA-BEAR FIRE-09-02-2004	FM-2552-CA	2004	
CA	CA-PATTISON FIRE-09-03-2004	FM-2553-CA	2004	
CA	CA-GEYSERS FIRE-09-04-2004	FM-2554-CA	2004	
CA	RIX-CA-OLD HIGHWAY WILDFIRE 9/13/04	FM-2555-CA	2004	
HI	KAWAIHAE ROAD FIRE HAWAII	FM-2556-HI	2004	
CA	CA - WILDFIRE (PACIFIC FIRE) - 01-06-2003	FM-2466-CA	2003	
NM	NM-WALKER FIRE-05-09-03	FM-2467-NM	2003	
HI	HI - WAIKOLOA VILLAGE FIRE - 05/18/2003	FM-2468-HI	2003	
NV	NV - HIGHWAY-50 FIRE - 06/17/2003	FM-2469-NV	2003	
AZ	ASPEN FIRE	FM-2470-AZ	2003	
AZ	ASH FIRE	FM-2471-AZ	2003	
NM	NM-BOSQUE FIRE-06-25-2003	FM-2472-NM	2003	
CA	CA - SAWMILL FIRE - 06-27-2003	FM-2473-CA	2003	
CA	CA - TEJON FIRE - 06-30-2003	FM-2474-CA	2003	
CA	CA-RAILROAD FIRE-07-03-2003	FM-2475-CA	2003	
NV	NV-RED ROCK FIRE 7-11-03	FM-2476-NV	2003	
WA	WA-MIDDLE FORK FIRE-07-12-2003	FM-2477-WA	2003	
AZ	KINISHBA FIRE	FM-2478-AZ	2003	
NV	NV-ROBB WILDFIRE-7-14-2003	FM-2479-NV	2003	
UT	UT-CAUSEY FIRE 07/14/2003	FM-2480-UT	2003	
WA	WA-OKANOGAN CITY FIRE-07-16-2003	FM-2481-WA	2003	
OK	OK - BIG ROCK FIRE - 07/18/03	FM-2482-OK	2003	
MT	MT - MISSOURI BREAKS COMPLEX FIRE 07/16/03	FM-2483-MT	2003	
MT	MT-ROBERT FIRE-07-23-03	FM-2484-MT	2003	
MT	MT-WEDGE CANYON FIRE-07/18/2003	FM-2485-MT	2003	
CO	CO-CLOUDY PASS FIRE-07/25/2003	FM-2486-CO	2003	
CA	CANYON FIRE	FM-2487-CA	2003	
MT	MT-HOBBLE FIRE-08/07/2003	FM-2488-MT	2003	
MT	MT-CHERRY CREEK FIRE -08/06/03	FM-2489-MT	2003	
MT	MT-MISSOULA/MINERAL FIRE ZONE-08/08/03	FM-2490-MT	2003	
CA	CA-LOCUST WILDFIRE-08-19-2003	FM-2491-CA	2003	
MT	MT-LINCOLN FIRE COMPLEX - 08/14/2003	FM-2492-MT	2003	
OR	OR-BOOTH FIRE-8-19-2003	FM-2493-OR	2003	
MT	MT-FLATHEAD FIRE ZONE-8/20/03	FM-2494-MT	2003	
OR	OR-WYETH/HERMAN CREEK FIRE 09-02-2003	FM-2495-OR	2003	
OR	OR-COVE ROAD FIRE-09-05-2003	FM-2496-OR	2003	
CA	CA-BRIDGE FIRE-09-05-2003	FM-2497-CA	2003	
WA	WA-NEEDLE FIRE-09-06-2003	FM-2498-WA	2003	
NV	NV - VOLTAIRE-2 FIRE - 09-29-2003	FM-2499-NV	2003	
CO	CO - ARMAGEDDON FIRE - 11/01/01	FM-2383-CO	2002	
KY	KY - KENTUCKY RIVER COMPLEX - 11/02/01	FM-2384-KY	2002	
KY	KY - SOUTHEASTERN FIRE COMPLEX - 11/02/01	FM-2385-KY	2002	
KY	KY - EASTERN FIRE COMPLEX - 11/02/2001	FM-2386-KY	2002	
TN	TN - CHATTANOOGA FIRE COMPLEX - 11/03/01	FM-2387-TN	2002	
SC	SC - LONG BAY FIRE - 11/09/2001	FM-2388-SC	2002	
TN	TN - RIDGE CREST FIRE - 11/14/2001	FM-2389-TN	2002	
VA	VA - FAR SOUTHWEST FIRE COMPLEX - 11/16/2001	FM-2390-VA	2002	
WV	WV - SOUTHEAST FIRE COMPLEX - 11/16/2001	FM-2391-WV	2002	
WV	WV - TROUGH AND SMOKE HOLE FIRE COMPLEX - 11/16/2001	FM-2392-WV	2002	
VA	VA - SHENANDOAH GAP FIRE COMPLEX - 11/20/01	FM-2393-VA	2002	
VA	VA - HEARD MOUNTAIN FIRE COMPLEX - 11/20/2001	FM-2394-VA	2002	
AL	AL - NORTH EAST ALABAMA FIRE COMPLEX - 11/20/2001	FM-2395-AL	2002	
CA	GAVILAN FIRE	FM-2396-CA	2002	
VA	VA - FULTZ RUN FIRE - 02-28-2002	FM-2397-VA	2002	
NM	NM-KOKOPELLI FIRE COMPLEX-3-23-02	FM-2398-NM	2002	
CO	CO - SNAKING FIRE - 4/23/2002	FM-2399-CO	2002	
AZ	AZ-RYAN-WILDFIRE-4/30/2002	FM-2400-AZ	2002	
CO	CUERNO VERDE FIRE	FM-2401-CO	2002	
NM	NM - PENASCO FIRE - 05-01-02	FM-2402-NM	2002	
CO	BLACK MOUNTAIN FIRE	FM-2403-CO	2002	
NM	NM - DALTON FIRE - 05/06/02	FM-2404-NM	2002	
CA	ANTONIO FIRE	FM-2405-CA	2002	
AZ	AZ - INDIAN FIRE - 5/15/2002	FM-2406-AZ	2002	
CO	CO - SCHOONOVER FIRE - 05/23/02	FM-2407-CO	2002	
NM	NM - BORREGO FIRE - 5-23-02	FM-2408-NM	2002	
MN	MN - BY-PASS FIRE - 05/31/2002	FM-2409-MN	2002	
CO	IRON MOUNTAIN FIRE	FM-2410-CO	2002	
NJ	NJ - DOUBLE TROUBLE WILDFIRE - 6/02/02	FM-2411-NJ	2002	
CO	CO - SPRING FIRE - 06/03/02	FM-2412-CO	2002	
CO	CO - JAMES JOHN / FISHER - 06/03/02	FM-2413-CO	2002	
NM	NM-TURKEY FIRE-6-2-02	FM-2414-NM	2002	
NM	NM-CERRO PELADO-6-2-02	FM-2415-NM	2002	
NM	NM-PONIL FIRE-06/02/02	FM-2416-NM	2002	
CA	CA - COPPER FIRE - 06-06-2002	FM-2417-CA	2002	
CO	UTE PASS FIRE	FM-2418-CO	2002	
CO	COAL SEAM FIRE	FM-2419-CO	2002	
NV	NV WILDFIRE (PIOCHE) 06-08-2002	FM-2420-NV	2002	
CO	CO - HAYMEN FIRE - 06/09/02	FM-2421-CO	2002	
CO	CO - DIERICH FIRE - 06/10/02	FM-2422-CO	2002	
CO	MISSIONARY RIDGE FIRE	FM-2423-CO	2002	
NM	NM - ROYBAL FIRE - 06/13/02	FM-2424-NM	2002	
CA	BLUECUT FIRE	FM-2425-CA	2002	
SC	SC-LEGENDS FIRE	FM-2426-SC	2002	
WY	WY-HENSEL FIRE-06/07/02	FM-2427-WY	2002	
CO	MILLION FIRE	FM-2428-CO	2002	
AZ	RODEO FIRE	FM-2429-AZ	2002	
AZ	AZ - CHEDISKI FARMS FIRE - 06/21/2002	FM-2430-AZ	2002	
CO	CO-WILEY RIDGE FIRE-06/23/02	FM-2431-CO	2002	
CO	VALLEY FIRE	FM-2432-CO	2002	
CA	LOUISIANA FIRE	FM-2433-CA	2002	
SD	GRIZZLY GULCH FIRE	FM-2434-SD	2002	
ND	ND - AGAIN FIRE - 06/29/2002	FM-2435-ND	2002	
WY	WY - REESE MOUNTAIN FIRE - 07/01/02	FM-2436-WY	2002	
UT	UT - MUSTANG FIRE - 07/01/2002	FM-2437-UT	2002	
NV	NV - GONDOLA FIRE - 07/03/2002	FM-2438-NV	2002	
AZ	AZ - ORACLE HILLS FIRE - 07/14/2002	FM-2439-AZ	2002	
NV	NV - GATE FIRE COMPLEX - 07/15/02	FM-2441-NV	2002	
CO	CO - BURN CANYON FIRE - 07/15/02	FM-2442-CO	2002	
OR	OR - EYERLY FIRE - 07/13/2002	FM-2443-OR	2002	
OR	OR - WINTER FIRE - 07/15/2002	FM-2444-OR	2002	
OR	OR - SQUIRE PEAK/WALL CREEK FIRE - 07/17/02	FM-2445-OR	2002	
NV	NV - LOST CABIN FIRE - 07/17/02	FM-2446-NV	2002	
CO	BIG ELK FIRE	FM-2447-CO	2002	
OR	OR - FLAGTAIL FIRE - 07/19/02	FM-2448-OR	2002	
WA	WA - DEER POINT FIRE - 07/20/02	FM-2449-WA	2002	
CA	DEER FIRE	FM-2450-CA	2002	
WA	WA - PICKENS FIRE - 07/24/02	FM-2451-WA	2002	
OR	OR - SHELDON RIDGE FIRE - 07/25/02	FM-2452-OR	2002	
OR	OR - BISCUIT FIRE - 07/28/02	FM-2453-OR	2002	
OR	TIMBERED ROCK FIRE	FM-2454-OR	2002	
OR	OR - CACHE MOUNTAIN FIRE - 07/28/02	FM-2455-OR	2002	
CA	CA - PINES FIRE - 07/30/02	FM-2456-CA	2002	
CO	CO - PANORAMA FIRE - 07/31/02	FM-2457-CO	2002	
SD	SD - BATTLE CREEK FIRE - 08/18/02	FM-2458-SD	2002	
NM	NM - LAKES FIRE COMPLEX - 08/26/02	FM-2459-NM	2002	
WY	WY - COMMISSARY RIDGE FIRE - 08/31/02	FM-2460-WY	2002	
CA	SQUIRREL FIRE	FM-2461-CA	2002	
CA	LEONA FIRE	FM-2462-CA	2002	
CA	SIERRA FIRE	FM-2463-CA	2002	
CA	WILLIAMS FIRE	FM-2464-CA	2002	
CA	CROY FIRE	FM-2465-CA	2002	
TX	TX - QUAIL RUN FIRE - 10/03/00	FM-2344-TX	2001	
MN	MN - CARLOS EDGE FIRE COMPLEX - 10/19/2000	FM-2345-MN	2001	
TN	TN - KNOXVILLE FIRE COMPLEX - 11/02/00	FM-2346-TN	2001	
TN	TN - COOKEVILLE FIRE COMPLEX - 11/03/00	FM-2347-TN	2001	
TN	TN-GREENEVILLE FIRE COMPLEX-11/03/00	FM-2348-TN	2001	
KY	KY - SOUTHEASTERN DISTRICT FIRE COMPLEX - 11/03/00	FM-2349-KY	2001	
KY	KY - EASTERN DISTRICT FIRE COMPLEX - 11/03/00	FM-2350-KY	2001	
TX	TX - ALSBURY FIRE - 08/29/00	FM-2351-TX	2001	
TX	TX - AMHURST STREET FIRE - 09/04/00	FM-2352-TX	2001	
FL	FL - LAKELAND COMPLEX FIRE	FM-2353-FL	2001	
FL	FL - OKEECHOBEE COMPLEX FIRE	FM-2354-FL	2001	
FL	FL - CALOOSAHATCHEE FIRE COMPLEX	FM-2355-FL	2001	
FL	FL - ORLANDO COMPLEX FIRE	FM-2357-FL	2001	
FL	FL - MYAKKA COMPLEX FIRE	FM-2358-FL	2001	
FL	FL - EVERGLADES FIRE COMPLEX - 04/25/01	FM-2359-FL	2001	
FL	FL - CHIPOLA RIVER FIRE COMPLEX - 05/15/01	FM-2360-FL	2001	
FL	FL - ESCAMBIA FIRE COMPLEX - 05/16/01	FM-2361-FL	2001	
GA	GA - BLOUNTS PASTURE FIRE	FM-2362-GA	2001	
FL	PERRY FIRE COMPLEX	FM-2363-FL	2001	
NM	NM -TRAP AND SKEET FIRE - 06/02/2001	FM-2364-NM	2001	
AK	AK - RED FOX FIRE - 06/30/01	FM-2365-AK	2001	
NV	NV - TEN MILE FIRE - 07/05/2001	FM-2366-NV	2001	
WY	WY WILDFIRE -GREEN KNOLL- JULY 23, 2001	FM-2367-WY	2001	
WA	WA - UNION VALLEY FIRE - 07/28/01	FM-2368-WA	2001	
SD	SD - ELK MOUNTAIN FIRE COMPLEX - 08/01/01	FM-2369-SD	2001	
WY	WY- ELK MOUNTAIN FIRE COMPLEX - 08/01/01	FM-2370-WY	2001	
NV	NV - ANTELOPE FIRE - 08/09/2001	FM-2371-NV	2001	
WA	WA - VIRGINIA LAKES COMPLEX - 2372	FM-2372-WA	2001	
WA	WA BREWSTER FIRE COMPLEX 2373	FM-2373-WA	2001	
WA	WA - ICICLE FIRE COMPLEX - 2374	FM-2374-WA	2001	
OR	OR BRIDGE CREEK FIRES 2375	FM-2375-OR	2001	
WA	WA TONASKET FIRE COMPLEX 2376	FM-2376-WA	2001	
WA	WA SPRUCE DOME FIRE COMPLEX 2377	FM-2377-WA	2001	
WA	WA - MT LEONA FIRE COMPLEX - 2378	FM-2378-WA	2001	
WA	WA - REX CREEK FIRE COMPLEX - 2379	FM-2379-WA	2001	
OR	OR MONUMENT COMPLEX 2380	FM-2380-OR	2001	
UT	UT - MOLLIE FIRE - 08/19/01	FM-2381-UT	2001	
WY	WY - MCFARLAND DIVIDE FIRE - 09/06/01	FM-2382-WY	2001	
TX	BLUESTEM FIRE	FM-2286-TX	2000	
TX	JORDAN CREEK FIRE	FM-2287-TX	2000	
KY	KY, WILDFIRES #001	FM-2288-KY	2000	
TX	SADDLEBACK FIRE	FM-2289-TX	2000	
TX	PURGATORY FIRE	FM-2290-TX	2000	
TX	BOB'S TRAIL FIRE	FM-2291-TX	2000	
MO	CAMDEN FIRE COMPLEX	FM-2292-MO	2000	
HI	HAWAII COUNTY FIRE COMPLEX	FM-2293-HI	2000	
FL	FL - MERRITT FIRE	FM-2294-FL	2000	
NM	RIO GRANDE FIRE COMPLEX	FM-2295-NM	2000	
NM	CREE FIRE	FM-2296-NM	2000	
NM	SCOTT ABLE FIRE	FM-2297-NM	2000	
FL	FLOWERS-MYAKKA FIRE COMPLEX	FM-2298-FL	2000	
FL	WITHLACOOCHEE FIRE COMPLEX	FM-2299-FL	2000	
FL	LAKELAND DISTRICT FIRE	FM-2300-FL	2000	
FL	FL, ORLANDO DISTRICT FIRE COMPLEX	FM-2301-FL	2000	
FL	FL, BUNNELL FIRE COMPLEX	FM-2302-FL	2000	
FL	FL, WACCASASSA FIRE COMPLEX	FM-2303-FL	2000	
NM	VIVEACH FIRE	FM-2304-NM	2000	
FL	FL, JACKSONVILLE FIRE COMPLEX	FM-2305-FL	2000	
FL	FL, SUWANNEE FIRE COMPLEX	FM-2306-FL	2000	
FL	FL, PERRY FIRE COMPLEX	FM-2307-FL	2000	
CO	BOBCAT GULCH FIRE	FM-2308-CO	2000	
CO	HIGH MEADOWS FIRE	FM-2309-CO	2000	
NM	NM-LA CUEVA FIRE	FM-2310-NM	2000	
WA	TWO FORK FIRE	FM-2311-WA	2000	
NV	RENO FIRE COMPLEX	FM-2312-NV	2000	
WA	WA-WILDFIRE-07-24-2000	FM-2313-WA	2000	
MT	MT - CENTRAL ZONE 3B FIRE COMPLEX	FM-2314-MT	2000	
WY	WY - DEAD HORSE FIRE	FM-2315-WY	2000	
NV	NV - ARROWCREEK FIRE	FM-2316-NV	2000	
MT	MT-SOUTHWESTERN ZONE TWO FIRE COMPLEX	FM-2317-MT	2000	
MT	MT - CENTRAL ZONE 3C FIRE COMPLEX	FM-2318-MT	2000	
SD	FLAGPOLE FIRE COMPLEX	FM-2319-SD	2000	
MT	MT - NORTHWESTERN ZONE 1 FIRE COMPLEX	FM-2320-MT	2000	
MT	MT - SOUTH CENTRAL ZONE 4 FIRE COMPLEX	FM-2321-MT	2000	
TX	TX-CHICKEN FIRE-0823-00	FM-2322-TX	2000	
WA	WA - MULE DRY FIRE - 2000	FM-2323-WA	2000	
SD	SD JASPER FIRE IR #3	FM-2324-SD	2000	
TX	TX - LIVE OAK LOOP FIRE	FM-2325-TX	2000	
MT	MT - WILLIE FIRE	FM-2326-MT	2000	
TX	TX - RANGER HILL FIRE - 8/30/00	FM-2327-TX	2000	
TX	TX - MOORE BRANCH FIRE - 09/03/00	FM-2328-TX	2000	
TX	TX - STANLEY MAINLINE FIRE - 09/04/00	FM-2329-TX	2000	
TX	TX - SHEPPARD REESE FIRE - 09/04/00	FM-2330-TX	2000	
TX	TX - PEACH CREEK FIRE - 09/04/00	FM-2331-TX	2000	
TX	TX - WARREN CHAPEL FIRE - 09/04/00	FM-2332-TX	2000	
TX	TX - MESQUITE CREEK FIRE - 09/08/00	FM-2333-TX	2000	
TX	TX - FROST FIRE - 09/08/00	FM-2334-TX	2000	
TX	TX-DEEP CREEK FIRE-9/8/00	FM-2335-TX	2000	
TX	TX-MILAM STREET FIRE-9/9/00	FM-2336-TX	2000	
LA	LA-WESTERN LOUISIANA FIRE COMPLEX-9/8/00	FM-2337-LA	2000	
CO	CO - ELDORADO FIRE	FM-2338-CO	2000	
AL	AL - COUNTY LINE FIRE - 09/17/2000	FM-2339-AL	2000	
TX	TX-PINE COVE FIRE-9/18/00	FM-2340-TX	2000	
OK	OK-ARBUCKLE FIRE COMPLEX-9/18/00	FM-2341-OK	2000	
OK	OK-BRISTOW FIRE COMPLEX-9/18/00	FM-2342-OK	2000	
OK	OK-OAKCLIFF FIRE COMPLEX-9/21/00	FM-2343-OK	2000	
NV	NV - SPRING CREEK FIRE - 1999	FM-2356-NV	2000	
TX	FISCHER FIRE	FM-2249-TX	1999	
TN	TN - WILDFIRES 4/13/99	FM-2250-TN	1999	
FL	OKEECHOBEE FIRE COMPLEX	FM-2251-FL	1999	
FL	FL-FIRES 04/13/99	FM-2252-FL	1999	
FL	FL-FIRES 04/13/99	FM-2253-FL	1999	
FL	FL-FIRES 04/13/99	FM-2254-FL	1999	
FL	FL-FIRES 04/13/99	FM-2255-FL	1999	
FL	FL-FIRES 04/13/99	FM-2256-FL	1999	
FL	FL-FIRES 04/13/99	FM-2257-FL	1999	
FL	FL-FIRES 04/13/99	FM-2258-FL	1999	
FL	FL-FIRES 04/13/99	FM-2259-FL	1999	
FL	FL-FIRES 04/13/99	FM-2260-FL	1999	
MI	MI - TOWER LAKE MOUNTAIN FIRE - 05/06/1999	FM-2261-MI	1999	
FL	JACKSONVILLE DISTRICT FIRE	FM-2262-FL	1999	
AZ	AZ - RAINBOW FIRE - 06/11/1999	FM-2263-AZ	1999	
NV	RESERVOIR FIRE	FM-2264-NV	1999	
NV	MIRA LOMA FIRE	FM-2265-NV	1999	
MT	FISHEL CREEK FIRE COMPLEX	FM-2266-MT	1999	
NV	UNIONVILLE FIRE	FM-2267-NV	1999	
NV	OSINO FIRE	FM-2268-NV	1999	
NY	WEST POINT FIRE COMPLEX	FM-2269-NY	1999	
TX	REESE CREEK FIRE	FM-2270-TX	1999	
NV	RED ROCK FIRE	FM-2271-NV	1999	
TX	TOPEKA FIRE	FM-2272-TX	1999	
TX	MIDLOTHIAN FIRE	FM-2273-TX	1999	
TX	DALBY SPRINGS FIRE	FM-2274-TX	1999	
TX	BEAVER CREEK FIRE	FM-2275-TX	1999	
AL	AL - JACKSON FARMS FIRE - 09/18/99	FM-2276-AL	1999	
AL	AL - RUSSELLVILLE FIRE - 09/18/99	FM-2277-AL	1999	
AL	AL - CHELSEA FIRE - 09/18/99	FM-2278-AL	1999	
AL	AL - FAYETTE FIRE - 09/18/99	FM-2279-AL	1999	
AL	AL - MACINTOSH FIRE - 09/18/99	FM-2280-AL	1999	
AL	AL - LOOKOUT MOUNTAIN FIRE - 09/18/99	FM-2281-AL	1999	
TX	WILLIAMS RANCH FIRE	FM-2282-TX	1999	
AL	AL - MARTIN SCHOOL FIRE - 09/18/1999	FM-2283-AL	1999	
TX	TX-ALCOA FIRE	FM-2284-TX	1999	
TX	TX-GREENVILLE FIRE	FM-2285-TX	1999	
HI	HAWAIIAN BEACHES SUBDIVISION FIRE	FM-2195-HI	1998	
HI	LEILANI ESTATES SUBDIVISION FIRE (HAWAII CO)	FM-2196-HI	1998	
GU	GUAM TIYAN TOTO FIRE COMPLEX	FM-2197-GU	1998	
TX	CAMP WOOD HILLS FIRE	FM-2198-TX	1998	
TX	CIBOLO CREEK FIRE	FM-2199-TX	1998	
FL	PALM COAST 98 FIRE COMPLEX (ST.JOHNS, SEMINOLE & FLAGER)	FM-2200-FL	1998	
FL	JACKSONVILLE FIRE COMPLEX	FM-2201-FL	1998	
TX	PARADISE FIRE	FM-2202-TX	1998	
FL	COUNTY LINE FIRE	FM-2203-FL	1998	
FL	RACE TRACK - WALDO FIRE	FM-2204-FL	1998	
FL	WALDO SOUTHEAST FIRE	FM-2205-FL	1998	
FL	SAN PEDRO DAY FIRE	FM-2206-FL	1998	
FL	WACCASSA FIRE COMPLEX	FM-2207-FL	1998	
FL	BUNNELLE FIRE COMPLEX	FM-2208-FL	1998	
FL	SUWANEE FIRE COMPLEX	FM-2209-FL	1998	
TX	PERRY FIRE	FM-2210-TX	1998	
FL	CHIPPOLA RIVER DISTRICT-GULF COUNTY-DEPOT CREEK FIRE	FM-2211-FL	1998	
FL	CALOOSHATTCHEE FIRE COMPLEX	FM-2212-FL	1998	
NM	OSHA CANYON COMPLEX (COLFAX)	FM-2213-NM	1998	
FL	WITHLACOOTCHEE FIRE COMPLEX	FM-2214-FL	1998	
FL	ORLANDO FIRE COMPLEX	FM-2215-FL	1998	
TX	CASH JOHNSON FIRE	FM-2216-TX	1998	
TX	PARK LAKE FIRE	FM-2217-TX	1998	
TX	STERLING FIRE	FM-2218-TX	1998	
TX	MAZAMEC FIRE	FM-2219-TX	1998	
TX	CITY LAKE FIRE	FM-2220-TX	1998	
TX	ELM BRANCH FIRE	FM-2221-TX	1998	
TX	BRAZELINE FIRE	FM-2222-TX	1998	
TX	HERRON FIRE	FM-2223-TX	1998	
TX	LIVE OAK FIRE	FM-2224-TX	1998	
WA	WA - CLEVELAND FIRE - 07/28/98	FM-2225-WA	1998	
OK	BEAR MOUNTAIN FIRE COMPLEX (MC CURTAIN)	FM-2226-OK	1998	
TX	WHITE BLUFF FIRE	FM-2227-TX	1998	
TX	PINEY CREEK FIRE	FM-2228-TX	1998	
TX	ROCKY BRANCH FIRE	FM-2229-TX	1998	
TX	WEATHERFORD FIRE	FM-2230-TX	1998	
TX	CROSSROADS FIRE	FM-2231-TX	1998	
TX	HIGHWAY LAKE FIRE	FM-2232-TX	1998	
TX	UNION CHAPEL II FIRE	FM-2233-TX	1998	
TX	NORTH PACIFIC FIRE	FM-2234-TX	1998	
TX	DENSON SPRINGS FIRE	FM-2235-TX	1998	
HI	MOLOKAI FIRE 98 (MAUI)	FM-2236-HI	1998	
WA	BALL PARK FIRE (COWLITZ)	FM-2237-WA	1998	
TX	FM 362 FIRE	FM-2238-TX	1998	
TX	BLANTON FIRE	FM-2239-TX	1998	
TX	FRONTAGE FIRE	FM-2240-TX	1998	
TX	LINDALE FIRE	FM-2241-TX	1998	
TX	WOOD BRANCH VILLAGE FIRE	FM-2242-TX	1998	
OK	FRAZIER CREEK FIRE (LEFLORE)	FM-2243-OK	1998	
TX	SPEEGLEVILLE FIRE	FM-2244-TX	1998	
TX	POTOSI FIRE	FM-2245-TX	1998	
TX	MEXICO FIRE	FM-2246-TX	1998	
OK	SUGARLOAF CREEK FIRE (LEFLORE)	FM-2247-OK	1998	
WA	TUCANNON FIRE (COLUMBIA)	FM-2248-WA	1998	
WA	BENTON CITY FIRE	FM-2192-WA	1997	
WA	TUM FIRE	FM-2193-WA	1997	
WA	OLYMPIA COMMAND FIRE	FM-2194-WA	1997	
TX	NORTH TEXAS COMPLEX FIRE	FM-2117-TX	1996	
OK	STILLWATER COMPLEX FIRES	FM-2118-OK	1996	
OK	ALVA COMPLEX FIRE	FM-2119-OK	1996	
OK	SPERRY SKIATOOK BARNSDALL COMPLEX FIRES	FM-2120-OK	1996	
TX	NORTHWEST AMARILLO FIRE	FM-2121-TX	1996	
TX	BOWIE FIRE	FM-2122-TX	1996	
TX	FILLIBUSTER FIRE	FM-2123-TX	1996	
TX	CLYDE FIRE	FM-2124-TX	1996	
TX	SEVEN-ONE-SEVEN FIRE	FM-2125-TX	1996	
TX	WINDY FIRE	FM-2126-TX	1996	
TX	JUNCTION FIRE	FM-2127-TX	1996	
TX	CHOO CHOO FIRE	FM-2128-TX	1996	
TX	LAKEVIEW FIRE	FM-2129-TX	1996	
TX	PHAMTOM LAKE FIRE	FM-2130-TX	1996	
TX	LEUDERS FIRE	FM-2131-TX	1996	
TX	RINEY ROAD FIRE	FM-2132-TX	1996	
TX	COLONY CREEK FIRE	FM-2133-TX	1996	
TX	JETER ROAD FIRE	FM-2134-TX	1996	
TX	ZION VALLEY FIRE	FM-2135-TX	1996	
OK	SPERRY OWASSO COMPLEX FIRE	FM-2136-OK	1996	
TX	DUNCANVILLE FIRE	FM-2137-TX	1996	
TX	GAINESBEND FIRE	FM-2138-TX	1996	
TX	CADDO FIRE	FM-2139-TX	1996	
OK	LITTLE AXE FIRE	FM-2140-OK	1996	
TX	NAS FIRE	FM-2141-TX	1996	
TX	BUCKLE-L FIRE	FM-2142-TX	1996	
TX	CADDO II FIRE	FM-2143-TX	1996	
OK	VELMA FIRE	FM-2144-OK	1996	
TX	TRIANGLE COMPLEX FIRE	FM-2145-TX	1996	
TX	DOOUBLE MOUNTAIN FIRE	FM-2146-TX	1996	
TX	GODLEY ROAD FIRE	FM-2147-TX	1996	
TX	EXXON FIRE	FM-2148-TX	1996	
TX	CARTWRIGHT FIRE	FM-2149-TX	1996	
TX	CRUM FIRE	FM-2150-TX	1996	
TX	LIVINGTON - 7 OAKS FIRE	FM-2151-TX	1996	
TX	171 FIRE	FM-2152-TX	1996	
TX	HAMBY FIRE	FM-2153-TX	1996	
TX	GALAXY FIRE	FM-2154-TX	1996	
TX	OIL PATCH FIRE	FM-2155-TX	1996	
TX	WEST BRECKENRIDGE FIRE	FM-2156-TX	1996	
TX	IVAN FIRE	FM-2157-TX	1996	
TX	WORSHAM COMPLEX FIRE	FM-2158-TX	1996	
TX	ROUGH CREEK COMPLEX FIRE	FM-2159-TX	1996	
TX	EYED FIRE	FM-2160-TX	1996	
TX	OAK CREEK FIRE	FM-2161-TX	1996	
TX	OLD FRED FIRE	FM-2162-TX	1996	
TX	THOMAS ROAD FIRE	FM-2163-TX	1996	
TX	KNIGHT FIRE	FM-2164-TX	1996	
TX	DEVIL'S HOLLOW FIRE	FM-2165-TX	1996	
TX	OLD PROSPECT FIRE	FM-2166-TX	1996	
TX	EUREKA FIRE	FM-2167-TX	1996	
TX	DOC HOWARD FIRE	FM-2168-TX	1996	
TX	PITCHFORK FIRE	FM-2169-TX	1996	
TX	LITTLE CYPRESS FIRE	FM-2170-TX	1996	
TX	BEAVER POND FIRE	FM-2171-TX	1996	
TX	KIRBY ROAD COMPLEX FIRE	FM-2172-TX	1996	
OK	OAKHURST-SANDSPRINGS FIRE	FM-2173-OK	1996	
TX	NORTH MEMPHIS FIRE	FM-2174-TX	1996	
TX	SPORTSMAN'S WORLD COMPLEX FIRE	FM-2175-TX	1996	
AZ	LONE FIRE	FM-2176-AZ	1996	
NM	HONDO FIRE	FM-2177-NM	1996	
CO	BUFFALO CREEK FIRE	FM-2178-CO	1996	
TX	PUDUCAH FIRE	FM-2179-TX	1996	
AK	MILLERS REACH #2 FIRE	FM-2180-AK	1996	
AZ	PEAKS FIRE COMPLEX	FM-2181-AZ	1996	
AZ	COTTONWOOD FIRE	FM-2182-AZ	1996	
NV	AUTUMN HILL FIRE	FM-2183-NV	1996	
TX	LAACEY FIRE	FM-2184-TX	1996	
NV	BELLI RANCH FIRE	FM-2185-NV	1996	
WA	BOWIE FIRE (SPOKANE)	FM-2186-WA	1996	
OR	WHEELER FIRE (WHEELER)	FM-2187-OR	1996	
NV	LEE FIRE	FM-2188-NV	1996	
OR	SKELETON/EVANS WEST FIRE (DESCHUTES)	FM-2189-OR	1996	
NV	RUBY COMPLEX FIRE (ELKO)	FM-2190-NV	1996	
MT	SHEPARD MOUNTAIN FIRE (CARBON CTY)	FM-2191-MT	1996	
AZ	GERONIMO FIRE	FM-2113-AZ	1995	
AZ	RIO FIRE	FM-2114-AZ	1995	
NY	ROCKY POINT/CRANBERRY BOG FIRE	FM-2115-NY	1995	
MA	RUSSELL FIRE	FM-2116-MA	1995	
AZ	DOLAN FIRE	FM-2093-AZ	1994	
AZ	MONARCH FIRE	FM-2094-AZ	1994	
AZ	PERKINS/COYOTE FIRE COMPLEX	FM-2095-AZ	1994	
AZ	JURASSIC FIRE	FM-2096-AZ	1994	
AZ	ORACLE JUNCTION FIRE	FM-2097-AZ	1994	
CO	WAKE COMPLEX FIRE	FM-2098-CO	1994	
CO	SOUTH CANYON FIRE	FM-2099-CO	1994	
TX	MEMPHIS FIRE	FM-2100-TX	1994	
WA	RIVERSIDE WILDFIRE	FM-2101-WA	1994	
CO	ROSBOROUGH COMPLEX FIRE	FM-2102-CO	1994	
WA	TYEE WILDFIRE	FM-2103-WA	1994	
WA	HATCHERY CREEK/ROUND MOUNTAIN FIRE COMPLEX	FM-2104-WA	1994	
WA	WHITE SALMON FIRE	FM-2105-WA	1994	
NV	CRYSTAL PEAK FIRE	FM-2106-NV	1994	
UT	EDGAR FIRE	FM-2107-UT	1994	
UT	DRY CANYON II	FM-2108-UT	1994	
SD	STAGEBARN CANYON FIRE	FM-2109-SD	1994	
MT	WLDERNESS COMPLEX (LIBBY COMPLEX)	FM-2110-MT	1994	
MT	LITTLE WOLF FIRE	FM-2111-MT	1994	
OR	HULL MOUNTAIN FIRE	FM-2112-OR	1994	
AZ	DESERT FIRE	FM-2086-AZ	1993	
AZ	KINGMAN FIRE	FM-2087-AZ	1993	
AZ	RAVINE FIRE COMPLEX	FM-2088-AZ	1993	
AZ	FENCE FIRE	FM-2089-AZ	1993	
TX	NUMEROUS FIRES	FM-2090-TX	1993	
TX	DENAHOL/BARACHO FIRE	FM-2091-TX	1993	
TX	MCDANIEL FIRE	FM-2092-TX	1993	
WA	EASTERN WASHINGTON FIRES	FM-2079-WA	1992	
ME	YELLOW LINE FIRE	FM-2080-ME	1992	
OR	SAGE FLATS FIRE	FM-2081-OR	1992	
OR	ROUND LAKE FIRE	FM-2082-OR	1992	
OR	EAST EVANS CREEK FIRE	FM-2083-OR	1992	
OR	LONE PINE FIRE	FM-2084-OR	1992	
WA	SKOOKUM FIRE	FM-2085-WA	1992	
CO	OLD STAGE FIRE	FM-2077-CO	1991	
AK	APPEL MOUNTAIN FIRE	FM-2078-AK	1991	
AZ	DUDE FIRE	FM-2073-AZ	1990	
AK	TOK RIVER FIRE	FM-2074-AK	1990	
OR	AUBREY HALL FIRE	FM-2075-OR	1990	
SD	SWEDLUND FIRE	FM-2076-SD	1990	
CO	SUNNYSIDE FIRE	FM-2072-CO	1989	
OR	SHADY LANE FIRE	FM-2066-OR	1988	
TX	ALBANY FIRE	FM-2067-TX	1988	
SD	WEST BERRY TRAIL FIRE	FM-2068-SD	1988	
OR	WALKER MOUNTAIN FIRE	FM-2069-OR	1988	
WA	DINKLEMAN FIRE	FM-2070-WA	1988	
CA	FORTY NINER FIRE	FM-2071-CA	1988	
OR	BLAND MOUNTAIN FIRE	FM-2060-OR	1987	
SD	BATTLE MOUNTAIN FIRE	FM-2061-SD	1987	
OR	FROZEN CREEK FIRE	FM-2062-OR	1987	
OR	SAVAGE CREEK FIRE	FM-2063-OR	1987	
OR	SYKES CREEK FIRE	FM-2064-OR	1987	
CA	STANISLAUS COMPLEX FIRE	FM-2065-CA	1987	
NC	TOPSAIL FIRE	FM-2059-NC	1986	
FL	PERRY FIRE	FM-2050-FL	1985	
FL	ASTER FIRE	FM-2051-FL	1985	
FL	BONELL FIRE	FM-2052-FL	1985	
FL	TOMOKA FIRE	FM-2053-FL	1985	
CA	LEXINGTON FIRE	FM-2054-CA	1985	
CA	HIDDEN VALLEY LAKE FIRE	FM-2055-CA	1985	
SD	SEVEN SISTERS FIRE	FM-2056-SD	1985	
SD	FLINT HILL FIRE	FM-2057-SD	1985	
WA	TONASKET/BAKER FIRE	FM-2058-WA	1985	
OR	LA PINE/WAMPUS BUTTE FIRE	FM-2046-OR	1984	
MT	NORTH HILLS FIRE	FM-2047-MT	1984	
MT	HOUGHTON CREEK NUMBER-2	FM-2048-MT	1984	
MT	HAWKS CREEK FIRE	FM-2049-MT	1984	
HI	KILAUEA FIRE	FM-2044-HI	1983	
NV	SILVER CITY FIRE	FM-2045-NV	1983	
OR	ROUND LAKE FIRE	FM-2041-OR	1981	
NV	LITTLE VALLEY FIRE	FM-2042-NV	1981	
OR	PEAVINE PEAK	FM-2043-OR	1981	
WI	SPOONER FIRE, WASHBURN CO.	FM-2039-WI	1980	
CO	BEAR TRAP FIRE	FM-2040-CO	1980	
NV	PEA VINE PEAK FIRE	FM-2032-NV	1979	
WA	SALMON CREEK FIRE	FM-2033-WA	1979	
OR	BRIDGE CREEK FIRE	FM-2034-OR	1979	
OR	SISTERS FIRE	FM-2035-OR	1979	
OR	PINE GROVE FIRE	FM-2036-OR	1979	
MT	WEST FORK - BARKER'S CREEK FIRE	FM-2037-MT	1979	
ID	20-MILE FIRE	FM-2038-ID	1979	
OR	GRAVE CREEK FIRE	FM-2030-OR	1978	
CO	DEER CREEK CANYON FIRE	FM-2031-CO	1978	
MN	MCGREGOR FIRE	FM-2024-MN	1977	
NM	BARKER FIRE	FM-2025-NM	1977	
MT	PATTEE CANYON FIRE	FM-2026-MT	1977	
ME	BAXTER STATE FIRE	FM-2027-ME	1977	
CA	SCARFACE FIRE	FM-2028-CA	1977	
ID	WILSON CREEK FIRE	FM-2029-ID	1977	
MN	HUNTERSVILLE	FM-2018-MN	1976	
MN	TOWER	FM-2019-MN	1976	
MN	TAMARACK	FM-2020-MN	1976	
MN	TATE	FM-2021-MN	1976	
MN	LITTLE SWAN	FM-2022-MN	1976	
MN	GALVIN LINE	FM-2023-MN	1976	
SD	CUSTER STATE PARK	FM-2017-SD	1975	
NM	GUADALUIPITA FIRE	FM-2015-NM	1974	
SD	ARGLE & BOOMS CANYON	FM-2016-SD	1974	
AK	CHUGACH FIRE	FM-2006-AK	1973	
MT	PREWITT CREEK FIRE	FM-2007-MT	1973	
OR	PERRY CANYON FIRE	FM-2008-OR	1973	
MT	GOAT CREEK FIRE	FM-2009-MT	1973	
OR	ROCKY CREEK FIRE	FM-2010-OR	1973	
OR	ORINDALE DRAW FIRE	FM-2011-OR	1973	
MT	PLEASANT VALLEY FIRE (NO. 125)	FM-2012-MT	1973	
OR	DOE CREEK FIRE	FM-2013-OR	1973	
OR	HILLSVIEW FIRE	FM-2014-OR	1973	
OK	BROKEN BOW FIRE	FM-2003-OK	1971	
AK	HOG RIVER FIRE	FM-2004-AK	1971	
AK	DELTA JUNCTION FIRE	FM-2005-AK	1971	
AK	ISLAND LAKE FIRE	FM-2001-AK	1970	
WA	GRASS;AMLAND & FOREST FIRE	FM-2002-WA	1970	

== See also ==
- Federal Emergency Management Agency
- Emergency management
- History of homeland security in the United States
- Civil defense in the United States
